= 2021 Eastern Intercollegiate Volleyball Association tournament =

2021 Eastern Intercollegiate Volleyball Association Men's Volleyball Tournament
- Classification: Division I/II
- Teams: 6
- Site: Rec Hall; University Park, Pennsylvania
- Champions: Penn State (32nd title)
- Winning coach: Mark Pavlik (22nd title)
- MVP: Cal Fisher (Penn State)
- Eastern Intercollegiate Volleyball Association Men's Volleyball Tournaments

The 2021 Eastern Intercollegiate Volleyball Association Tournament was a men's volleyball tournament for the Eastern Intercollegiate Volleyball Association (EIVA) during the 2021 NCAA Division I & II men's volleyball season. It was held April 16 through April 24, 2021 at campus sites. The winner received the association's automatic bid to the 2021 NCAA volleyball tournament.

2021 Eastern Intercollegiate Volleyball Association standings
| | Conf. | | | | Overall |
| Team | W | | L | PCT | W | | L | PCT |
|---|---|---|---|---|---|---|---|---|
| No. 8 Penn State ‍†‍‡‍^{y} | 16 | – | 2 | .889 | 22 | – | 4 | .846 |
| No. 11 NJIT ‍‍‍ | 13 | – | 3 | .813 | 13 | – | 6 | .684 |
| No. 13 George Mason ‍‍‍ | 11 | – | 5 | .688 | 15 | – | 7 | .682 |
| Saint Francis ‍‍‍ | 6 | – | 12 | .333 | 8 | – | 19 | .296 |
| Charleston (WV) ‍‍‍ | 4 | – | 12 | .250 | 4 | – | 13 | .235 |
| Sacred Heart ‍‍‍ | 0 | – | 16 | .000 | 1 | – | 19 | .050 |
† – Conference champion ‡ – EIVA tournament champion y – Invited to the NCAA tournament Rankings from AVCA

== Seeds ==
With the Ivy League choosing not to participate in spring athletics, neither Harvard nor defending conference champion Princeton participated in the season. As a result EIVA changed tournament formats. All six schools participated in the tournament. Seeds 1 and 2 received byes to the semifinals, which were played at Rec Hall in University Park, Pennsylvania. The Championship also was played at Rec Hall. Seed 3 played seed 6, and seed 4 played seed 5 in the conference tournament opening round at the 3 and 4 seeds' schools.

Seedings and placement were to be determined by win percentage should teams not have played every match. Tiebreaker procedures were as follows:

- Head-to-head match record
- Head-to-head sets won against each other
- Head-to-head points amongst the tied teams
- Sets winning percentage within the conference
- Points against teams within the conference
- Coin toss by the EIVA Commissioner

| Seed | School | Conference | Tiebreaker |
|---|---|---|---|
| 1 | Penn State | 16–2 | – |
| 2 | NJIT | 13–3 | – |
| 3 | George Mason | 11–5 | – |
| 4 | St. Francis | 6–12 | – |
| 5 | Charleston | 4–12 | – |
| 6 | Sacred Heart | 0–16 | – |

== Schedule and results ==
| Time Network | Matchup | Score | Attendance | Broadcasters | Report |
Quarterfinals – Friday, April 16
| 7:00 p.m. ESPN+ | No. 3 George Mason vs. No. 6 Sacred Heart | George Mason advances due to COVID-19 protocols with Sacred Heart | – | – | Report |
Quarterfinals – Saturday, April 17
| 5:00 p.m. NEC Front Row | No. 4 St. Francis vs. No. 5 Charleston | 3–1 (24–26, 25–20, 25–17, 25–23) | 0 | Jake Slebodnick | Report |
Semifinals – Thursday, April 22
| 4:30 p.m. B1G+ | No. 2 NJIT vs. No. 3 George Mason | 0–3 (30–32, 15–25, 23–25) | 340 | David Hadar & Jon Draeger | |
| 7:30 p.m. B1G+ | No. 1 Penn State vs. No. 4 St. Francis | 3–0 (25–16, 25–22, 25–20) | 340 | David Hadar & Jon Draeger | |
Championship – Saturday, April 24
| 7:00 p.m. B1G+ | No. 1 Penn State vs. No. 3 George Mason | 3–1 (25–20, 25–20, 30–32, 25–20) | 286 | Preston Shoemaker & Logan Bourandas | |
Game times are Eastern Time. Rankings denote tournament seeding.

== Bracket ==
Quarterfinals; Friday, April 16 & Saturday, April 17
4 | St. Francis | 3
5 | Charleston | 1
3 | George Mason | WO
6 | Sacred Heart (Note: Match declared no contest due to COVID-19 protocols with Sacred Heart. George Mason advances in the tournament.)

Semifinals; Thursday, April 22
1 | Penn State | 3
4 | St. Francis | 0
2 | NJIT | 0
3 | George Mason | 3

Championship; Saturday, April 24
1 | Penn State | 3
3 | George Mason | 1
