= Sergei Gorbunov =

Sergei Gorbunov or Sergey Gorbunov may refer to:

- Sergei Gorbunov (footballer) (b. 1987), Russian footballer
- Sergey Vladimirovich Gorbunov, Soviet volleyball player who played at the 1991 Men's European Volleyball Championship
