= 2021 Penn State Nittany Lions men's volleyball team =

American college volleyball season

2021 Penn State Nittany Lions men's volleyball

EIVA Tournament Champions EIVA regular season champions

NCAA Tournament, L, Quarterfinals
- Conference: Eastern Intercollegiate Volleyball Association
- Record: 22–4 (16–2 EIVA)
- Head coach: Mark Pavlik (27th season)
- Assistant coaches: Colin McMillan (14th season); Ryan Walthall (5th season)
- Home arena: Rec Hall

2021 Eastern Intercollegiate Volleyball Association standings
	Conf.				Overall
Team	W		L	PCT	W		L	PCT
No. 8 Penn State ‍†‍‡‍^{y}	16	–	2	.889	22	–	4	.846
No. 11 NJIT ‍‍‍	13	–	3	.813	13	–	6	.684
No. 13 George Mason ‍‍‍	11	–	5	.688	15	–	7	.682
Saint Francis ‍‍‍	6	–	12	.333	8	–	19	.296
Charleston (WV) ‍‍‍	4	–	12	.250	4	–	13	.235
Sacred Heart ‍‍‍	0	–	16	.000	1	–	19	.050
† – Conference champion ‡ – EIVA tournament champion y – Invited to the NCAA tournament Rankings from AVCA

The 2021 Penn State Nittany Lions men's volleyball team represented Pennsylvania State University in the 2021 NCAA Division I & II men's volleyball season. The Nittany Lions, led by 27th-year head coach Mark Pavlik, played their home games at Rec Hall. The Nittany Lions were members of the Eastern Intercollegiate Volleyball Association and were picked to win the EIVA in the preseason poll. The Nittany Lions played mostly a conference schedule due to the COVID-19 pandemic. After winning the EIVA regular season and conference tournament titles the Nittany Lions qualified for the NCAA Tournament. After winning the opening round match the Nittany Lions fell in the semifinals to Lewis.

== Roster ==
2021 Penn State Nittany Lions roster
Defensive Specialist/Libero: 2 Tim Herget - Sophomore; 20 Will Bantle - (redshirt) Junior; Middle blockers: 13 Andrew Watts - Sophomore; 14 Sam Marsh - Junior; 15 Canyon Tuman - Junior; 16 Ian Argento - Freshman; 18 Tony Ezeonu - Freshman	Outside hitters: 2 Tim Herget - Sophomore; 3 Jack Shampine - Sophomore; 4 Michael Valenzi - Freshman; 5 Mitch Tucker - Freshman; 8 Michal Kowal - Freshman; 9 John Kerr - Sophomore; 10 Gabe Hartke - Sophomore; 12 Brett Wildman - Junior; 17 Will Kuhns - Freshman; 19 Cal Fisher - Junior	Opposite hitters: 7 Bogdan Ivanov - Freshman; 11 Jack Driscoll - Sophomore; 19 Cal Fisher - Junior; Setters: 1 Josh Tuaniga - Junior; 6 Cole Bogner - Junior; 11 Jack Driscoll - Sophomore

== Schedule ==
Date Time	Opponent	Rank	Arena City (Tournament)	Television	Score	Attendance	Record (EIVA Record)
1/22; 7 p.m.	@ #14 Ohio State	#11	Covelli Center; Columbus, OH	B1G+	W 3–0 (25–20, 25–23, 25–22)	0	1–0
1/23; 7 p.m.	@ #14 Ohio State	#11	Covelli Center; Columbus, OH	B1G+	L 0–3 (22–25, 23–25, 17–25)	0	1–1
1/29; 7 p.m.	#13 Ohio State	#11	Rec Hall; University Park, PA	B1G+	W 3–0 (25–16, 25–17, 25–21)	135	2–1
1/30; 2:30 p.m.	#13 Ohio State	#11	Rec Hall; University Park, PA	B1G+	W 3–0 (25–17, 25–16, 25–19)	134	3–1
2/4; 8 p.m.	St. Francis*	#11	Rec Hall; University Park, PA	B1G+	W 3–0 (25–17, 25–16, 25–19)	134	4–1 (1–0)
2/6; 1:30 p.m.	St. Francis*	#11	Rec Hall; University, Park, PA	B1G+	W 3–2 (25–27, 25–13, 23–25, 25–21, 16–14)	141	5–1 (2–0)
2/13; 3 p.m.	NJIT*	#11	Rec Hall South Gym; University Park, PA	B1G+	W 3–1 (25–17, 21–25, 25–17, 25–21)	97	6–1 (3–0)
2/14; 3 p.m.	NJIT*	#11	Rec Hall; University Park, PA	B1G+	L 0–3 (21–25, 22–25, 9–25)	128	6–2 (3–1)
2/20; 7 p.m.	Sacred Heart*	#12	William H. Pitt Center; Fairfield, CT	NEC Front Row	W 3–0 (25–16, 25–14, 25–15)	0	7–2 (4–1)
2/21; 1 p.m.	Sacred Heart*	#12	William H. Pitt Center; Fairfield, CT	NEC Front Row	W 3–1 (25–16, 25–17, 23–25, 25–19)	0	8–2 (5–1)
2/26; 7 p.m.	#12 George Mason*	#10	Rec Hall; University Park, PA	B1G+	W 3–1 (26–24, 25–20, 24–26, 25–16)	153	9–2 (6–1)
2/27; 7 p.m.	#12 George Mason*	#10	Rec Hall; University Park, PA	B1G+	W 3–0 (25–19, 25–21, 25–16)	163	10–2 (7–1)
3/5; 7 p.m.	Charleston (WV)*	#10	Rec Hall South Gym; University Park, PA	B1G+	W 3–0 (25–20, 25–14, 25–21)	20	11–2 (8–1)
3/6; 7 p.m.	Charleston (WV)*	#10	Rec Hall; University Park, PA	B1G+	W 3–0 (25–16, 25–23, 25–23)	133	12–2 (9–1)
3/12; 7 p.m.	St. Francis*	#9	DeGol Arena; Loretto, PA	NEC Front Row	Cancelled due to the COVID-19 pandemic		
3/13; 7 p.m.	St. Francis*	#9	DeGol Arena; Loretto, PA	NEC Front Row	Cancelled due to the COVID-19 pandemic		
3/19; 4 p.m.	#11 NJIT*	#9	Wellness and Events Center; Newark, NJ	America East TV	W 3–0 (33–31, 25–23, 25–21)	0	13–2 (10–1)
3/20; 4 p.m.	#11 NJIT*	#9	Wellness and Events Center; Newark, NJ	America East TV	W 3–0 (25–20, 25–18, 25–21)	0	14–2 (11–1)
3/26; 4 p.m.	Sacred Heart*	#8	Rec Hall; University Park, PA	B1G+	W 3–0 (25–13, 25–20, 25–18)	164	15–2 (12–1)
3/27; 2 p.m.	Sacred Heart*	#8	Rec Hall; University Park, PA	B1G+	W 3–0 (25–12, 25–17, 25–18)	110	16–2 (13–1)
4/2; 7 p.m.	#15 George Mason*	#8	Recreation Athletic Complex; Fairfax, VA	ESPN+	W 3–0 (25–19, 27–25, 25–16)	224	17–2 (14–1)
4/3; 7 p.m.	#15 George Mason*	#8	Recreation Athletic Complex; Fairfax, VA	ESPN+	L 2–3 (20–25, 25–12, 19–25, 25–23, 11–15)	250	17–3 (14–2)
4/9; 7 p.m.	Charleston (WV)*	#8	The Russell and Martha Wehrle Innovation Center; Charleston, WV	Mountain East Network	W 3–0 (25–12, 25–16, 25–15)	1	18–3 (15–2)
4/10; 7 p.m.	Charleston (WV)*	#8	The Russell and Martha Wehrle Innovation Center; Charleston, WV	Mountain East Network	W 3–0 (25–11, 25–6, 25–20)	0	19–3 (16–2)
4/22; 7:30 p.m.	St. Francis*	#8	Rec Hall; University Park, PA (EIVA Semifinal)	B1G+	W 3–0 (25–16, 25–22, 25–20)	340	20–3
4/20; 7 p.m.	#13 George Mason*	#8	Rec Hall; University Park, PA (EIVA Championship)	B1G+	W 3–1 (25–20, 25–20, 30–32, 25–20)	286	21–3
5/3; 5 p.m.	Belmont Abbey	#8	Covelli Center; Columbus, OH (NCAA 1st Round)	B1G+	W 3–0 (25–22, 25–13, 25–19)	223	22–3
5/4; 8 p.m.	#3 Lewis	#8	Covelli Center; Columbus, OH (NCAA Quarterfinal)	B1G+	L 0–3 (23–25, 25–27, 20–25)	144	22–4

*-Indicates conference match.
Times listed are Eastern Time Zone.

== Broadcasters ==
- Ohio State: No commentary
- Ohio State: No commentary
- Ohio State: Christopher Hess & Connor Griffin
- Ohio State: Christopher Hess & Jack McHugh
- St. Francis: Preston Shoemaker & Zach Donaldson
- St. Francis: Josh Starr & Andrew Destin
- NJIT: No commentary
- NJIT: Joe Skinner & DJ Bauer
- Sacred Heart: Corey Picard & Melissa Batie-Smoose
- Sacred Heart: Brendan Picozzi & Melissa Batie-Smoose
- George Mason: Jake Starr & Zech Lambert
- George Mason: David Hadar & Trevor Grady
- Charleston (WV): No commentary
- Charleston (WV): Joe Skinner & Matt McLaughlin
- NJIT: Ira Thor
- NJIT: Ira Thor
- Sacred Heart: Andrew Destin & Logan Bourandas
- Sacred Heart: David Hadar & Matt Scalzo
- George Mason: Brian McSweeney & Aylene Ilkson
- George Mason: Brian McSweeney & Valerie Preactor
- Charleston (WV): Jack Rivers
- Charleston (WV): Jack Rivers
- St. Francis: David Hadar & Jon Draeger
- George Mason: Preston Shoemaker & Logan Bourandas
- Belmont Abbey: Luke Wood Maloney & Ben Spurlock
- Lewis: Luke Wood Maloney & Ben Spurlock

== Honors ==
To be filled in upon completion of the season.
