= 2021 Mountain Pacific Sports Federation men's volleyball tournament =

Postseason men's volleyball tournament

2021 Mountain Pacific Sports Federation Men's Volleyball Tournament
- Classification: Division I/II
- Teams: 7
- Site: Smith Fieldhouse; Provo, Utah
- Champions: BYU (8th title)
- Winning coach: Shawn Olmstead (3rd title)
- MVP: Gabi Garcia Fernandez (BYU)
- Attendance: 700
- Television: FloVolleyball
- Mountain Pacific Sports Federation Men's Volleyball Tournaments

2021 Mountain Pacific Sports Federation volleyball standings
| | Conf. | | | | Overall |
| Team | W | | L | PCT | W | | L | PCT |
|---|---|---|---|---|---|---|---|---|
| No. 2 BYU ‍†‍‡‍^{y} | 17 | – | 3 | .850 | 20 | – | 4 | .833 |
| No. 6 UCLA ‍‍‍ | 14 | – | 5 | .737 | 15 | – | 6 | .714 |
| No. 5 Pepperdine ‍‍‍^{y} | 11 | – | 5 | .688 | 13 | – | 7 | .650 |
| No. 9 Grand Canyon ‍‍‍ | 8 | – | 10 | .444 | 9 | – | 11 | .450 |
| USC ‍‍‍ | 5 | – | 12 | .294 | 5 | – | 13 | .278 |
| Concordia Irvine ‍‍‍ | 3 | – | 13 | .188 | 3 | – | 14 | .176 |
| Stanford ‍‍‍ | 3 | – | 13 | .188 | 3 | – | 14 | .176 |
† – Conference champion ‡ – 2021 MPSF Tournament champion y- Invited to the NCAA Volleyball Tournament; As of 8 May 2021; Rankings from AVCA

The 2021 Mountain Pacific Sports Federation Volleyball Tournament was a postseason men's volleyball tournament for the Mountain Pacific Sports Federation during the 2021 NCAA Division I & II men's volleyball season. It was held April 22 through April 24, 2021 at Smith Fieldhouse in Provo, Utah. Smith Fieldhouse was chosen as the host venue so that family members and a select number of fans may attend the games. That number was later set at 700 per match. Had the tournament occurred anywhere within California, COVID-19 restrictions would have prevented any attendance.

The winner received The Federation's automatic bid to the 2021 NCAA Volleyball Tournament.

== Seeds ==
All seven teams are eligible for the postseason, with the #1 seed receiving a bye to the semifinals. Teams are seeded by record within the conference, with a tiebreaker system to seed teams with identical conference records. The #1 seed will play the lowest remaining seed in the semifinals.

Due to the possibility of an unbalanced number of league matches played this year, conference wins (NOT win percentage), will be the first criteria looked at to determine MPSF Tournament seeding. Conference win percentage will be the first tiebreaker.

| Seed | School | Conference | Tiebreaker |
|---|---|---|---|
| 1 | BYU | 17–3 | – |
| 2 | UCLA | 14–5 | – |
| 3 | Pepperdine | 11–5 | – |
| 4 | Grand Canyon | 8–10 | – |
| 5 | USC | 5–12 | – |
| 6 | Stanford | 3–13 | 2–0 vs. Concordia Irvine |
| 7 | Concordia Irvine | 3–13 | 0-2 vs. Stanford |

== Schedule and results ==
| Time Network | Matchup | Score | Attendance | Broadcasters |
Quarterfinals – Thursday, April 22
| 2 p.m. FloVolleyball | #2 UCLA vs. #7 Concorida Irvine | 3–1 (25–23, 21–25, 26–24, 25–20) | N/A | Jarom Jordan & Steve Vail |
| 5 p.m. FloVolleyball | #4 Grand Canyon vs. #5 USC | 3–1 (28–30, 25–20, 25–17, 25–23) | N/A | Jarom Jordan & Steve Vail |
| 8 p.m. FloVolleyball | #3 Pepperdine vs. #6 Stanford | 3–1 (25–22, 21–25, 25–22, 25–19) | N/A | Jarom Jordan & Steve Vail |
Semifinals – Friday, April 23
| 4 p.m. FloVolleyball | #2 UCLA vs. #3 Pepperdine | 0–3 (20–25, 23–25, 24–26) | 700 | Jarom Jordan & Steve Vail |
| 7 p.m. FloVolleyball | #1 BYU vs. #4 Grand Canyon | 3–0 (25–14, 25–19, 29–27) | 700 | Jarom Jordan & Steve Vail |
Championship – Saturday, April 24
| 7 p.m. FloVolleyball | #1 BYU vs. #3 Pepperdine | 3–0 (25–20, 25–15, 25–19) | 700 | Jarom Jordan & Steve Vail |
Game times are MT. Rankings denote tournament seeding.

== Bracket ==
Quarterfinals; Thursday, April 22; Smith Fieldhouse; Provo, UT
1 | BYU
(bye)
4 | Grand Canyon | 3
5 | USC | 2
(Pairings are reseeded after the first round)
2 | UCLA | 3
7 | Concordia Irvine | 1
3 | Pepperdine | 3
6 | Stanford | 1

Semifinals; Friday, April 23; Smith Fieldhouse; Provo, UT
1 | BYU | 3
4 | Grand Canyon | 0
2 | UCLA | 0
3 | Pepperdine | 3

Championship; Saturday, April 24; Smith Fieldhouse; Provo, UT
1 | BYU | 3
3 | Pepperdine | 0

== Game summaries ==
All times Mountain.

=== Quarterfinals ===
| April 22, 2021; 2:00 p.m. MDT | (2) UCLA | 3–1 | (7) Concordia Irvine | Smith Fieldhouse — Provo, UT |
| April 22, 2021; 2:00 p.m. MDT | (25–23, 21–25, 26–24, 25–20); Report | | | Smith Fieldhouse — Provo, UT |

| April 22, 2021; 5:00 p.m. MDT | (4) Grand Canyon | 3–1 | (5) USC | Smith Fieldhouse — Provo, UT |
| April 22, 2021; 5:00 p.m. MDT | (28–30, 25–20, 25–17, 25–23); Report | | | Smith Fieldhouse — Provo, UT |

| April 22, 2021; 8:00 p.m. MDT | (3) Pepperdine | 3–1 | (6) Stanford | Smith Fieldhouse — Provo, UT |
| April 22, 2021; 8:00 p.m. MDT | (25–22, 21–25, 25–22, 25–19); Report | | | Smith Fieldhouse — Provo, UT |

=== Semifinals ===
| April 23, 2021; 4:00 p.m. MDT | (2) UCLA | 0–3 | (3) Pepperdine | Smith Fieldhouse — Provo, UT; Attendance: 700; Referees: Bill Forrester, Ron Pelham, Heather Pickett, Ray Mink |
| April 23, 2021; 4:00 p.m. MDT | (20–25, 23–25, 24–26); Report | | | Smith Fieldhouse — Provo, UT; Attendance: 700; Referees: Bill Forrester, Ron Pelham, Heather Pickett, Ray Mink |

| April 23, 2021; 7:00 p.m. MDT | (1) BYU | 3–0 | (4) Grand Canyon | Smith Fieldhouse — Provo, UT; Attendance: 700; Referees: Ron Pelham, Ray Mink, Tom Ulibarri, Bill Forrester |
| April 23, 2021; 7:00 p.m. MDT | (25–14, 25–19, 29–27); Report | | | Smith Fieldhouse — Provo, UT; Attendance: 700; Referees: Ron Pelham, Ray Mink, Tom Ulibarri, Bill Forrester |

=== MPSF Championship ===
| April 24, 2021; 7:00 p.m. MDT | (1) BYU | 3–0 | (3) Pepperdine | Smith Fieldhouse — Provo, UT; Attendance: 700; Referees: Bill Forrester, Ray Mink, Jeff Merill, Ron Pelham |
| April 24, 2021; 7:00 p.m. MDT | (25–23, 25–15, 25–19); Report | | | Smith Fieldhouse — Provo, UT; Attendance: 700; Referees: Bill Forrester, Ray Mink, Jeff Merill, Ron Pelham |

== All-Tournament Team ==
- Gabi Garcia Fernandez-BYU (MVP)
- Zach Eschenberg-BYU
- Wil Stanley-BYU
- Jacob Steele-Pepperdine
- Austin Wilmot-Pepperdine
- Camden Gianni-Grand Canyon
- Cole Ketrzynski-UCLA
