= 2021 Independent Volleyball Association tournament =

2021 Independent Volleyball Association Men's Volleyball Tournament
- Classification: Division I/II
- Teams: 5
- Site: Curry Arena; Charlotte, NC
- Champions: Lincoln Memorial (3rd title)
- Winning coach: John Cash (3rd title)
- MVP: Johansen Negron (Lincoln Memorial)
- Television: Queens SN
- Independent Volleyball Association Men's Volleyball Tournaments

The 2021 Independent Volleyball Association Tournament was a men's volleyball tournament held by select Independent Universities during the 2021 NCAA Division I & II men's volleyball season. It was held April 16 through April 17, 2021 at Queens University of Charlotte's Curry Arena at the Levine Center. The winner is eligible for one of the two wildcard spots in the 2021 NCAA Volleyball Tournament and was granted the title of Independent Volleyball Association Champion.

2021 NCAA Division I & II men's volleyball Independent standings
	Conf.				Overall
Team	W		L	PCT	W		L	PCT
Lincoln Memorial ‍‍‡‍	5	–	1	.833	12	–	8	.600
Queens ‍‍‍	5	–	2	.714	14	–	12	.538
Limestone ‍‍‍	3	–	3	.500	12	–	11	.522
Tusculum ‍‍‍	2	–	6	.250	5	–	13	.278
Alderson Broaddus ‍‍‍	0	–	2	.000	5	–	8	.385
Daemen ‍‍‍	0	–	0	–	10	–	0	1.000
St. Francis Brooklyn ‍‍‍	0	–	0	–	3	–	3	.500
D'Youville ‍‍‍	0	–	0	–	3	–	5	.375
‡ – 2021 IVA Tournament champion Rankings from AVCA

== Seeds ==
Five teams will participate in the tournament after Limestone University left Conference Carolinas for the South Atlantic Conference. This will be Limestone's first IVA Tournament.

Seed	School	Conference
1	Lincoln Memorial	5–1
2	Queens	5–2
3	Limestone	3–3
4	Tusculum	2–6
5	Alderson Broaddus	0–2

== Schedule and results ==
Time Network	Matchup	Score	Attendance	Commentators	Report
First Round – Friday, April 16
1:00 pm Queens SN	No. 4 Tusculum vs. No. 5 Alderson Broaddus	3–0 (25–14, 25–15, 25–14)	16	Mike Glennon	Report
Semifinals – Friday, April 16
4:00 pm Queens SN	No. 2 Queens vs. No. 3 Limestone	3–0 (28–26, 25–18, 25–22)	142	Mike Glennon	Report
7:00 pm Queens SN	No. 1 Lincoln Memorial vs. No. 4 Tusculum	3–0 (25–21, 25–22, 25–20)	63	Mike Glennon	Report
Consolation – Saturday, April 17
1:00 pm Queens SN	No. 3 Limestone vs. No. 4 Tusculum	0–3 (23–25, 22–25, 20–25)	39	Mike Glennon	Report
Championship – Saturday, April 17
4:00 pm Queens SN	No. 1 Lincoln Memorial vs. No. 2 Queens	3–0 (25–23, 25–19, 25–23)	171	Mike Glennon	Report
Game times are ET. Rankings denote tournament seeding.

== Bracket ==
First Round; Friday, April 16
4	Tusculum	3
5	Alderson Broaddus	0

Semifinals; Friday, April 16
1	Lincoln Memorial	3
4	Tusculum	0
2	Queens	3
3	Limestone	0

Championship; Saturday, April 17
1	Lincoln Memorial	3
2	Queens	0
3rd Place; Saturday, April 17
3	Limestone	0
4	Tusculum	3

== All-Tournament Team ==
- Most Outstanding Player - Johansen Negron, Lincoln Memorial
- Pedro Carvahlo, Lincoln Memorial
- AJ Risavy, Lincoln Memorial
- Justin Sharfenaker, Lincoln Memorial
- Joshua Bragg, Queens
- Stirling Sims, Queens
- Tristan Santoyo, Queens
- Christos, Gkitersos, Limestone
- Caleb Slater, Tusculum
