= 1991 FIVB Volleyball Men's World Cup =

International volleyball competition

1991 Men's World Cup
Tournament details
- Host country: Japan
- Dates: 22 November – 1 December
- Teams: 12
- Venues: 5 (in 5 host cities)

Final positions
- Champions: Soviet Union (4th title)
- Runners-up: Cuba
- Third place: United States
- Fourth place: Japan

Tournament awards
- MVP: (Soviet Union) Dmitry Fomin

The 1991 FIVB Men's World Cup was held from 22 November to 1 December 1991 in Japan. The World Cup consisted of 12 teams: champions of 5 geographic areas (Asia, North America, South America, Africa, Europe), the four runners-up, the host country and two guest teams (wild card).

== Qualification ==
Means of qualification	Date	Host	Vacancies	Qualified
Host country	—	―	1	Japan
1991 Men's European Volleyball Championship	7–15 September 1991	Germany	1	Soviet Union
1991 Men's NORCECA Volleyball Championship	23 Aug – 2 Sep 1991	(Canada) Regina	2	Cuba
1991 Men's NORCECA Volleyball Championship	23 Aug – 2 Sep 1991	(Canada) Regina	2	United States
1991 Asian Men's Volleyball Championship	11–16 August 1991	(Australia) Perth	1	South Korea
1991 Men's South American Volleyball Championship	14–21 September 1991	(Brazil) São Paulo	1	Brazil
1991 Men's African Volleyball Championship	21–30 September 1991	(Egypt) Cairo	1	Algeria
Best not qualified teams for 1992 Summer Olympics (at the invitation of the FIVB)	―	―	5	Germany
Best not qualified teams for 1992 Summer Olympics (at the invitation of the FIVB)	―	―	5	Tunisia
Best not qualified teams for 1992 Summer Olympics (at the invitation of the FIVB)	―	―	5	Mexico
Best not qualified teams for 1992 Summer Olympics (at the invitation of the FIVB)	―	―	5	Iran
Best not qualified teams for 1992 Summer Olympics (at the invitation of the FIVB)	―	―	5	Chile
Total			12	

== Results ==
All times are Japan Standard Time (UTC+09:00).

=== First round ===
==== Pool A ====
Pos	Team	Pld	W	L	Pts	SW	SL	SR	SPW	SPL	SPR	Qualification
1	United States	5	5	0	10	15	5	3.000	290	189	1.534	Final places
2	Soviet Union	5	4	1	9	13	3	4.333	228	142	1.606	Final places
3	Japan	5	3	2	8	11	6	1.833	231	152	1.520	Final places
4	Tunisia	5	2	3	7	7	10	0.700	166	224	0.741	7th–12th places
5	Mexico	5	1	4	6	5	13	0.385	173	254	0.681	7th–12th places
6	Chile	5	0	5	5	1	15	0.067	112	239	0.469	7th–12th places

Location: Osaka

Date		Score		Set 1	Set 2	Set 3	Set 4	Set 5	Total
22 Nov	Soviet Union	3–0	Tunisia	15–4	15–7	15–5			45–16
22 Nov	United States	3–0	Chile	15–6	15–5	15–2			45–13
22 Nov	Japan	3–0	Mexico	15–4	15–5	15–1			45–10
23 Nov	United States	3–1	Soviet Union	15–13	13–15	15–13	15–7		58–48
23 Nov	Tunisia	3–1	Mexico	12–15	15–7	15–12	16–14		58–48
23 Nov	Japan	3–0	Chile	15–2	15–4	15–3			45–9
24 Nov	Soviet Union	3–0	Mexico	15–7	15–5	15–11			45–23
24 Nov	Tunisia	3–0	Chile	15–11	15–9	15–8			45–28
24 Nov	United States	3–2	Japan	13–15	15–6	17?–15?	13?–15?	15–12	73–63

Location: Hiroshima

Date		Score		Set 1	Set 2	Set 3	Set 4	Set 5	Total
26 Nov	Soviet Union	3–0	Chile	15–3	15–5	15–4			45–12
26 Nov	Japan	3–0	Tunisia	15–2	15–4	15–9			45–15
26 Nov	United States	3–1	Mexico	11–15	15–5	15–6	15–7		56–33
27 Nov	Mexico	3–1	Chile	15–10	16–14	13–15	15–11		59–50
27 Nov	United States	3–1	Tunisia	15–1	15–3	13–15	15–13		58–32
27 Nov	Soviet Union	3–0	Japan	15–10	15–12	15–11			45–33

==== Pool B ====
Pos	Team	Pld	W	L	Pts	SW	SL	SR	SPW	SPL	SPR	Qualification
1	Cuba	5	5	0	10	15	2	7.500	249	116	2.147	Final places
2	Brazil	5	4	1	9	12	6	2.000	224	168	1.333	Final places
3	South Korea	5	3	2	8	12	9	1.333	272	247	1.101	Final places
4	Germany	5	2	3	7	10	9	1.111	234	215	1.088	7th–12th places
5	Algeria	5	1	4	6	4	12	0.333	121	221	0.548	7th–12th places
6	Iran	5	0	5	5	0	15	0.000	92	225	0.409	7th–12th places

Location: Gifu

Date		Score		Set 1	Set 2	Set 3	Set 4	Set 5	Total
22 Nov	Cuba	3–0	Algeria	15–2	15–1	15–8			45–11
22 Nov	Germany	3–0	Iran	15–4	15–11	15–6			45–21
22 Nov	Brazil	3–2	South Korea	10–15	15–10	12–15	15–13	15–9	67–62
23 Nov	Germany	3–0	Algeria	15–9	15–4	15–6			45–19
23 Nov	Brazil	3–0	Iran	15–2	15–7	15–2			45–11
23 Nov	Cuba	3–1	South Korea	15–6	15–13	12–15	15–11		57–45
24 Nov	Cuba	3–0	Brazil	15–3	15–7	15–2			45–12
24 Nov	Algeria	3–0	Iran	15–10	15–9	15–10			45–29
24 Nov	South Korea	3–2	Germany	15–8	5–15	11–15	15–10	17–15	63–63

Location: Matsumoto

Date		Score		Set 1	Set 2	Set 3	Set 4	Set 5	Total
26 Nov	Cuba	3–0	Iran	15–5	15–3	15–2			45–10
26 Nov	Brazil	3–1	Germany	15–9	15–7	10–15	15–12		55–43
26 Nov	South Korea	3–1	Algeria	12–15	15–12	15–9	15–3		57–39
27 Nov	Cuba	3–1	Germany	12–15	15–9	15–6	15–8		57–38
27 Nov	South Korea	3–0	Iran	15–12	15–4	15–5			45–21
27 Nov	Brazil	3–0	Algeria	15–0	15–4	15–3			45–7

=== Final round ===
The results and the points of the matches between the same teams that were already played during the first round are taken into account for the final round.

==== 7th–12th places ====
Location: Tokyo

Pos	Team	Pld	W	L	Pts	SW	SL	SR	SPW	SPL	SPR
7	Germany	5	5	0	10	15	0	MAX	0	0	—
8	Tunisia	5	4	1	9	12	7	1.714	242	226	1.071
9	Algeria	5	3	2	8	11	10	1.100	0	0	—
10	Mexico	5	2	3	7	9	11	0.818	0	0	—
11	Iran	5	1	4	6	5	14	0.357	0	0	—
12	Chile	5	0	5	5	5	15	0.333	0	0	—

Date		Score		Set 1	Set 2	Set 3	Set 4	Set 5	Total
29 Nov	Algeria	3–2	Mexico	?–?	?–?	?–?	?–?	?–?	?–?
29 Nov	Tunisia	3–1	Iran	15–9	15–7	14–16	15–7		59–39
29 Nov	Germany	3–0	Chile	?–?	?–?	?–?			?–?
30 Nov	Germany	3–0	Mexico	15–9	15–4	15–10			45–23
30 Nov	Tunisia	3–2	Algeria	15–13	15–13	9–15	8–15	15–10	62–66
30 Nov	Iran	3–2	Chile	?–?	?–?	?–?	?–?	?–?	?–?
1 Dec	Mexico	3–1	Iran	?–?	?–?	?–?	?–?		?–?
1 Dec	Germany	3–0	Tunisia	15–5	15–7	15–6			45–18
1 Dec	Algeria	3–2	Chile	?–?	?–?	?–?	?–?	?–?	?–?

==== Final places ====
Location: Tokyo

Pos	Team	Pld	W	L	Pts	SW	SL	SR	SPW	SPL	SPR
1	Soviet Union	5	4	1	9	13	4	3.250	242	189	1.280
2	Cuba	5	4	1	9	12	4	3.000	224	145	1.545
3	United States	5	4	1	9	12	9	1.333	281	250	1.124
4	Japan	5	1	4	6	7	13	0.538	229	273	0.839
5	South Korea	5	1	4	6	7	14	0.500	232	285	0.814
6	Brazil	5	1	4	6	7	14	0.500	224	290	0.772

Date		Score		Set 1	Set 2	Set 3	Set 4	Set 5	Total
29 Nov	United States	3–1	South Korea	15–5	8–15	15–7	15–5		53–32
29 Nov	Soviet Union	3–1	Brazil	13–15	15–13	15–4	15–5		58–37
29 Nov	Cuba	3–0	Japan	15–6	15–4	15–4			45–14
30 Nov	Soviet Union	3–0	Cuba	15–10	15–13	15–9			45–32
30 Nov	United States	3–2	Brazil	11–15	15–7	15–12	12–15	15–13	68–62
30 Nov	South Korea	3–2	Japan	12–15	7–15	15–8	15–12	15–12	64–62
1 Dec	Soviet Union	3–0	South Korea	15–7	16–14	15–8			46–29
1 Dec	Cuba	3–0	United States	15–9	15–12	15–8			45–29
1 Dec	Japan	3–1	Brazil	15–11	15–9	12–15	15–11		57–46

== Final standing ==
Rank	Team
1st place, gold medalist(s)	Soviet Union
2nd place, silver medalist(s)	Cuba
3rd place, bronze medalist(s)	United States
4	Japan
5	South Korea
6	Brazil
7	Germany
8	Tunisia
9	Algeria
10	Mexico
11	Iran
12	Chile

Qualified for the 1992 Summer Olympics

1991 Men's World Cup champions

Soviet Union
4th title

Team roster
Evgeni Krasilnikov, Dmitry Fomin, Oleg Shatunov, Ruslan Olikhver, Aleksandr Shadchin, Konstantin Ushakov, Yuri Koroviansky, Yuri Cherednik, Sergey Kukartsev, Sergey Vladimirovich Gorbunov
Head coach
Viacheslav Platonov

== Awards ==
- Most valuable player
  (Soviet Union) Dmitry Fomin
- Best spiker
  (Soviet Union) Dmitry Fomin
- Best blocker
  (United States) Bryan Ivie
- Best server
  (Cuba) Raúl Diago
- Best setter
  (South Korea) Shin Young-chul
- Best receiver
  (South Korea) Noh Jin-soo
- Best digger
  (United States) Uvaldo Acosta
