= 2021 Big West Conference men's volleyball tournament =

2021 Big West Conference Men's Volleyball Tournament
- Classification: Division I/II
- Teams: 6
- Site: SimpliFi Arena at Stan Sheriff Center; Honolulu, Hawaii
- Champions: UC Santa Barbara (1st title)
- Winning coach: Rick McLaughlin (1st title)
- MVP: Ryan Wilcox (UC Santa Barbara)
- Television: Spectrum Sports
- Big West Conference Men's Volleyball Tournaments

2021 Big West Conference men's volleyball standings
	Conf.				Overall
Team	W		L	PCT	W		L	PCT
No. 1 Hawaii ‍†‍‍^{y}	10	–	0	1.000	17	–	1	.944
No. 3 UC Santa Barbara ‍‍‡‍^{y}	7	–	3	.700	16	–	5	.762
No. 7 Long Beach State ‍‍‍	6	–	4	.600	7	–	5	.583
No. 14 UC San Diego ‍‍‍	3	–	7	.300	5	–	13	.278
Cal State Northridge ‍‍‍	2	–	8	.200	2	–	9	.182
UC Irvine ‍‍‍	2	–	8	.200	2	–	14	.125
† – Conference champion ‡ – Big West tournament champion y – Invited to the NCAA tournament Rankings from AVCA

The 2021 Big West Conference men's volleyball tournament is a postseason men's volleyball tournament for the Big West Conference during the 2021 NCAA Division I & II men's volleyball season. It was held April 22 through April 24, 2021 at the SimpliFi Arena at Stan Sheriff Center in Honolulu, Hawaii. The winner received the conference's automatic bid to the 2021 NCAA Volleyball Tournament.

== Seeds ==
All six teams were eligible for the postseason, with the top two seeds receiving byes to the semifinals. Teams were seeded by record within the conference, with a tiebreaker system to seed teams with identical conference records.

Seed	School	Conference	Tiebreaker
1	Hawai'i	10–0	–
2	UC Santa Barbara	7–3	–
3	Long Beach State	6–4	–
4	UC San Diego	3–7	–
5	CSUN	2–8	1–1 UC Irvine, points vs. UC Irvine won 178 to 171
6	UC Irvine	2–8	1–1 vs. CSUN, points vs. CSUN lost 171 to 178

== Schedule and results ==
Time Network	Matchup	Score	Attendance	Broadcasters	Report
Quarterfinals – Thursday, April 22
4:30 p.m. SPEC HI	No. 3 Long Beach State vs. No. 6 UC Irvine	3–0 (25–22, 25–19, 25–21)	0	Kanoa Leahey & Lisa Strand	Report
7:00 p.m. SPEC HI	No. 4 UC San Diego vs. No. 5 CSUN	3–1 (20–25, 25–23, 25–16, 25–23)	0	Kanoa Leahey & Lisa Strand	Report
Semifinals – Friday, April 23
7:00 p.m. SPEC HI	No. 1 Hawai'i vs. No. 4 UC San Diego	2–3 (25–22, 23–25, 25–16, 23–25, 16–18)	0	Kanoa Leahey & Lisa Strand	Report
4:30 p.m. SPEC HI	No. 2 UC Santa Barbara vs. No. 3 Long Beach State	3–1 (25–16, 17–25, 25–18, 25–18)	0	Kanoa Leahey & Lisa Strand	Report
Championship – Saturday, April 24
7:00 p.m. SPEC HI	No. 2 UC Santa Barbara vs. No. 4 UC San Diego	3–1 (22–25, 27–25, 25–21, 25–20)	0	Kanoa Leahey & Lisa Strand	Report
Game times are Hawaiian Time. Rankings denote tournament seeding.

== Bracket ==
Quarterfinals; Thursday, April 22
4	UC San Diego	3
5	CSUN	1
3	Long Beach State	3
6	UC Irvine	0

Semifinals; Friday, April 23
1	Hawai'i	2
4	UC San Diego	3
2	UC Santa Barbara	3
3	Long Beach State	1

Championship; Saturday, April 24
4	UC San Diego	1
2	UC Santa Barbara	3
