= 2021 Midwestern Intercollegiate Volleyball Association tournament =

2021 Midwestern Intercollegiate Volleyball Association Men's Volleyball Tournament
- Classification: Division I/II
- Teams: 8
- Champions: Lewis Flyers (6th title)
- Winning coach: Dan Friend (3rd title)
- MVP: Ryan Coenen (Lewis)
- Midwestern Intercollegiate Volleyball Association Men's Volleyball Tournaments

The 2021 Midwestern Intercollegiate Volleyball Association Tournament is the men's volleyball tournament for the Midwestern Intercollegiate Volleyball Association held during the 2021 NCAA Division I & II men's volleyball season. It was held April 10 through April 24, 2021 at campus sites. The winner received the Association's automatic bid to the 2021 NCAA Volleyball Tournament.

2021 Midwestern Intercollegiate Volleyball Association standings
| | Conf. | | | | Overall |
| Team | W | | L | PCT | W | | L | PCT |
|---|---|---|---|---|---|---|---|---|
| No. 4 Lewis ‍†‍‡‍^{y} | 12 | – | 2 | .857 | 21 | – | 3 | .875 |
| No. 10 Loyola Chicago ‍‍‍ | 9 | – | 5 | .643 | 15 | – | 6 | .714 |
| No. 12 McKendree ‍‍‍ | 9 | – | 5 | .643 | 11 | – | 6 | .647 |
| No. 15 Ball State ‍‍‍ | 8 | – | 6 | .571 | 13 | – | 9 | .591 |
| Ohio State ‍‍‍ | 8 | – | 6 | .571 | 9 | – | 10 | .474 |
| Purdue Fort Wayne ‍‍‍ | 6 | – | 8 | .429 | 6 | – | 9 | .400 |
| Lindenwood ‍‍‍ | 2 | – | 12 | .143 | 5 | – | 13 | .278 |
| Quincy ‍‍‍ | 2 | – | 12 | .143 | 5 | – | 13 | .278 |
† – Conference champion ‡ – MIVA tournament champion y – Invited to the NCAA tournament Rankings from AVCA

== Seeds ==
All eight teams are eligible for the postseason, with the highest seed hosting each round. Teams were seeded by record within the conference, with a tiebreaker system to seed teams with identical conference records.

| Seed | School | Conference | Tiebreaker |
|---|---|---|---|
| 1 | Lewis | 12–2 | – |
| 2 | Loyola Chicago | 9–5 | 2–0 vs. McKendree |
| 3 | McKendree | 9–5 | 0–2 vs. Loyola |
| 4 | Ball State | 8–6 | Point tiebreaker 216-209 vs. Ohio State |
| 5 | Ohio State | 8–6 | Point tiebreaker 209-216 vs. Ball State |
| 6 | Purdue Fort Wayne | 6–8 | – |
| 7 | Lindenwood | 2–12 | Point tiebreaker 184-175 vs. Quincy |
| 8 | Quincy | 2–12 | Point tiebreaker 175-184 vs. Lindenwood |

== Schedule and results ==
| Time Network | Matchup | Score | Attendance | Broadcasters |
Quarterfinals – Saturday, April 10
| 7:00 pm GLVC SN | No. 1 Lewis vs. No. 8 Quincy | 3–0 (25–20, 25–21, 25–15) | 120 | Matt Mohan & Patrick Hennessey |
| 7:00 pm ESPN+ | No. 2 Loyola Chicago vs. No. 7 Lindenwood | 3–1 (25–19, 25–21, 24–26, 25–23) | 0 | Jason Goch & Ray Gooden |
| 7:00 pm GLVC SN | No. 3 McKendree vs. No. 6 Purdue Fort Wayne | 3–2 (27–25, 20–25, 29–27, 25–27, 15–13) | 0 | Colin Suhre |
| 7:00 pm Ball State All-Access | No. 4 Ball State vs. No. 5 Ohio State | 3–1 (31–29, 25–19, 21–25, 28–26) | 0 | No commentary |
Semifinals – Saturday, April 17
| 5:00 pm ESPN+ | No. 2 Loyola Chicago vs. No. 3 McKendree | 3–2 (17–25, 12–25, 25–23, 25–22, 15–9) | 0 | Jason Goch & Ray Gooden |
| 7:00 pm GLVC SN | No. 1 Lewis vs. No. 4 Ball State | 3–0 (25–15, 25–20, 25–23) | 150 | Patrick Hennessey & Cody Lindeman |
Championship – Saturday, April 24
| 7:00 pm GLVC SN | No. 1 Lewis vs. No. 2 Loyola Chicago | 3–0 (25–14, 25–22, 25–19) | 160 | Patrick Hennessey & Cody Lindeman |
Game times are host team times (ET and CT). Rankings denote tournament seeding.

== Bracket ==
Quarterfinals; Saturday, April 10
1 | Lewis | 3
8 | Quincy | 0
4 | Ball State | 3
5 | Ohio State | 1
2 | Loyola Chicago | 3
7 | Lindenwood | 1
3 | McKendree | 3
6 | Purdue Fort Wayne | 2

Semifinals; Saturday, April 17
1 | Lewis | 3
4 | Ball State | 0
2 | Loyola Chicago | 3
3 | McKendree | 2

Championship; Saturday, April 24
1 | Lewis | 3
2 | Loyola Chicago | 0
