= 2021 Lewis Flyers men's volleyball team =

American college volleyball season

2021 Lewis Flyers men's volleyball

MIVA Champions

NCAA Tournament, L, Semifinals
- Conference: Midwestern Intercollegiate Volleyball Association
- Record: 21-3 (12-2 MIVA)
- Head coach: Dan Friend (17th season)
- Assistant coaches: Bryan Johnwick (8th season); Jacob Kerschner (1st season)
- Home arena: Neil Carey Arena

The 2021 Lewis Flyers men's volleyball team represented Lewis University in the 2021 NCAA Division I & II men's volleyball season. The Flyers, led by seventeenth year head coach Dan Friend, played their home games at Neil Carey Arena. The Flyers were members of the Midwestern Intercollegiate Volleyball Association and were picked to win the MIVA in the preseason poll.

2021 Midwestern Intercollegiate Volleyball Association standings
	Conf.				Overall
Team	W		L	PCT	W		L	PCT
No. 4 Lewis ‍†‍‡‍^{y}	12	–	2	.857	21	–	3	.875
No. 10 Loyola Chicago ‍‍‍	9	–	5	.643	14	–	6	.700
No. 12 McKendree ‍‍‍	9	–	5	.643	11	–	5	.688
No. 15 Ball State ‍‍‍	8	–	6	.571	12	–	7	.632
Ohio State ‍‍‍	8	–	6	.571	9	–	10	.474
Purdue Fort Wayne ‍‍‍	6	–	8	.429	6	–	9	.400
Lindenwood ‍‍‍	2	–	12	.143	5	–	13	.278
Quincy ‍‍‍	2	–	12	.143	5	–	13	.278
† – Conference champion ‡ – 2021 MIVA Tournament champion y- Invited to the NCAA Volleyball Tournament; As of 8 May 2021; Rankings from AVCA

== Roster ==
2021 Lewis Flyers roster
Defensive Specialist/Libero: 4 Marty Jepsen - Sophomore; 5 Jason Gibbs - (redshirt) Sophomore; 13 Connor Keating - Freshman; 24 Carlos Jimenez - (redshirt) Junior; Middle blockers: 2 Tyler Simpson - Freshman; 7 Joe Kenzinger - (redshirt) Junior; 8 Tyler Mitchem - (redshirt) Senior; 15 TJ Murray - (redshirt) Senior; 17 Michael Sack - (redshirt) Freshman; 20 Davon Lampkin - Sophomore	Outside hitters: 1 Cole Brillhart - (redshirt) Sophomore; 3 Inaki Bustamante - Sophomore; 9 Ryan Coenen - Senior; 11 Landon Krause - Freshman; 12 Jared Phelan - (redshirt) Freshman; 13 Connor Keating - Freshman; 14 Liam Buck - Freshman; 15 Cooper Armstrong - Freshman; 16 Keaton Long - Freshman; 21 Kyle Bugee - Senior; 22 John Davis - Junior	Opposite hitters: 2 Tyler Simpson - Freshman; 11 Landon Krause - Freshman; 14 Liam Buck - Freshman; 16 Keaton Long - Freshman; 19 Carter Burzlaff - (redshirt) Freshman; 23 Colin McClintic - (redshirt) Junior; Setters: 6 Kevin Kauling - Sophomore; 15 Cooper Armstrong - Freshman; 19 Carter Burzlaff - (redshirt) Freshman

== Schedule ==
TV/Internet Streaming information:

All home games will be televised on GLVC SN. All road games will also be streamed on the oppositions streaming service. The NCAA Tournament will be streamed on B1G+ (opening round, quarterfinals), NCAA.com (semifinals), and the Championship will be televised nationally on ESPNU.

Date Time	Opponent	Rank^{(Tournament Seed)}	Arena City (Tournament)	Television	Score	Attendance	Record (MIVA Record)
1/20; 7 p.m.	Campbellsville	#5	Neil Carey Arena; Romeoville, IL	GLVC SN	W 3–1 (22–9, 25–16, 30–32, 25–16)	0	1–0
1/22; 7 p.m.	Queens	#5	Neil Carey Arena; Romeoville, IL	GLVC SN	W 3–0 (25–19, 25–19, 25–18)	0	2–0
1/23; 7 p.m.	Lincoln Memorial	#5	Neil Carey Arena; Romeoville, IL	GLVC SN	W 3–0 (25–22, 25–22, 25–21)	0	3–0
1/29; 11 a.m.	@ St. Francis	#4	DeGol Arena; Loretto, PA	NEC Front Row	W 3–0 (26–24, 25–20, 25–23)	0	4–0
1/30; 11 a.m.	vs. NJIT	#4	DeGol Arena; Loretto, PA	NEC Front Row	W 3–2 (23–25, 15–25, 25–19, 27–25, 15–12)	0	5–0
2/5; 12 p.m.	@ Ohio State*	#3	Covelli Center; Columbus, OH	B1G+	L 1–3 (25–27, 16–25, 25–22, 23–25)	74	5–1 (0–1)
2/6; 12 p.m.	@ Ohio State*	#3	Covelli Center; Columbus, OH	B1G+	W 3–0 (25–23, 25–21, 25–11)	67	6–1 (1–1)
3/19; 7 p.m.	Purdue Fort Wayne*	#4	Neil Carey Arena; Romeoville, IL	GLVC SN	W 3–1 (25–20, 25–18, 16–25, 25–20)	0	7–1 (2–1)
3/20; 6 p.m.	Purdue Fort Wayne*	#4	Neil Carey Arena; Romeoville, IL	GLVC SN	W 3–2 (26–28, 26–28, 25–18, 25–18, 16–14)	0	8–1 (3–1)
3/26; 7 p.m.	#13 McKendree*	#3	Neil Carey Arena; Romeoville, IL	GLVC SN	L 1–3 (21–25, 25–19, 19–25, 22–25)	0	8–2 (3–2)
3/5; 7 p.m.	Ball State*	#5	Neil Carey Arena; Romeoville, IL	GLVC SN	W 3–0 (25–17, 25–23, 25–21)	0	9–2 (4–2)
3/6; 6 p.m.	Ball State*	#5	Neil Carey Arena; Romeoville, IL	GLVC SN	W 3–0 (25–13, 25–19 25–19)	0	10–2 (5–2)
3/12; 7 p.m.	@ #6 McKendree*	#5	Melvin Price Convocation Center; Lebanon, IL	GLVC SN	W 3–0 (25–18, 25–22, 25–22)	0	11–2 (6–2)
3/19; 7 p.m.	@ Lindenwood*	#5	Robert F. Hyland Arena; St. Charles, MO	GLVC SN	W 3–0 (25–18, 25–17, 32–30)	0	12–2 (7–2)
3/21; 1 p.m.	@ Lindenwood*	#5	Robert F. Hyland Arena; St. Charles, MO	GLVC SN	W 3–0 (25–23, 25–17, 31–29)	0	13–2 (8–2)
3/26; 7 p.m.	Quincy*	#4	Neil Carey Arena; Romeoville, IL	GLVC SN	W 3–0 (25–14, 25–17, 25–12)	73	14–2 (9–2)
3/27; 6 p.m.	Quincy*	#4	Neil Carey Arena; Romeoville, IL	GLVC SN	W 3–0 (25–17, 25–20, 25–19)	175	15–2 (10–2)
5/8; 2 p.m.	#10 Loyola Chicago*	#5	Alfie Norville Practice Facility; Chicago, IL	ESPN+	W 3–0 (25–18, 25–22, 25–21)	0	16–2 (11–2)
5/8; 2 p.m.	#10 Loyola Chicago*	#5	Alfie Norville Practice Facility; Chicago, IL	ESPN3	W 3–2 (22–25, 25–23, 26–24, 18–25, 15–8)	0	17–2 (12–2)
4/10; 7 p.m.	^{(8)} Quincy	#4 ^{(1)}	Neil Carey Arena; Romeoville, IL (MIVA Quarterfinal)	GLVC SN	W 3–0 (25–20, 25–21, 25–15)	120	18–2
4/17; 7 p.m.	^{(4)} Ball State	#4 ^{(1)}	Neil Carey Arena; Romeoville, IL (MIVA Semifinal)	GLVC SN	W 3–0 (25–15, 25–20, 25–23)	150	19–2
4/24; 7 p.m.	#10 ^{(2)} Loyola Chicago	#4 ^{(1)}	Neil Carey Arena; Romeoville, IL (MIVA Championship)	GLVC SN	W 3–0 (25–14, 25–22, 25–19)	160	20–2
5/4; 7 p.m.	#7 Penn State	#4	Covelli Center; Columbus, OH (NCAA Quarterfinal)	B1G+	W 3–0 (25–23, 27–25, 25–20)	144	21–2
5/6; 7 p.m.	#2 ^{(2)} BYU	#4	Covelli Center; Columbus, OH (NCAA Semifinal)	NCAA.com	L 1–3 (22–25, 15–25, 28–26, 20–25)	275	21–3

*-Indicates conference match.
Times listed are Central Time Zone.

== Announcers for televised games ==
- Campbellsville (KY): No commentary
- Queens: Matt Mohan & Reid Pohland
- Lincoln Memorial: Matt Mohan & Patrick Hennessey
- St. Francis: Jake Slebodnick
- NJIT: No commentary
- Ohio State: No commentary
- Ohio State: No commentary
- Purdue Fort Wayne: Matt Mohan & Cody Lindeman
- Purdue Fort Wayne: Patrick Hennessey & Matt Mohan
- McKendree: Matt Mohan & Cody Lindeman
- Ball State: Matt Mohan & Patrick Hennessey
- Ball State: Matt Mohan & Cody Lindeman
- McKendree: Colin Suhre
- Lindenwood: No commentary
- Lindenwood: No commentary
- Quincy: Matt Mohan & Patrick Hennessey
- Quincy: Matt Mohan & Cody Lindeman
- Loyola (Chicago): Jason Goch & Ray Gooden
- Loyola (Chicago): Jason Goch & Ray Gooden
- Quincy: Matt Mohan & Patrick Hennessey
- Ball State: Patrick Hennessey & Cody Lindeman
- Loyola (Chicago): Patrick Hennessey & Cody Lindeman
- Penn State: Luke Wood Maloney & Ben Spurlock
- BYU: Paul Sunderland & Kevin Barnett
