= 2021 Conference Carolinas men's volleyball tournament =

Postseason collegiate volleyball tournament

2021 Conference Carolinas Men's Volleyball Tournament
- Classification: Division I/II
- Teams: 8
- Site: Student Center Complex; Bristol, Tennessee
- Champions: Belmont Abbey (1st title)
- Winning coach: Nolan Albrecht (1st title)
- MVP: Brennan Davis (Belmont Abbey)
- Television: Conference Carolinas DN
- Conference Carolinas Men's Volleyball Tournaments

The 2021 Conference Carolinas men's volleyball tournament is the men's volleyball tournament for Conference Carolinas during the 2021 NCAA Division I & II men's volleyball season. It was held April 8 through April 18, 2021. First Round and Quarterfinal matches were held at campus sites while the semifinals and championship were held at Student Center Complex in Bristol, Tennessee. The winner received the conference's automatic bid to the 2021 NCAA Volleyball Tournament.

2021 Conference Carolinas men's volleyball standings
	Conf.				Overall
Team	W		L	PCT	W		L	PCT
Mount Olive ‍†‍‍	11	–	2	.846	13	–	4	.765
Belmont Abbey ‍‍‡‍^{y}	9	–	5	.643	15	–	8	.652
North Greenville ‍‍‍	7	–	4	.636	13	–	5	.722
Barton ‍‍‍	7	–	6	.538	9	–	10	.474
King ‍‍‍	7	–	7	.500	12	–	13	.480
Emmanuel ‍‍‍	6	–	8	.429	10	–	13	.435
Erskine ‍‍‍	4	–	9	.308	9	–	15	.375
Lees–McRae ‍‍‍	2	–	12	.143	2	–	19	.095
† – Conference champion ‡ – Conference Carolinas tournament champion y – Invited to the NCAA tournament Rankings from AVCA

== Seeds ==
All 8 teams are eligible for the postseason. A bye system is used awarding higher seeds byes to the quarter and semifinals. Teams are seeded by record within the conference, with a tiebreaker system to seed teams with identical conference records.

Seed	School	Conference	Tiebreaker
1	Mount Olive	11–2	–
2	Belmont Abbey	9–5	–
3	North Greenville	7–4	–
4	Barton	7–6	–
5	King	7–7	–
6	Emmanuel	6–9	–
7	Erskine	4–9	–
8	Lees-McRae	2–12	–

== Schedule and results ==
Time	Matchup	Score	Attendance	Broadcasters	Report
First Round – Thursday, April 8
7:00 pm Conference Carolinas DN	No. 5 King vs. No. 8 Lees-McRae	3–0 (25–22, 25–18, 25–18)	49	Brittany Ramsey & Julie Ward	Report
7:00 pm Conference Carolinas DN	No. 6 Emmanuel vs. No. 7 Erskine	3–0 (25–21, 25–13, 25–18)	30	Logan Reese	Report
Quarterfinals – Tuesday, April 13
7:00 pm No Broadcast– Stream Crashed	No. 4 Barton vs. No. 5 King	0–3 (21–25, 25–27, 20–25)	100	–	Report
7:00 pm Conference Carolinas DN	No. 3 North Greenville vs. No. 6 Emmanuel	3–0 (25–19, 25–16, 25–21)	134	Avery Norris	Report
Semifinals – Saturday, April 17
12:00 pm Conference Carolinas DN	No. 1 Mount Olive vs. No. 5 King	3–1 (29–27, 24–26, 25–16, 27–25)	123	Matt Stradley	Report
2:30 pm Conference Carolinas DN	No. 2 Belmont Abbey vs. No. 3 North Greenville	3–1 (25–20, 23–25, 25–19, 25–20)	87	Matt Stradley	Report
Championship – Sunday, April 18
1:00 pm Conference Carolinas DN	No. 1 Mount Olive vs. No. 2 Belmont Abbey	1–3 (22–25, 25–27, 25–23, 22–25)	123	Matt Stradley	
All game times are ET. Rankings denote tournament seeding.

== Bracket ==
First Round; Thursday, April 8
5	King	3
8	Lees-McRae	0
6	Emmanuel	3
7	Erskine	0

Quarter finals Tuesday, April 13
4	Barton	0
5	King	3
3	North Greenville	3
6	Emmanuel	0

Semi-finals; Saturday, April 17
1	Mount Olive	3
5	King	1
2	Belmont Abbey	3
3	North Greenville	1

Finals; Sunday, April 18
1	Mount Olive	1
2	Belmont Abbey	3

== All–Tournament Team ==
- Most Outstanding Player - Brennan Davis, Belmont Abbey
- Joshua Kim, King
- Diego Rosich, North Greenville
- Eric Visgitis, Mount Olive
- Trevor Tresser, Mount Olive
- Matteo Miselli, Belmont Abbey
- Daniel Cerqua, Belmont Abbey
