= 2021 Hawaii Rainbow Warriors volleyball team =

American college volleyball season

2021 Hawaii Rainbow Warriors volleyball

Big West Regular Season Champions

NCAA Champions
- Conference: Big West Conference
- Record: 17-1 (10-0 Big West)
- Head coach: Charlie Wade (12th season)
- Assistant coaches: Milan Zarkovic (8th season); Josh Walker (6th season)
- Home stadium: Stan Sheriff Center

The 2021 Hawaii Rainbow Warriors volleyball team represented the University of Hawaiʻi at Mānoa (UH) in the 2021 NCAA Division I & II men's volleyball season. The Rainbow Warriors, led by 12th-year head coach Charlie Wade, played home games at Stan Sheriff Center on the UH campus in the Honolulu neighborhood of Mānoa. The Rainbow Warriors, members of the Big West Conference, were picked by Big West coaches to win the conference in its preseason poll. After a late start was announced, Hawaii went undefeated in conference play. The Rainbow Warriors suffered their first and only setback in the semifinals of the Big West Tournament, forcing them to receive an at-large bid to the NCAA Tournament. Despite the setback, Hawai'i received the #1 seed in the national tournament and went on to win the National Championship with straight set wins over UC Santa Barbara in the semifinals and BYU in the national championship. The national championship is Hawai'i's first men's volleyball national championship after they had to vacate the 2002 national championship.

2021 Big West Conference men's volleyball standings
	Conf.				Overall
Team	W		L	PCT	W		L	PCT
No. 1 Hawaii ‍†‍‍^{y}	10	–	0	1.000	17	–	1	.944
No. 3 UC Santa Barbara ‍‍‡‍^{y}	7	–	3	.700	16	–	5	.762
No. 7 Long Beach State ‍‍‍	6	–	4	.600	7	–	5	.583
No. 14 UC San Diego ‍‍‍	3	–	7	.300	5	–	13	.278
Cal State Northridge ‍‍‍	2	–	8	.200	2	–	9	.182
UC Irvine ‍‍‍	2	–	8	.200	2	–	14	.125
† – Conference champion ‡ – Big West tournament champion y – Invited to the NCAA tournament Rankings from AVCA

== Roster ==
2021 Hawaii Rainbow Warriors roster
Defensive Specialist/Libero: 3 Logan Sharp - Freshman; 4 Brett Sheward - (redshirt) Freshman; 5 'Eleu Choy - Freshman; 6 Gage Worsley - Junior; 9 Devon Johnson - (redshirt) Freshman; Middle blockers: 7 Cole Hogland - (redshirt) Freshman; 13 Max Rosenfeld - Sophomore; 14 Alaka'i Todd - (redshirt) Freshman; 15 Patrick Gasman - Senior; 21 Guilherme Voss - Freshman	Outside hitters: 1 Chaz Galloway - Freshman; 8 Makua Marumoto - Freshman; 9 Devon Johnson - (redshirt) Freshman; 16 Filip Humler - Sophomore; 23 Spyros Chakas - Freshman; 24 Colton Cowell - Senior; 25 Kana'i Akana - Sophomore	Opposite hitters: 11 Dimitrios Mouchlias - Freshman; 14 Alka'i Todd - (redshirt) Freshman; 15 Patrick Gasman - Senior; 19 Rado Parapunov - Senior; Setters: 2 Jack Walmer - Freshman; 4 Brett Sheward - (redshirt) Freshman; 10 Jakob Thelle - Sophomore; 12 Austin Buchanan - Freshman; 20 Jackson Van Eekeren - Junior

== Schedule ==
TV/Internet Streaming information:

All home games were televised on Spectrum Sports. All road games were also streamed on ESPN3 or Big West TV. The NCAA Tournament was streamed on B1G+ (opening round, quarterfinals), NCAA.com (semifinals), and the Championship was televised nationally on ESPNU.

Date Time	Opponent	Rank^{(Tournament Seed)}	Arena City (Tournament)	Television	Score	Attendance	Record (Big West Record)
2/21; 2 p.m.	@ #8 UC Irvine*	#2	Bren Events Center; Irvine, CA	ESPN3	W 3–1 (22–25, 25–16, 25–13, 25–17)	1	1–0 (1–0)
2/22; 5 p.m.	@ #8 UC Irvine*	#2	Bren Events Center; Irvine, CA	ESPN3	W 3–0 (25–14, 25–13, 28–26)	1	2–0 (2–0)
2/24; 5 p.m.	@ #9 UC San Diego*	#2	RIMAC; San Diego, CA	ESPN3	W 3–0 (25–20, 25–23, 25–18)	75	3–0 (3–0)
2/25; 7 p.m.	@ #9 UC San Diego*	#2	RIMAC; San Diego, CA	ESPN3	W 3–0 (25–20, 25–19, 25–23)	75	4–0 (4–0)
3/11; 2 p.m.	@ #3 UC Santa Barbara*	#1	Robertson Gymnasium; Santa Barbara, CA	Big West TV	W 3–1 (16–25, 25–20, 25–20, 25–20)	1	5–0 (5–0)
3/12; 2 p.m.	@ #3 UC Santa Barbara*	#1	Robertson Gymnasium; Santa Barbara, CA	Big West TV	W 3–0 (25–18, 25–21, 25–20)	1	6–0 (6–0)
3/13; 2 p.m.	@ #3 UC Santa Barbara	#1	Robertson Gymnasium; Santa Barbara, CA	Big West TV	W 3–0 (25–22, 25–19, 26–24)	1	7–0
3/26; 7 p.m.	#12 UC San Diego	#1	Stan Sheriff Center; Honolulu, HI	SPEC	W 3–1 (25–21, 23–25, 25–21, 25–15)	0	8–0
3/27; 7 p.m.	#12 UC San Diego	#1	Stan Sheriff Center; Honolulu, HI	SPEC	W 3–0 (25–15, 25–19, 25–21)	0	9–0
4/2; 7 p.m.	#7 Long Beach State*	#1	Stan Sheriff Center; Honolulu, HI	SPEC	W 3–1 (23–25, 25–14, 25–13, 26–24)	0	10–0 (7–0)
4/3; 7 p.m.	#7 Long Beach State*	#1	Stan Sheriff Center; Honolulu, HI	SPEC	W 3–2 (24–26, 32–30, 25–17, 20–25, 15–8)	0	11–0 (8–0)
4/9; 1 p.m.	@ CSUN*	#1	Matadome; Northridge, CA	Big West TV	W 3–1 (25–17, 25–20, 23–25, 25–19)	0	12–0 (9–0)
4/10; 1 p.m.	@ CSUN*	#1	Matadome; Northridge, CA	Big West TV	W 3–0 (25–20, 25–20, 25–21)	0	13–0 (10–0)
4/16; 7 p.m.	UC Irvine	#1	Stan Sheriff Center; Honolulu, HI	SPEC	W 3–2 (25–22, 25–23, 23–25, 24–26, 15–13)	0	14–0
4/17; 7 p.m.	UC Irvine	#1	Stan Sheriff Center; Honolulu, HI	SPEC	W 3–0 (25–17, 25–18, 25–13)	0	15–0
4/23; 7 p.m.	#14 ^{(4)} UC San Diego	#1 ^{(1)}	Stan Sheriff Center; Honolulu, HI (Big West Semifinal)	SPEC	L 2–3 (25–22, 23–25, 25–16, 23–25, 16–18)	0	15–1
5/6; 11 a.m.	#3 UC Santa Barbara	#1 ^{(1)}	Covelli Center; Columbus, OH (NCAA Semifinal)	NCAA.com	W 3–0 (25–21, 25–18, 25–23)	223	16–1
5/8; 2 p.m.	#2 ^{(2)} BYU	#1 ^{(1)}	Covelli Center; Columbus, OH (NCAA Championship)	ESPNU	W 3–0 (25–21, 25–19, 25–16)	345	17–1

*-Indicates conference match.
Times listed are Hawaii Time Zone.

== Announcers for televised games ==
- UC Irvine: Rob Espero & Charlie Brande
- UC Irvine: Rob Espero & Charlie Brande
- UC San Diego: Miles Himmel & Ricci Luyties
- UC San Diego: Miles Himmel & Ricci Luyties
- UC Santa Barbara: No commentary
- UC Santa Barbara: No commentary
- UC Santa Barbara: No commentary
- UC San Diego: Kanoa Leahey & Lisa Strand
- UC San Diego: Kanoa Leahey & Lisa Strand
- Long Beach State: Kanoa Leahey & Lisa Strand
- Long Beach State: Kanoa Leahey & Lisa Strand
- CSUN: Darren Preston
- CSUN: Darren Preston
- UC Irvine: Kanoa Leahey & Lisa Strand
- UC Irvine: Kanoa Leahey & Lisa Strand
- UC San Diego: Kanoa Leahey & Lisa Strand
- UC Santa Barbara: Paul Sunderland & Kevin Barnett
- BYU: Paul Sunderland & Kevin Barnett

== Rankings ==
Ranking movements Legend: ██ Increase in ranking ██ Decrease in ranking т = Tied with team above or below
	Week															
Poll	Pre	1	2	3	4	5	6	7	8	9	10	11	12	13	14	Final
AVCA Coaches	2	2	2	2	2	2	1	1	1	1	1	1	1	1	1	1
Off the Block Media	^	2	2	1	1т	1	1	1	1	1	1	1	1	^	^	1

^The Media did not release a Pre-season, Week 13, or Week 14 poll.
