= Oleksandr Shadchyn =

Ukrainian volleyball player

Personal information
- Born: 16 April 1969 (age 57); Kremenchuk, Ukraine
- Height: 203 cm (6 ft 8 in)

Volleyball information
- Position: Middle blocker
- Number: 3 (Soviet Union)

National team
1989–1991; 1992; 1993–1998	Soviet Union; CIS; Ukraine
Honours
Men's volleyball
Representing Soviet Union
World Championship
Bronze medal – third place	1990 Brazil	Team
FIVB World Cup
Gold medal – first place	1991 Japan
Bronze medal – third place	1989 Japan
Goodwill Games
Silver medal – second place	1990 Seattle
European Championship
Gold medal – first place	1991 Germany

Oleksandr Shadchyn (born 16 April 1969) is a Ukrainian former volleyball player. He competed in the men's tournament at the 1992 Summer Olympics in Barcelona, Spain with the Unified Team. Previously, he helped the Soviet Union win the bronze medal at the 1990 FIVB World Championship in Brazil and the gold medal at the 1991 FIVB World Cup in Japan.
