= Uvaldo Acosta =

American volleyball player (1965–1998)

Personal information
- Born: May 16, 1965 El Paso, Texas, U.S.
- Died: February 12, 1998 (aged 32) Hawaii, U.S.
- Education: George Mason University
- Height: 5 ft 11 in (1.80 m)
- Weight: 190 lb (86 kg)

Volleyball information
- Position: Outside hitter
- Number: 6 (national team); 8 (George Mason University)

National team
- Years: Team
- 1990–1991: United States
Medal record
Men's volleyball
Representing United States
FIVB World Cup
Bronze medal – third place	1991 Japan

Uvaldo Acosta (May 16, 1965 – February 12, 1998) was an American volleyball player. He was part of the United States men's national volleyball team at the 1990 FIVB World Championship in Brazil. He was selected as the "best defensive player" at the 1991 FIVB World Cup in Japan, where he won a bronze medal while representing the United States.

Acosta played for George Mason University, where he was later a coach.

== Death and legacy ==
Acosta drowned in Hawaii on February 12, 1998. He was 32 years old at the time of his death. He was posthumously inducted into the Eastern Intercollegiate Volleyball Association's Hall of Fame in 2012. The Eastern Intercollegiate Volleyball Association (EIVA) Player of the Year award was renamed the Uvaldo Acosta Memorial award in his honor, and George Mason hosted the inaugural Uvaldo Acosta Invitational in 2018.
