= 2021 Pepperdine Waves men's volleyball team =

American college volleyball season

2021 Pepperdine Waves men's volleyball

NCAA Tournament, L–Quarterfinals
- Conference: Mountain Pacific Sports Federation
- Record: 13-7 (11-5 MPSF)
- Head coach: David Hunt (4th season)
- Assistant coaches: Paul Carroll (2nd season); Matthew Pollock (2nd season)
- Home arena: Firestone Fieldhouse

The 2021 Pepperdine Waves men's volleyball team represented Pepperdine University in the 2021 NCAA Division I & II men's volleyball season. The Waves, led by fourth year head coach David Junt, play their home games at Firestone Fieldhouse. The Waves are members of the MPSF and were picked to finish second in the preseason poll.

2021 Mountain Pacific Sports Federation men's volleyball standings
	Conf.				Overall
Team	W		L	PCT	W		L	PCT
No. 2 BYU ‍†‍‡‍^{y}	17	–	3	.850	20	–	4	.833
No. 6 UCLA ‍‍‍	14	–	5	.737	15	–	6	.714
No. 5 Pepperdine ‍‍‍^{y}	11	–	5	.688	13	–	7	.650
No. 9 Grand Canyon ‍‍‍	8	–	10	.444	9	–	11	.450
USC ‍‍‍	5	–	12	.294	5	–	13	.278
Concordia Irvine ‍‍‍	3	–	13	.188	3	–	14	.176
Stanford ‍‍‍	3	–	13	.188	3	–	14	.176
† – Conference champion ‡ – MPSF tournament champion y – Invited to the NCAA tournament Rankings from AVCA

== Season highlights ==
- Will be filled in as the season progresses.

== Roster ==
2021 Pepperdine Waves roster
Defensive specialist/libero: 8 Zac Norvid - Senior; 18 Trey Cole - Freshman; Middle blockers: 11 JT Martin - (redshirt) Sophomore; 17 Mason Tyler - Senior; 20 Austin Wilmot - (redshirt) Senior; 21 Mike Scott - (redshirt) Freshman; 22 Andersen Fuller - Freshman; 23 Ryan Fuller - (redshirt) Freshman; 24 JT Ardell - (redshirt) Sophomore; 26 Chris Orem - Graduate	Outside hitters: 4 Ben Weinberg - Junior; 5 Noah Dyer - (redshirt) Senior; 7 Spencer Wickens - Senior; 14 Alex Gettinger - Senior; 15 Joe Deluzio - Freshman; 19 Cole Rasic - Freshman; 25 Akin Akinwumi - (redshirt) Freshman	Opposite hitters: 1 Scott Solan - Sophomore; 10 Auden McCaw - (redshirt) Freshman; 12 Jacob Steele - (redshirt) Sophomore; 16 Eli Crane - Freshman; 17 Mason Tyler - Senior; 25 Akin Akinwumi - (redshirt) Freshman; Setters: 3 John Karlous - Sophomore; 6 Bryce Dvorak - Freshman; 10 Auden McCaw - (redshirt) Freshman

== Schedule ==
TV/Internet Streaming information:

All home games will be televised on WaveCasts. All road games will also be streamed by the schools tv or streaming service. The conference tournament will be streamed by FloVolleyball. The NCAA Tournament will be streamed on B1G+ (opening round, quarterfinals), NCAA.com (semifinals), and the Championship will be televised nationally on ESPNU.

Date time	Opponent	Rank^{(tournament seed)}	Arena city (tournament)	Television	Score	Attendance	Record (MPSF record)
1/25; 7 p.m.	#12 Concordia Irvine*	#7	Firestone Fieldhouse; Malibu, CA	WaveCasts	W 3–2 (23–25, 25–20, 18–25, 25–17, 15–5)	0	1–0 (1–0)
1/27; 7 p.m.	@ #12 Concordia Irvine*	#7	CU Arena; Irvine, CA	Eagle TV on Stretch Internet	W 3–0 (25–22, 25–21, 25–19)	0	2–0 (2–0)
2/12; 6 p.m.	@ #1 BYU*	#7	Smith Fieldhouse; Provo, UT	BYUtv	L 0–3 (6–25, 23–25, 26–28)	150	2–1 (2–1)
2/13; 6 p.m.	@ #1 BYU*	#7	Smith Fieldhouse; Provo, UT	BYUtv	L 1–3 (25–23, 26–28, 23–25, 24–26)	150	2–2 (2–2)
2/18; 9 a.m.	@ Stanford*	#6	Maples Pavilion; Palo Alto, CA	P12+ STAN	W 3–01 (25–21, 27–25, 25–17)	0	3–2 (3–2)
2/20; 3 p.m.	@ Stanford*	#6	Maples Pavilion; Palo Alto, CA	P12+ STAN	W 3–1 (25–22, 20–25, 25–18, 28–26)	0	4–2 (4–2)
2/24; 5 p.m.	@ USC*	#5	Galen Center; Los Angeles, CA	P12+ USC	W 3–0 (25–23, 25–17, 30–28)	0	5–2 (5–2)
2/27; 12 p.m.	USC*	#5	Firestone Fieldhouse; Malibu, CA	WaveCasts	W 3–0 (25–19, 25–17, 25–21)	0	6–2 (6–2)
3/3; 6 p.m.	Stanford*	#3	Firestone Fieldhouse; Malibu, CA	WaveCasts	W 3–0 (25–15, 25–21, 25–21)	0	7–2 (7–2)
3/11; 5 p.m.	@ #8 UCLA*	#4	Pauley Pavilion; Los Angeles, CA	P12+ UCLA	L 2–3 (25–23, 12–25, 25–22, 14–25, 10–15)	0	7–3 (7–3)
3/13; 5 p.m.	#8 UCLA*	#4	Firestone Fieldhouse; Malibu, CA	WaveCasts	W 3–1 (24–26, 25–21, 25–23, 25–22)	0	8–3 (8–3)
3/19; 1 p.m.	#2 BYU*	#4	Firestone Fieldhouse; Malibu, CA	WaveCasts	L 1–3 (25–20, 17–25, 21–25, 17–25)	0	8–4 (8–4)
3/20; 1 p.m.	#2 BYU*	#4	Firestone Fieldhouse; Malibu, CA	WaveCasts	L 0–3 (21–25, 14–25, 20–25)	0	8–5 (8–5)
3/26; 3 p.m.	#9 Grand Canyon*	#5	Firestone Fieldhouse; Malibu, CA	WaveCasts	W 3–0 (25–22, 25–20, 25–21)	0	9–5 (9–5)
3/27; 5 p.m.	#9 Grand Canyon*	#5	Firestone Fieldhouse; Malibu, CA	WaveCasts	W 3–2 (25–20, 21–25, 30–28, 21–25, 15–4)	0	10–5 (10–5)
3/28; 5 p.m.	#9 Grand Canyon*	#5	Firestone Fieldhouse; Malibu, CA	WaveCasts	W 3–0 (29–27, 26–24, 25–18)	0	11–5 (11–5)
3/31; 3 p.m.	#4 UCLA*	#5	Firestone Fieldhouse; Malibu, CA	WaveCasts	Cancelled- COVID-19 Protocols		
4/16; 6 p.m.	@ Stanford*	#5	Maples Pavilion; Palo Alto, CA	P12+ STAN	Cancelled- COVID-19 Protocols		
4/17; 4 p.m.	@ Stanford*	#5	Maples Pavilion; Palo Alto, CA	P12+ STAN	Cancelled- COVID-19 Protocols		
4/23; 4 p.m.	^{(6)} Stanford	#5^{(3)}	Smith Fieldhouse; Provo, UT (MPSF Quarterfinal)	FloVolleyball	W 3–1 (25–22, 21–25, 25–22, 25–19)	N/A	12–5
4/24; 3 p.m.	#6 ^{(2)} UCLA	#5^{(3)}	Smith Fieldhouse; Provo, UT (MPSF Semifinal)	FloVolleyball	W 3–0 (25–20, 25–23, 26–24)	700	13–5
4/24; 6 p.m.	#2 ^{(1)} BYU	#5^{(3)}	Smith Fieldhouse; Provo, UT (MPSF Championship)	FloVolleyball	L 0–3 (23–25, 15–25, 19–25)	750	13–6
5/6; 6 p.m.	#3 UC Santa Barbara	#5	Covelli Center; Columbus, OH (NCAA Quarterfinal)	B1G+	L 1–3 (23–25, 22–25, 25–22, 26–28)	108	13–7

*-Indicates conference match.
Times listed are Pacific Time Zone.

== Announcers for televised games ==
- Concordia: Al Epstein
- Concordia: Viola Patience O'Neal
- BYU: Jarom Jordan & Steve Vail
- BYU: Jarom Jordan & Steve Vail
- Stanford: Tim Swartz
- Stanford: Tim Swartz
- USC: Mark Beltran & Paul Duchesne
- USC: Al Epstein
- Stanford: Al Epstein
- UCLA: Denny Cline
- UCLA: Al Epstein
- BYU: Al Epstein
- BYU: Al Epstein
- Grand Canyon: Al Epstein
- Grand Canyon: Al Epstein
- Grand Canyon: Al Epstein
- Stanford: Jarom Jordan & Steve Vail
- UCLA: Jarom Jordan & Steve Vail
- BYU: Jarom Jordan & Steve Vail
- UC Santa Barbara: Luke Wood Maloney & Ben Spurlock
