= Tyler Mitchem =

American volleyball player (born 1998)

Personal information
- Full name: Tyler Joseph Mitchem
- Nationality: American
- Born: May 24, 1998 (age 28)
- Home town: Bolingbrook, Illinois, U.S.
- Education: Lewis
- Height: 7 ft 0 in (2.13 m)
- Weight: 240 lb (110 kg)
- Spike: 147 in (373 cm)
- Block: 140 in (355 cm)

Volleyball information
- Position: Middle Blocker
- Current club: (France) Le Plessis-Robinson Volley-ball (fr)
- Number: 27 (national team)

Career
- Years: Team
- 2017–2022: (United States) Lewis Flyers
- 2022–: (France) Le Plessis-Robinson Volley-ball (fr)

National team
- Years: Team
- 2021–: United States
Medal record
FIVB Nations League
Silver medal – second place	2022 Bologna
Pan-American Cup
Bronze medal – third place	2021 Santo Domingo

Tyler Joseph Mitchem (born May 24, 1998) is an American indoor volleyball player plays as a middle blocker on the United States men's national volleyball team. On club level, he plays for Le Plessis-Robinson Volley-ball in France.

== Personal life ==
Mitchem is a native of Bolingbrook, Illinois and is a high school graduate of Bolingbrook High School. His mother, Jackie, played basketball at Lewis, and his father James played basketball at DePaul, helping the team reach the 1979 NCAA Final Four.

== Career ==
=== Lewis ===
Mitchem played for the Lewis Flyers volleyball team from 2017–2022. After redshirting his freshman season in 2017, he played for 4 seasons over 5 years, as he used his extra year of eligibility granted by the NCAA during the COVID-19 pandemic (the 2020 season was cancelled due to the pandemic). He was named an AVCA All-American second team in 2019 and was a first team selection his 3 final seasons. In 2019, Mitchem led the NCAA in hitting percentage with a .504% and helped Lewis to the 2019 Division I/II NCAA Final Four, where they lost to Hawai'i in the semifinals.

In 2021, he helped Lewis to the 2021 Division I/II NCAA Final Four and was named to the All-Tournament Team, after recording 10 kills and 6 blocks in Lewis' semifinal loss versus BYU.

In 2022, he tallied a .447 Hitting %, and had 122 Blocks, averaging 1.341 blocks per set. He also garnered multiple other awards in 2022 from Off The Block, including the National Blocker of the Year, the Dain Blanton Diversity Award winner, the Division II National Player of the Year and the Ryan Millar award. Mitchem's 1.34 blocks per set was 3rd in the nation between Division I/II players.

=== Professional clubs ===
- (France) Le Plessis-Robinson Volley-ball (fr) (2022–)

On June 4, 2022, Mitchem announced on his Instagram account that he would play his first professional season in France for the 2022–2023 season, with Le Plessis-Robinson club.

=== National team ===
Mitchem made his U.S. national team debut in 2021. He participated in the 2021 Men's Pan-American Volleyball Cup and won a bronze medal with the team.

In the 2022 FIVB Nations League, Mitchem played in matches versus the Netherlands, Brazil, and Iran, recording 16 total points throughout all matches. He was named to the final roster and though did not see any playing team in the finals week matches, won a silver medal with the team.

== Honors and awards ==
=== International ===
- 2022 Nations League – Silver medal, with U.S. national team
- 2021 Pan-American Cup – Bronze medal, with U.S. national team

== See also ==
- 2021 Lewis Flyers men's volleyball team
- 2022 Lewis Flyers men's volleyball team
