= FIVB World Cup results =

FIVB World Cup results may refer to

- FIVB Volleyball Men's World Cup
- FIVB Volleyball Women's World Cup
