= Yuri Koroviansky =

Ukrainian volleyball player

Personal information
- Full name: Yuri Anatolyevich Koroviansky
- Nationality: French / Ukrainian
- Born: 30 September 1967 Horlivka
- Died: 8 March 2017 (aged 49)
- Height: 1.94 m (6 ft 4 in)
Medal record
Men's volleyball
Representing Soviet Union
World Cup
Gold medal – first place	1991 Japan	Team
World League
Bronze medal – third place	1991 Italy	Team
European Championships
Gold medal – first place	1991 Germany	Team
Representing Ukraine

Yuri Koroviansky (Russian: Юрий Коровянский, French: Yuriy Korovyanskyy, 30 September 1967 – 8 March 2017) was a Ukrainian volleyball player who competed for the Unified Team in the 1992 Summer Olympics. He was 194 cm tall. He was a French citizen from 2011 until his death.

== Biography ==
Koroviansky was born at Horlivka and debuted in 1984 for VC Shakhtar Donetsk. He finished seventh with the Unified Team in the 1992 Olympic tournament. With the Soviet (or Unified Team) national team he won a World Cup in 1991, the European Championships of 1991 and a bronze medal in the 1991 World League.

Koroviansky played in Greece from 1993 with AO Orestiada (Runner-up of the Greek championship and finished 4th in the CEV Cup final four). After one year in Greece, he signed in Cyprus for Paphiakos Paphos. He subsequently played in France with Tourcoing, Tours, Paris (won the French championship in 1997), Strasbourg, Halluin and he concluded his playing career in 2006 with Cambrai (in French 2nd league).

He was the head coach of youth team in Cambrai.

== Honours ==
=== Club ===
- 1 Soviet Championship (1992)
- 1 Ukrainian Championship (1993)
- 1 French Championship (1998)

=== National team ===
- 1 World Cup (1991)
- 1 European Championship (1991)
