= Volleyball World Cup Detailed Palmares =

Volleyball World Cup Detailed Palmares may refer to:

- FIVB Volleyball Men's World Cup
- FIVB Volleyball Women's World Cup
