= FIVB World Cup =

FIVB World Cup may refer to:

- FIVB Volleyball Men's World Cup
- FIVB Volleyball Women's World Cup
