= Konstantin Ushakov =

Russian volleyball player (born 1970)

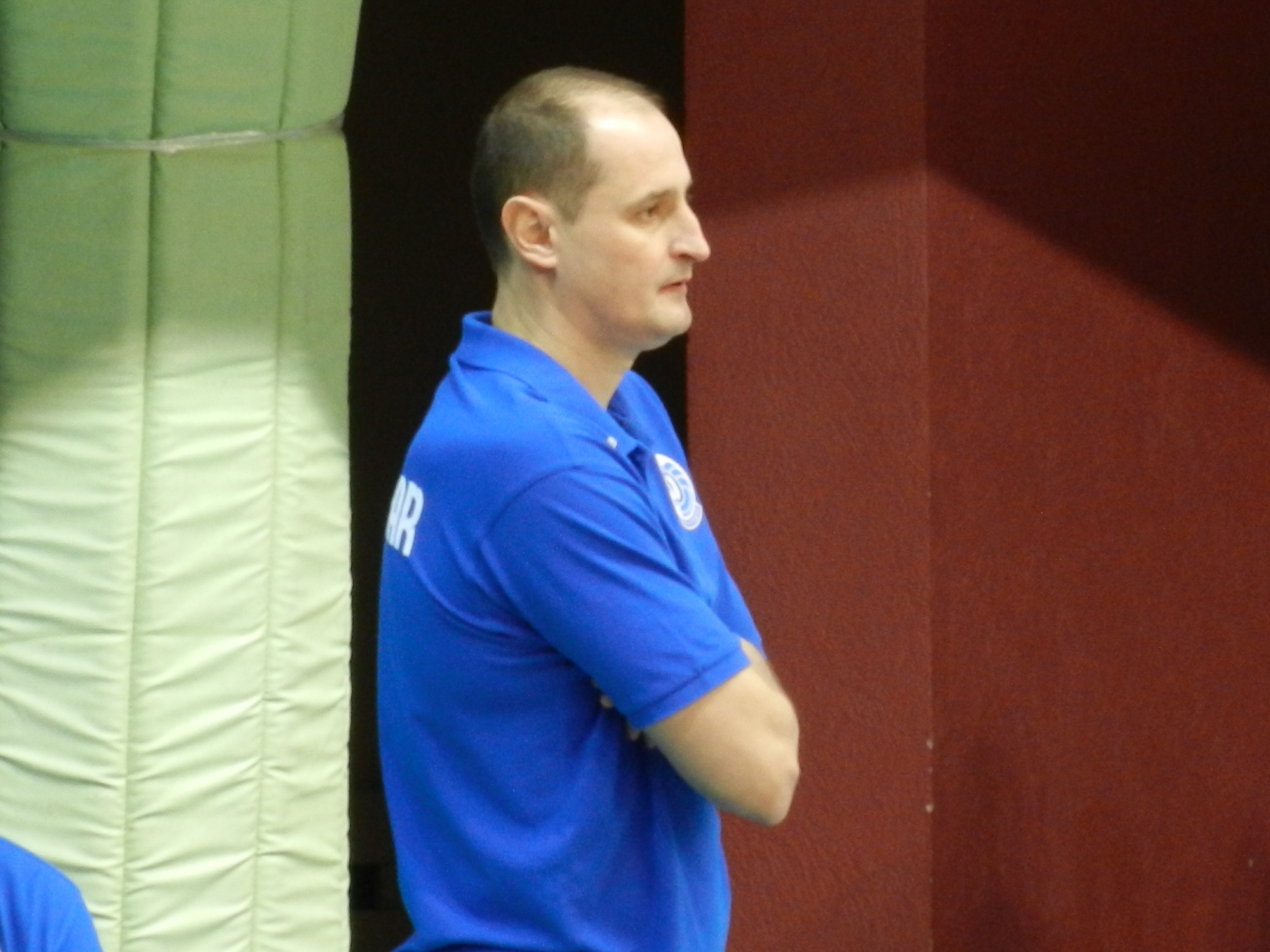

Personal information
- Full name: Konstantin Anatolyevich Ushakov
- Born: 24 March 1970 (age 56); Omsk, Soviet Union
- Height: 1.98 m (6 ft 6 in)
- Weight: 77 kg (170 lb)
- Spike: 343 cm (135 in)
- Block: 332 cm (131 in)

Coaching information
Previous teams coached
Years	Teams
2014–2021; 2017; 2021–2024	Dinamo Krasnodar; Russia; Dinamo Moscow

Volleyball information
- Position: Setter

Career
Years	Teams
1988–1992; 1992–1999; 1999–2000; 2000–2001; 2001–2003; 2003–2005; 2005–2007; 2007–2008; 2008–2010; 2010–2011; 2011–2013	Radiotechnik Riga; CSKA Moscow; Dynamo Belgorod; Itas Gruppo Diatec Trentino; SSK Ankara; Dinamo Moscow; Fakel Novy Urengoy; Dinamo-Yantar Kaliningrad; Ural Ufa; Dinamo Krasnodar; Kuzbass Kemerovo

National team
1991; 1992; 1993–2012	Soviet Union; CIS; Russia
Honours
Men's volleyball
Representing Soviet Union
World Cup
Gold medal – first place	1991 Japan	Team
World League
Bronze medal – third place	1991 Milan	Team
European Championship
Gold medal – first place	1991 Germany	Team
Representing Russia
Olympic Games
Silver medal – second place	2000 Sydney	Team
Bronze medal – third place	2004 Athens	Team
World Championship
Silver medal – second place	2002 Argentina	Team
World Cup
Gold medal – first place	1999 Japan	Team
World League
Gold medal – first place	2002 Belo Horizonte	Team
Silver medal – second place	1993 São Paulo	Team
Silver medal – second place	1998 Milan	Team
Silver medal – second place	2000 Rotterdam	Team
Bronze medal – third place	1997 Moscow	Team
Bronze medal – third place	2001 Katowice	Team
Bronze medal – third place	2006 Moscow	Team
European Championship
Silver medal – second place	1999 Austria	Team
Silver medal – second place	2005 Italy/Serbia and Montenegro	Team
Bronze medal – third place	1993 Finland	Team
Bronze medal – third place	2003 Germany	Team

Konstantin Anatolyevich Ushakov (Russian: Константин Анатольевич Ушаков; born 24 March 1970) is a Russian coach and retired volleyball player, who was a member of the Russian men's national volleyball team that won the silver medal at the 2000 Summer Olympics in Sydney. Playing as a setter, he won the 2002 Volleyball World League and the 1999 FIVB World Cup with Russia. A four-time Olympian, he also competed at the 2004 Summer Olympics in Athens, claiming the bronze medal.

== Coaching ==
Working as a head coach, Ushakov guided the Russian club Dinamo Krasnodar to the silver medal in the 2015 FIVB Club World Championship.
