= Gabriel García Fernández =

Puerto Rican volleyball player (born 1999)

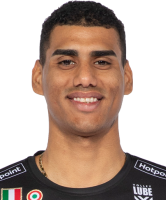

Personal information
- Full name: Gabriel Jose García Fernández
- Nickname: Gabi
- Born: January 8, 1999 (age 27); San Juan, Puerto Rico
- Height: 2.00 m (6 ft 7 in)
- Education: Brigham Young University

Volleyball information
- Position: Opposite
- Current club: Trentino Volley

Career
Years	Teams
2018–2021; 2021–2023; 2023–2024; 2024–	BYU Cougars; Cucine Lube Civitanova; Pallavolo Padova; Trentino Volley

National team
2019–2021; 2024–	Puerto Rico; United States
Honours
Men's volleyball
Representing Puerto Rico
NORCECA Championship
Gold medal – first place	2021 Durango City

Gabriel Jose García Fernández (born January 8, 1999) is a Puerto Rican volleyball player who plays as an opposite spiker for Trentino Volley and the U.S. national team.

He used to represent the Puerto Rico national team in the past. In 2022, the FIVB allowed him to change his sports nationality, and in 2024 Garcia became fully eligible to compete for the United States in international volleyball.

== Honours ==
=== College ===
- Domestic
  - 2021 NCAA National Championship, with BYU Cougars

=== Club ===
- FIVB Club World Championship
  - Betim 2021 – with Cucine Lube Civitanova
- Domestic
  - 2021–22 Italian Championship, with Cucine Lube Civitanova

=== Individual awards ===
- 2021: NCAA National Championship – All-tournament team
