= Dmitry Fomin =

Russian volleyball player

Personal information
- Nationality: Russian
- Born: 21 January 1968 (age 58); Sevastopol, Ukraine
- Height: 200 cm (6 ft 7 in)
- Weight: 94 kg (207 lb)

Volleyball information
- Position: Opposite
- Number: 8 (national team)

Career
Years	Teams
1989–1992; 1992–1996; 1996–2002; 2002–2003; 2003–2006	CSKA Moskva; Porto Ravenna Volley; Volley Treviso; Toray Arrows; Zenit Kazan

National team
1989–1991; 1992; 1993–1998	Soviet Union; CIS; Russia
Honours
Men's volleyball
Representing Soviet Union
World Championship
Bronze medal – third place	1990 Brazil	Team
FIVB World Cup
Gold medal – first place	1991 Japan
Goodwill Games
Silver medal – second place	1990 Seattle
European Championship
Gold medal – first place	1991 Germany
Men's volleyball
Representing Russia
European Championship
Bronze medal – third place	1993 Finland

Dmitry Fomin or Dmitri Fomine (Russian: Дмитрий Фомин; born 21 January 1968) is a Russian former volleyball player. He was part of the Soviet Union men's national volleyball team that won the bronze medal at the 1990 FIVB World Championship in Brazil. He was part of the Unified Team at the 1992 Summer Olympics in Barcelona and the Russian team at the 1996 Summer Olympics in Atlanta.

While representing the Soviet Union, Fomin won a gold medal and the MVP award at the 1991 FIVB World Cup in Japan. Fomin also competed at the 1994 FIVB World Championship in Greece while representing Russia. He then won the MVP award at the 1995 FIVB World League in Brazil while playing with Russia.
