= Sergey Gorbunov =

Russian volleyball player (1970–2001)

Personal information
- Full name: Sergey Vladimirovich Gorbunov
- Born: 10 July 1970 Nizhny Novgorod, Russian SFSR
- Died: 20 December 2001 (aged 31) Moscow, Russia
- Height: 2.01 m (6 ft 7 in)

Volleyball information
- Position: Outside hitter
- Number: 13 (national team)

Career
- Years: Team
- 1986–1994: (Russia) Dinamo Moscow
- 1994–1995: (Turkey) Turkish League
- 1995–1996: (Italy) SICC Rovigo
- 1996–1997: (Italy) Wuber Schio
- 1997–1998: (France) AS Cannes
- 1998–1999: (Italy) Videx Grottazzolina

National team
- Years: Team
- 1991 1992: Soviet Union; CIS
Honours
Men's volleyball
Representing Soviet Union
World Cup
Gold medal – first place	1991 Japan	Team
World League
Bronze medal – third place	1991 Milan	Team
European Championship
Gold medal – first place	1991 Germany	Team

Sergey Vladimirovich Gorbunov (Russian: Сергей Владимирович Горбунов; 10 July 1970 – 20 December 2001) was a Russian volleyball player. He competed in the men's tournament at the 1992 Summer Olympics in Barcelona, finishing in seventh place.

Gorbunov won a gold medal representing the Soviet Union at the 1991 World Cup in Japan. He also won a gold medal with the Soviet team at the 1991 European Championship in Germany.

== Death ==
Gorbunov died on 20 December 2001 in a Moscow hospital after experiencing a high fever for three days.
