= Penn State Nittany Lions men's volleyball =

Men's volleyball team of Penn State University

- University: Pennsylvania State University
- Head coach: Mark Pavlik (24th season)
- Conference: EIVA
- Location: University Park, Pennsylvania, US
- Home arena: Rec Hall (capacity: 7,200)
- Nickname: Nittany Lions
- Colors: Blue and white

NCAA tournament champion
- 1994, 2008

NCAA tournament runner-up
- 1982, 1995, 2006, 2010

NCAA tournament semifinal
- 1981, 1982, 1983, 1986, 1987, 1989, 1991, 1992, 1993, 1994, 1995, 1996, 1997, 1999, 2000, 2001, 2002, 2003, 2004, 2005, 2006, 2007, 2008, 2009, 2010, 2011, 2012, 2013, 2014, 2015, 2023

NCAA tournament appearance
- 1981, 1982, 1983, 1986, 1987, 1989, 1991, 1992, 1993, 1994, 1995, 1996, 1997, 1999, 2000, 2001, 2002, 2003, 2004, 2005, 2006, 2007, 2008, 2009, 2010, 2011, 2012, 2013, 2014, 2015, 2017, 2021, 2023, 2024, 2025

Conference tournament champion
- 1981, 1982, 1983, 1986, 1987, 1989, 1991, 1992, 1993, 1994, 1995, 1996, 1997, 1998, 1999, 2000, 2001, 2002, 2003, 2004, 2005, 2006, 2007, 2008, 2009, 2010, 2011, 2012, 2013, 2014, 2015, 2017, 2021, 2023, 2024, 2025

Conference regular season champion
- 1981, 1982, 1983, 1986, 1987, 1989, 1991, 1992, 1993, 1994, 1995, 1996, 1997, 1999, 2000, 2001, 2002, 2003, 2004, 2005, 2006, 2007, 2008, 2009, 2010, 2011, 2012, 2013, 2014, 2015, 2016, 2017, 2021, 2022, 2023, 2024

The Penn State Nittany Lions men's volleyball program has had a long tradition at Penn State University. Founded by Tom Tait, Tait coached the team from 1976 to 1989, and was named a USA Volleyball All-Time great coach in 2007.

Mark Pavlik has been the head coach since 1995 after serving as an assistant coach for five years. He has led the team to every EIVA conference championship since 1995 with the exception of 1998. Under his guidance, Penn State finished as NCAA runners-up in 1995 and 2006 before winning it all in 2008. He also led the team to an NCAA record of 15 straight (1999–2013) NCAA Final Four appearances. Pavlik was awarded his first ever AVCA National Coach of the Year in 2008.

== History ==
=== 1982 ===
Penn State made their first ever NCAA Championship match this year. Current head coach Mark Pavlik was a manager on the team. Penn State was swept by perennial powerhouse UCLA in the final at Rec Hall, led by future Olympic gold medalist and Most Outstanding Player Karch Kiraly.

=== 1994 ===
1994 was a historic year, as Penn State became the first non-California university to win the men's volleyball championship. Playing in Fort Wayne, Indiana, the Lions defeated defending NCAA champion UCLA in a five-set match. After falling behind 2 sets to 1, UCLA looked to have the championship in their hands after being up 11–4 in the fourth set, needing to only get to 15. However, the Lions mounted a stunning comeback and went on an 11–1 run to take set four 15–12 and set five with the same score to win the national championship. It was then-head coach Tom Peterson's last year.

=== 1997 ===
Penn State got back to the final four, losing to UCLA in a five-set match in the semifinals. Senior Ivan Contreras was named the AVCA National Player of the Year, the first ever east coast player to win the award.

=== 2006 ===
After eight straight years of making the NCAA final four and losing in the semifinals, Penn State finally broke through. They defeated top ranked and top-seeded UC Irvine in the semifinals at Rec Hall in five games. Despite the successful semifinal result, Penn State lost to UCLA in the national championship.

=== 2008 ===
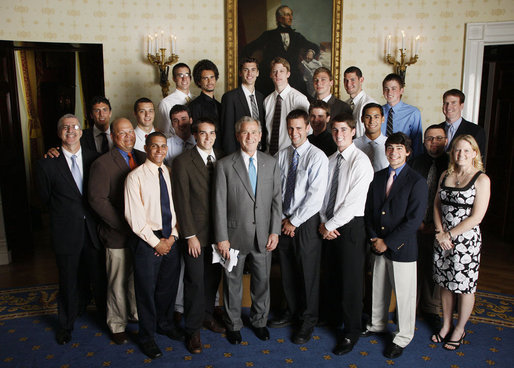
The Nittany Lions team, coaches, and staff are honored at the White House by President of the United States George W. Bush in June 2008 for winning the 2008 national championship.

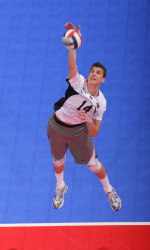
Matt Anderson (above) was the 2008 AVCA Co-National Player of the Year, EIVA Player of the Year, and the NCAA championship tournament most valuable player.

In the early 2008 season, Penn State swept UCLA for the first time since 1991, and also defeated west coast powers Hawai'i, Cal Baptist and Long Beach State. Penn State only lost one match in the regular season to George Mason, but got revenge on the Patriots in the EIVA tournament finals, securing their bid for their NCAA record tenth consecutive final four appearance. Penn State improved to 55–3 all time in the EIVA championship.

Penn State was the top seed in the final four, the first time in the history of the men's volleyball tournament that a non-west coast university was the top seed. The final four was held in Irvine, California at the Bren Events Center from May 1–3. After defeating Ohio State in the semifinals, Penn State met Pepperdine in the final. After dropping the first set, Penn State went on to win the next three to defeat the Waves in four games. Matt Anderson, the AVCA Co-National Player of the Year, was named the tournament's Most Outstanding Player. Four other Penn State players were named All Americans.

Pepperdine head coach Marv Dunphy said earlier in the NCAA tournament that the 2008 Penn State men's volleyball team was the best men's volleyball team to ever come out of the east or midwest.

=== 2013 ===
In 2013, the Nittany Lions ended their season with a defeat by the BYU Cougars 0–3 (21–25, 16–25, 22–25) in the second semifinal of the NCAA championships on May 2, 2013, at UCLA's Pauley Pavilion.

=== All-Americans ===
The Penn State men's volleyball program has seen 98 AVCA All American honors.

Year	AVCA All-Americans
1971	Trevor Zahniser (HM)
1976	Tom Hahn (1st), John Phillips (1st), Dave Dicker (HM), Larry Wile (HM)
1981	Ahmet Ozcam (1st)
1982	Steve Hunkins (1st), Jeff Johnson (1st), Mike Guyon (HM), Chuck Kegerreis (HM), Bruce Van Horn (HM)
1983	Bruce Van Horn (HM)
1985	Javier Gaspar (HM), Bob Palka (HM)
1986	Chris Chase (1st), Javier Gaspar (2nd), Stew Russell (HM)
1987	Chris Chase (1st), Javier Gaspar (1st)
1988	Chris Chase (1st), Javier Gaspar (1st), Dave Bittner (HM), Robert Pierce (HM)
1989	Chris Chase (3rd), Robert Pierce (3rd), Guillo Silva (HM)
1990	Guillo Silva (3rd)
1991	Jorge Perez (2nd), Scott Miller (3rd), Charlie Bertran (HM)
1992	David Muir (2nd), Ramon Hernandez (3rd), Jim Schall (HM)
1993	Ramon Hernandez (3rd)
1994	Ramon Hernandez (1st), Ivan Contreras (2nd), Carlos Ortiz (HM), Ed Josefoski (HM)
1995	Ivan Contreras (1st), Carlos Ortiz (1st), Ed Josefoski (2nd), Kevin Hourican (HM)
1996	Ivan Contreras (1st), Kevin Hourican (2nd)
1997	Ivan Contreras (1st), Jason Kepner (2nd)
2000	Jose Quinones (3rd)
2001	Jose Quinones (1st), Carlos Guerra (HM), Zeljko Koljesar (HM)
2002	Jose Quinones (1st), Zeljko Koljesar (2nd), Ricky Mattei (2nd), Zach Slenker (2nd)
2003	Carlos Guerra (2nd), Keith Kowal (2nd)
2004	Keith Kowal (1st), Ricky Mattei (2nd)
2005	Nate Meerstein (1st), Keith Kowal (2nd), Matt Proper (2nd)
2006	Matt Proper (2nd)
2007	Matt Anderson (2nd)
2008	Matt Anderson (1st), Max Holt (1st), Dennis Del Valle (2nd), Max Lipsitz (2nd), Luke Murray (2nd)
2009	Max Holt (1st), Max Lipsitz (1st), Will Price (1st), Dennis Del Valle (2nd), Edgardo Goas (2nd)
2010	Max Lipsitz (1st), Dennis Del Valle (2nd)
2011	Joe Sunder (1st), Dennis Del Valle (2nd), Edgardo Goas (2nd)
2012	Joe Sunder (2nd)
2014	Aaron Russell (1st), Nick Goodell (HM)
2015	Aaron Russell (1st)
2016	Chris Nugent (HM)
2017	Chris Nugent (2nd), Calvin Mende (HM)
2018	Matthew McLaren (HM), Calvin Mende (HM)
2020	Brett Wildman (HM)
2021	Cal Fisher (2nd) Cole Bogner (2nd) Brett Wildman (2nd)
2022	Cal Fisher (2nd) Cole Bogner (2nd) Brett Wildman (1st)
2023	Cole Bogner (1st), Toby Ezeonu (1st), Cal Fisher (2nd), Michal Kowal (HM), Ryan Merk (HM), Owen Rose (HM), Brett Wildman (HM)
2024	John Kerr (1st), Toby Ezeonu (2nd), Ryan Merk (2nd), Owen Rose (HM)
2025	Ryan Merk (HM)
2026	Sean Harvey (2nd), Ryan Merk (HM), Owen Rose (HM)

=== National Awards ===
Mark Pavlik has earned one National Coach of the Year award, while former head coach Tom Peterson got the accolade once as well. Two Penn State players have been named Player of the Year.

Year/Award	National Coach of the Year	National Player of the Year
1994	Tom Peterson	
1997		Ivan Contreras
2008	Mark Pavlik	Matt Anderson

=== All-time roster ===
From 1973 to 2017, the All Time Roster contains 230-plus different student-athletes, including two Jeff Johnsons. The roster below includes all lettermen, red shirts, and partial years.

Year/Number	0	1	2	3	4	5	6	7	8	9	10	11	12	13	14	15	16	17	18	19	20	21	22	23	24
1973–1974	–	Roger McGinnis	Gary Strawbridge	Don Tobin	Ray Lewis	Stu Cohen	Jim Wittler	Dave Kissinger	Dan Harslem	–	Tom Hahn	Larry Wile	–	Keith Treece	–	–	–	–	–	–	–	–	–	–	–
1974–1975	Frank Agnew	Dave Evans	Jeff Morris	Dave Dicker	Stu Cohen	Frank Guadagnino	Jim Wittler	Dave Kissinger	–	John Phillips	Tom Hahn	Larry Wile	–	Keith Treece	–	–	–	–	–	–	–	–	–	–	–
1975–1976	Frank Agnew	Dave Evans	Jeff Morris	Dave Dicker	–	Frank Guadagnino	Carey Seavy	Jeff Seavy	–	John Phillips	Tom Hahn	Larry Wile	–	–	–	–	–	–	–	–	–	–	–	–	–
1976–1977	–	Dave Evans	Frank Agnew	Mark Glentzer	Dave Phillips	Frank Guadagnino	Carey Seavy	Jeff Seavy	David Mull	John Phillips	John Morgan	Don Uveges	Dan Dehn	Rich Emanuel	Rick Genday	Mike Casey	Tom Labutta	Jeff Shinrock	Matt Hilbert	Rob Laughner	–	–	–	–	–
1977–1978	–	Walt Cannon	Frank Agnew	–	Dave Phillips	Frank Guadagnino	Carey Seavy	Rich Emanuel	David Mull	Rick Genday	John Morgan	–	Mike Gordon	Don Uveges	–	Mike Casey	John Moritz	Scott Shreve	–	–	–	–	–	–	–
1978–1979	–	–	–	Don Uveges	Dave Phillips	Matt Schmale	Carey Seavy	Mark Pavlik	David Mull	Rick Genday	John Morgan	–	Mike Gordon	Ron Shayka	Al Syracuse	Chuck Kegerreis	John Moritz	Kirk Van Horn	–	–	–	–	–	–	–
1979–1980	–	Randy Panko	–	Mike Guyon	Ron Shayka	Ron Kelly	Bill Schooley	Ken Kraft	David Mull	Rick Genday	Jeff Johnson	–	Mike Gordon	John Moritz	Bruce Van Horn	Chuck Kegerreis	Mark Kraynik	–	–	–	–	–	–	–	–
1980–1981	–	–	Ron Carper	Mike Guyon	Ron Shayka	Mark Strohmayer	Steve Hunkins	Ken Kraft	David McMillan	Ahmet Ozcam	Jeff Johnson	–	Mike Gordon	–	Bruce Van Horn	Chuck Kegerreis	Mark Kraynik	–	–	–	–	–	–	–	–
1981–1982	–	–	–	Scott Treser	Mike Guyon	Bob Palka	Steve Hunkins	Ken Kraft	Steve Marselese	Dave McMillan	Jeff Johnson	Tony Lutz	Paul Hunczak	–	Bruce Van Horn	Chuck Kegerreis	Mark Kraynik	–	–	–	–	–	–	–	–
1982–1983	–	Steve Marselese	–	Scott Treser	Mike Guyon	Bob Palka	Steve Hunkins	Ken Kraft	John Hartranft	Duane Trumble	Jeff Johnson	Johan Jonsson	Ed Sciulli	–	–	Bruce Van Horn	Mark Kraynik	Boris Kaz	–	–	–	–	–	–	–
1983–1984	–	Blair Dodds	–	Stew Russell	Fred Gozum	Bob Palka	Steve Hunkins	Jon Penn	John Hartranft	Duane Trumble	Jose Rubayo	Ole Lachemeyer	Ed Sciulli	–	–	Jeff Johnson	Todd Stehman	Boris Kaz	–	–	–	–	–	–	–
1984–1985	–	Chip Hummer	Javier Gaspar	Bob Faux	Fred Gozum	Rich Cicero	Mike Hogan	Jon Penn	John Hartranft	Bob Palka	Jose Rubayo	David Bittner	Keith Yarros	Trevor Hale	Stew Russell	Jeff Johnson	Todd Stehman	Jim Senior	Andy Rich	–	–	–	–	–	–
1985–1986	–	–	Javier Gaspar	Bob Faux	Fred Gozum	Rich Cicero	Mike Hogan	Jon Penn	John Hartranft	Robert Pierce	Jose Rubayo	David Bittner	Keith Yarros	–	Stew Russell	Terry Van Horn	–	Chris Chase	–	–	–	–	–	–	–
1986–1987	–	–	Javier Gaspar	–	Jon Ward	Rich Cicero	Mike Hogan	John Wasiliewski	Bart Berkey	Todd Shirley	Jose Rubayo	David Bittner	Keith Yarros	–	–	Robert Pierce	Rich Zemba	Chris Chase	–	–	–	–	–	–	–
1987–1988	–	Scott Miller	Javier Gaspar	Carlos Bertran	Jon Ward	Rich Cicero	Mike Hogan	John Wasiliewski	Jorge Perez	Todd Shirley	Jose Rubayo	David Bittner	Keith Yarros	Hollis Davidson	Kevin Mosbacher	Robert Pierce	Guillo Silva	Chris Chase	–	–	–	–	–	–	–
1988–1989	–	Scott Miller	Javier Gaspar	Carlos Bertran	Winfield Evens	Jim Schall	David Yost	John Wasiliewski	Jorge Perez	Todd Shirley	Tom Gingrich	Scott Shirley	Kevin Mosbacher	–	–	Robert Pierce	Guillo Silva	Chris Chase	–	–	–	–	–	–	–
1989–1990	–	Scott Miller	Mike Schall	Carlos Bertran	Winfield Evens	Jim Schall	–	John Wasiliewski	Jorge Perez	Todd Shirley	Tom Gingrich	Larry Perry	Kevin Mosbacher	Ricky Roper	–	Tito Nunez	Guillo Silva	Jeff Johnson	–	–	–	–	–	–	–
1990–1991	–	Scott Miller	Mike Schall	Carlos Bertran	Winfield Evens	Jim Schall	Marcus Neumann	David Muir	Jorge Perez	Ramon Hernandez	Tom Gingrich	Luke Patsey	Byron Schneider	Ricky Roper	–	Tito Nunez	Aaron Zoerner	Ed Josefoski	–	–	–	–	–	–	–
1991–1992	–	Brian Heffernan	Mike Schall	–	Winfield Evens	Jim Schall	Marcus Neumann	David Muir	Mark Blum	Ramon Hernandez	Tom Gingrich	Ulf Akerstedt	Byron Schneider	Ricky Roper	Carlos Ortiz	Brian Miller	Aaron Zoerner	Ed Josefoski	–	–	–	–	–	–	–
1992–1993	–	Brian Heffernan	Mike Schall	Kristian Hahn	Adam Fernsler	Jason Kepner	Marcus Neumann	David Muir	Carlos Ortiz	Ramon Hernandez	–	Kevin Hourican	Byron Schneider	Ricky Roper	Aaron Zoerner	Brian Miller	Fred Matheis	Ed Josefoski	Jake Yanchar	Stewart Murrey	Scott Irwin	–	–	–	–
1993–1994	–	–	–	Ivan Contreras	Adam Fernsler	Jason Kepner	–	–	Carlos Ortiz	Ramon Hernandez	Jake Yanchar	Kevin Hourican	Byron Schneider	Kristian Hahn	–	Brian Miller	Fred Matheis	Ed Josefoski	–	–	Scott Irwin	–	–	–	–
1994–1995	–	–	–	Ivan Contreras	Adam Fernsler	Jason Kepner	Fred Matheis	David Gealey	Carlos Ortiz	–	Jake Yanchar	Kevin Hourican	–	–	–	Brian Miller	Brent Lapp	Ed Josefoski	–	–	–	–	–	–	–
1995–1996	–	Dan Schall	Kevin Hardy	Ivan Contreras	–	Jason Kepner	Justin Otto	David Gealey	–	Dan Pollock	Jake Yanchar	Kevin Hourican	Brad Miller	Sergio Pampena	Damian Martorana	Uvaldo Nido	–	–	–	–	–	–	–	–	–
1996–1997	–	–	Dan Schall	Ivan Contreras	Adam Whitescarver	Jason Kepner	Justin Otto	David Gealey	Brad Miller	Dan Pollock	Jake Yanchar	Scott Lapp	Tony Mazzullo	Sergio Pampena	Damian Martorana	Kevin Munger	–	–	–	–	–	–	–	–	–
1997–1998	–	Tim Hoffman	Dan Schall	Dan Hoechst	Adam Whitescarver	Jon Hahn	George Papadakis	David Gealey	Brad Miller	Dan Pollock	Eric Houston	Scott Lapp	Tony Mazzullo	Sergio Pampena	Damian Martorana	Kevin Munger	Steve Aird	–	–	–	–	–	–	–	–
1998–1999	–	Tim Hoffman	Dan Schall	Dan Hoechst	Adam Whitescarver	Jon Hahn	George Papadakis	Jose Quinones	Brad Miller	Dan Pollock	Eric Houston	Scott Lapp	Tony Mazzullo	Sergio Pampena	Josh Briggs	Jason Hawkins	Steve Aird	–	–	–	–	–	–	–	–
1999–2000	–	Tim Hoffman	Kevin Hodge	Dan Hoechst	Adam Whitescarver	–	–	Jose Quinones	Zach Slenker	Carlos Guerra	Eric Houston	–	Zeljko Koljesar	–	Josh Briggs	Jason Hawkins	Steve Aird	–	–	–	–	–	–	–	–
2000–2001	–	Ricky Mattei	Kevin Hodge	Richard Schneider	Josh Mowrey	Rhonee Rojas	Nate Matthews	Jose Quinones	Zach Slenker	Carlos Guerra	Alex Weaver	John Mills	Zeljko Koljesar	Norman Keil	Josh Briggs	Jason Hawkins	Steve Aird	–	–	–	–	–	–	–	–
2001–2002	–	Ricky Mattei	Kevin Hodge	Richard Schneider	–	Rhonee Rojas	Nate Matthews	Jose Quinones	Zach Slenker	Carlos Guerra	Alex Weaver	John Mills	Zeljko Koljesar	Norman Keil	Keith Kowal	Jason Hawkins	–	–	–	–	–	–	–	–	–
2002–2003	–	Ricky Mattei	Dan O'Dell	Richard Schneider	Matt Proper	Rhonee Rojas	Nate Matthews	Kevin Wentzel	Zach Slenker	Carlos Guerra	Alex Weaver	Nate Meerstein	Zeljko Koljesar	Norman Keil	Keith Kowal	Josh Mowrey	Brian O'Dell	–	–	–	–	–	–	–	–
2003–2004	–	Ricky Mattei	Dan O'Dell	Kyle Masterson	Matt Proper	Rhonee Rojas	Ryan Walthall	Kevin Wentzel	Aaron Smith	Andrew Price	Alex Gutor	Nate Meerstein	Ryan Fisher	Phillip Small	Keith Kowal	Josh Mowrey	Guillermo Fernandez	–	–	–	–	–	–	–	–
2004–2005	–	Gary Vogel	Dan O'Dell	Kyle Masterson	Matt Proper	Guillermo Fernandez	Ryan Walthall	Kevin Wentzel	Aaron Smith	Andrew Price	Alex Gutor	Nate Meerstein	Dan Gwitt	–	Keith Kowal	–	Luke Murray	Travis Foltz	–	–	–	–	–	–	–
2005–2006	–	Gary Vogel	Dan O'Dell	Kyle Masterson	Matt Proper	–	Ryan Walthall	Kevin Wentzel	Aaron Smith	Andrew Price	Alex Gutor	Nate Meerstein	Max Holt	Ryan Sweitzer	Matt Anderson	Jay Stauffer	Luke Murray	Travis Foltz	–	–	–	–	–	–	–
2006–2007	–	Aaron Menges	Travis Foltz	–	Jon Sherrick	Jason Ambrose	Ryan Walthall	Craig Cruse	Aaron Smith	Max Lipsitz	Alex Gutor	–	Max Holt	Ryan Sweitzer	Matt Anderson	Jay Stauffer	Luke Murray	Alan Mars	–	–	–	–	–	–	–
2007–2008	–	Brad McCoy	Travis Foltz	Jesse Wagner	Thomas Pereira	Jason Ambrose	Dennis Del Valle	Edgardo Goás	Alan Mars	Max Lipsitz	Jon Sherrick	Will Price	Max Holt	Ryan Sweitzer	Matt Anderson	Jay Stauffer	Luke Murray	Joe Sunder	–	–	–	–	–	–	–
2008–2009	–	Brad McCoy	Tor Covello	Jesse Wagner	Thomas Pereira	Jason Ambrose	Dennis Del Valle	Edgardo Goás	Alan Mars	Max Lipsitz	Jon Sherrick	Will Price	Max Holt	Ryan Sweitzer	Ryan Wolf	Jay Stauffer	Mark Shipp	Joe Sunder	–	–	–	–	–	–	–
2009–2010	–	Brad McCoy	Tor Covello	Jesse Wagner	Thomas Pereira	Jason Ambrose	Dennis Del Valle	Edgardo Goás	Alan Mars	Max Lipsitz	Nick Turko	Will Price	Ian Hendries	Tom Comfort	Ryan Wolf	Kyle Mars	Mark Shipp	Joe Sunder	Scott Kegerreis	–	–	–	–	–	–
2010–2011	–	–	Tor Covello	Connor Curry	Nick Goodell	Kyle Mars	Dennis Del Valle	Edgardo Goás	Alan Mars	Peter Russell	Nick Turko	Jace Olsen	Ian Hendries	Tom Comfort	Ryan Wolf	Scott Kegerreis	Joe Yasalonis	Joe Sunder	–	–	–	–	–	–	–
2011–2012	–	Taylor Hammond	Tor Covello	Connor Curry	Nick Goodell	Kyle Mars	–	Edgardo Goás	Aaron Russell	Peter Russell	Nick Turko	Jace Olsen	Ian Hendries	Tom Comfort	Ryan Wolf	Scott Kegerreis	Kyle Gregan	Joe Sunder	Matt Seifert	–	–	–	–	–	–
2012–2013	–	Taylor Hammond	Zack Parik	Connor Curry	Nick Goodell	Kyle Mars	–	Andrew Roberts	Aaron Russell	Peter Russell	Nick Turko	Spencer Sauter	Ian Hendries	Tom Comfort	Matt Kapusta	Scott Kegerreis	Kyle Gregan	Matt Callaway	Matt Seifert	–	–	–	–	–	–
2013–2014	–	Taylor Hammond	Zack Parik	Connor Curry	Nick Goodell	Joseph Farell	–	Andrew Roberts	Aaron Russell	Peter Russell	Christopher Nugent	Spencer Sauter	Kevin Gear	–	Jalen Penrose	Aidan Albrecht	Kyle Gregan	Matt Callaway	Matt Seifert	–	–	–	–	–	–
2014–2015	–	Taylor Hammond	Zack Parik	Connor Curry	Nick Goodell	Parker Thompson	Royce Clemens	Andrew Roberts	Aaron Russell	Lee Smith	Christopher Nugent	Spencer Sauter	Kevin Gear	Matthew McLaren	Jalen Penrose	Aidan Albrecht	–	Matt Callaway	Matt Seifert	–	–	–	–	–	–
2015–2016	–	Taylor Hammond	Zack Parik	Frank Melvin	Luke Braswell	–	Royce Clemens	Andrew Roberts	Jason Donorovich	Lee Smith	Christopher Nugent	Spencer Sauter	Kevin Gear	Matthew McLaren	Jalen Penrose	Aidan Albrecht	Calvin Mende	Matt Callaway	Matt Seifert	–	–	–	–	–	–
2016–2017	–	Declan Pierce	–	Frank Melvin	Luke Braswell	Nathan Smith	Royce Clemens	Bobby Wilden	Jason Donorovich	Lee Smith	Christopher Nugent	Cameron Bartus	Kevin Gear	Matthew McLaren	Jalen Penrose	Aidan Albrecht	Calvin Mende	Matt Callaway	Kyle Mackiewicz	–	–	–	–	–	–
2017–2018	–	Declan Pierce	Jack Goedken	Frank Melvin	Luke Braswell	Nathan Smith	Royce Clemens	Bobby Wilden	Jason Donorovich	Lee Smith	Henry Payne	Cameron Bartus	Kevin Gear	Matthew McLaren	Jalen Penrose	Aidan Albrecht	Calvin Mende	Mathew Gagnon	Kyle Mackiewicz	Louis Murray	Will Bantle	Henrik Falck Lauten	–	–	–
2018–2019	–	Declan Pierce	Jack Goedken	Frank Melvin	Luke Braswell	Nathan Smith	Cole Bogner	Bobby Wilden	Jason Donorovich	Lee Smith	Henry Payne	Cameron Bartus	Brett Wildman	Matthew McLaren	Sam Marsh	Canyon Tuman	Calvin Mende	Henrik Falck Lauten	Kyle Mackiewicz	Cal Fisher	Will Bantle	–	–	–	–
2019–2020	–	Declan Pierce	Jack Goedken	Jack Shampine	Luke Braswell	Nathan Smith	Cole Bogner	Bobby Wilden	Jason Donorovich	John Kerr	Henry Payne	Cameron Bartus	Brett Wildman	Andrew Watts	Sam Marsh	Canyon Tuman	Calvin Mende	Henrik Falck Lauten	Kyle Mackiewicz	Cal Fisher	Will Bantle	Gabe Hartke	Jack Driscoll	Jack Howard	Tim Herget
2020–2021	–	Luke Snyder	Tim Herget	Jack Shampine	Michael Valenzi	Mitch Tucker	Cole Bogner	Bogdan Ivanov	Michal Kowal	John Kerr	Gabe Hartke	Jack Driscoll	Brett Wildman	Andrew Watts	Sam Marsh	Canyon Tuman	Ian Argento	Will Kuhns	Toby Ezeonu	Cal Fisher	Will Bantle	–	–	–	–

== See also ==
- Penn State Nittany Lions women's volleyball
