= 2021 BYU Cougars men's volleyball team =

Men's college volleyball team season

2021 BYU Cougars men's volleyball

2021 MPSF Champions

NCAA Tournament, National Runner-Up
- Conference: Mountain Pacific Sports Federation
- Record: 20-4 (17-3 MPSF)
- Head coach: Shawn Olmstead (6th season)
- Assistant coaches: Devin Young (3rd season); Micah Naone (3rd season)
- Home arena: Smith Fieldhouse

The 2021 BYU Cougars men's volleyball team represented Brigham Young University in the 2021 NCAA Division I & II men's volleyball season. The Cougars, led by sixth year head coach Shawn Olmstead, play their home games at Smith Fieldhouse. The Cougars are members of the MPSF and were picked to win the MPSF in the preseason poll. After finishing last season ranked #1 the Cougars enter the 2021 season with the #1 ranking.

2021 Mountain Pacific Sports Federation men's volleyball standings
	Conf.				Overall
Team	W		L	PCT	W		L	PCT
No. 2 BYU ‍†‍‡‍^{y}	17	–	3	.850	20	–	4	.833
No. 6 UCLA ‍‍‍	14	–	5	.737	15	–	6	.714
No. 5 Pepperdine ‍‍‍^{y}	11	–	5	.688	13	–	7	.650
No. 9 Grand Canyon ‍‍‍	8	–	10	.444	9	–	11	.450
USC ‍‍‍	5	–	12	.294	5	–	13	.278
Concordia Irvine ‍‍‍	3	–	13	.188	3	–	14	.176
Stanford ‍‍‍	3	–	13	.188	3	–	14	.176
† – Conference champion ‡ – MPSF tournament champion y – Invited to the NCAA tournament Rankings from AVCA

== Roster ==
2021 BYU Cougars roster
Defensive specialist/libero: 4 Jon Stanley - Sophomore; 6 Zach Hendrickson - Senior; 12 Mitchel Worthington - Junior; Middle blockers: 10 Gavin Julien - Sophomore; 16 Felipe de Brito Ferreira - Senior; 17 Branden Oberender - (redshirt) Junior; 18 Miki Jauhiainen - Graduate; 21 Max Pothier - (redshirt) Freshman	Outside hitters: 1 Davide Gardini - Junior; 4 Jon Stanley - Sophomore; 7 Cyrus Fa'alogo - (redshirt) Senior; 9 Andrew Lincoln - Senior; 11 Zach Eschenberg - Graduate; 13 Kana'i Akana - (redshirt) Sophomore; 20 Teilon-Jonathan Tufuga - Sophomore	Opposite hitters: 2 Alex Ah Sue - Junior; 5 Gabi Garcia Fernandez - Senior; Setters: 3 Wil Stanley - Graduate; 23 Gavin Heap - (redshirt) Freshman; 24 Brody Earnest - Junior

== Schedule ==
TV/Internet Streaming information:

All home games will be televised on BYUtv. All road games will also be streamed by the schools streaming service. The conference tournament will be streamed by FloVolleyball. The NCAA Tournament will be streamed on B1G+ (opening round, quarterfinals), NCAA.com (semifinals), and the Championship will be televised nationally on ESPNU.

Date time	Opponent	Rank^{(tournament seed)}	Arena city (tournament)	Television	Score	Attendance	Record (MPSF record)
2/4; 7 p.m.	#8 UCLA*	#1	Smith Fieldhouse; Provo, UT	BYUtv	L 1–3 (22–25, 21–25, 25–15, 22–25)	150	0–1 (0–1)
2/6; 4 p.m.	#8 UCLA*	#1	Smith Fieldhouse; Provo, UT	BYUtv	W 3–0 (25–16, 25–21, 25–17)	150	1–1 (1–1)
2/12; 7 p.m.	#7 Pepperdine*	#1	Smith Fieldhouse; Provo, UT	BYUtv	W 3–0 (25–6, 25–23, 28–26)	150	2–1 (2–1)
2/13; 7 p.m.	#7 Pepperdine*	#1	Smith Fieldhouse; Provo, UT	BYUtv	W 3–1 (23–25, 28–26, 25–23, 26–24)	150	3–1 (3–1)
2/18; 7 p.m.	#10 Grand Canyon*	#1	Smith Fieldhouse; Provo, UT	BYUtv.org	W 3–1 (26–24, 23–25, 25–18, 25–20)	150	4–1 (4–1)
2/20; 7 p.m.	#10 Grand Canyon*	#1	Smith Fieldhouse; Provo, UT	BYUtv	W 3–2 (25–27, 28–26, 23–25, 25–23, 15–11)	159	5–1 (5–1)
2/25; 6 p.m.	@ #9 Grand Canyon*	#1	GCU Arena; Phoenix, AZ	GCU TV	L 0–3 (22–25, 43–45, 10–25)	576	5–2 (5–2)
2/27; 12 p.m.	@ #9 Grand Canyon*	#1	GCU Arena; Phoenix, AZ	GCU TV	W 3–0 (25–19, 25–19, 25–13)	N/A	6–2 (6–2)
3/4; 8 p.m.	@ Concordia Irvine*	#2	CU Arena; Irvine, CA	Eagle TV on Stretch Internet	W 3–0 (25–20, 25–19, 25–19)	0	7–2 (7–2)
3/5; 6 p.m.	@ USC*	#2	Galen Center; Los Angeles, CA	P12+ USC	W 3–0 (25–22, 25–20, 25–20)	0	8–2 (8–2)
3/12; 7 p.m.	Stanford*	#2	Smith Fieldhouse; Provo, UT	BYUtv	W 3–0 (25–16, 25–15, 25–16)	500	9–2 (9–2)
3/13; 7 p.m.	Stanford*	#2	Smith Fieldhouse; Provo, UT	BYUtv	W 3–0 (25–19, 25–22, 25–19)	500	10–2 (10–2)
3/19; 2 p.m.	@ #4 Pepperdine*	#2	Firestone Fieldhouse; Malibu, CA	WaveCasts	W 3–1 (20–25, 25–17, 25–21, 25–17)	0	11–2 (11–2)
3/20; 2 p.m.	@ #4 Pepperdine*	#2	Firestone Fieldhouse; Malibu, CA	WaveCasts	W 3–0 (25–21, 25–14, 25–20)	0	12–2 (12–2)
3/26; 8 p.m.	@ Concordia Irvine*	#2	CU Arena; Irvine, CA	Eagle TV on Stretch Internet	W 3–0 (25–19, 25–20, 25–23)	0	13–2 (13–2)
3/27; 8 p.m.	@ Concorida Irvine*	#2	CU Arena; Irvine, CA	Eagle TV on Stretch Internet	W 3–0 (25–22, 25–17, 25–16)	0	14–2 (14–2)
4/1; 7 p.m.	USC*	#2	Smith Fieldhouse; Provo, UT	BYUtv	W 3–0 (25–22, 25–18, 25–16)	500	15–2 (15–2)
4/2; 7 p.m.	USC*	#2	Smith Fieldhouse; Provo, UT	BYUtv	W 3–1 (25–19, 25–21, 24–26, 25–20)	500	16–2 (16–2)
4/9; 6 p.m.	@ #6 UCLA*	#2	Pauley Pavilion; Los Angeles, CA	P12+ UCLA	W 3–0 (25–19, 25–16, 25–17)	0	17–2 (17–2)
4/10; 6 p.m.	@ #6 UCLA*	#2	Pauley Pavilion; Los Angeles, CA	P12+ UCLA	L 1–3 (18–25, 25–21, 25–27, 15–25)	0	17–3 (17–3)
4/23; 7 p.m.	#9 ^{(4)} Grand Canyon	#2^{(1)}	Smith Fieldhouse; Provo, UT (MPSF Semifinal)	FloVolleyball	W 3–0 (25–14, 25–19, 29–27)	700	18–3 (17–3)
4/23; 7 p.m.	#5 ^{(3)} Pepperdine	#2^{(1)}	Smith Fieldhouse; Provo, UT (MPSF Championship)	FloVolleyball	W 3–0 (25–23, 25–15, 25–19)	750	19–3 (17–3)
5/6; 6 p.m.	#4 Lewis	#2^{(2)}	Covelli Center; Columbus, OH (NCAA Semifinal)	NCAA.com	W 3–1 (25–22, 25–15, 26–28, 25–20)	275	20–3
5/6; 6 p.m.	#1 Hawai'i^{(1)}	#2^{(2)}	Covelli Center; Columbus, OH (NCAA Championship)	ESPNU	L 0–3 (21–25, 19–25, 16–25)	345	20–4

*-Indicates conference match.
Times listed are Mountain Time Zone.

== Announcers for televised games ==
- UCLA: Jarom Jordan & Steve Vail
- UCLA: Jarom Jordan & Steve Vail
- Pepperdine: Jarom Jordan & Steve Vail
- Pepperdine: Jarom Jordan & Steve Vail
- Grand Canyon: Jarom Jordan & Steve Vail
- Grand Canyon: Jarom Jordan & Steve Vail
- Grand Canyon: Kyle Borg & Diana Johnson
- Grand Canyon: Kyle Borg & Diana Johnson
- Concordia Irvine: Viola Patience O'Neal
- USC: Mark Beltran & Paul Duchesne
- Stanford: Jarom Jordan & Steve Vail
- Stanford: Jarom Jordan & Steve Vail
- Pepperdine: Al Epstein
- Pepperdine: Al Epstein
- Concordia Irvine: Viola Patience O'Neal
- Concordia Irvine: Anthony Calderon
- USC: Jarom Jordan & Steve Vail
- USC: Jarom Jordan & Steve Vail
- UCLA: Denny Cline
- UCLA: Denny Cline
- Grand Canyon: Jarom Jordan & Steve Vail
- Pepperdine: Jarom Jordan & Steve Vail
- Lewis: Paul Sunderland & Kevin Barnett
- Hawai'i: Paul Sunderland & Kevin Barnett

== Rankings ==
Ranking movements Legend: ██ Increase in ranking ██ Decrease in ranking т = Tied with team above or below ( ) = First-place votes
	Week															
Poll	Pre	1	2	3	4	5	6	7	8	9	10	11	12	13	14	Final
AVCA Coaches	1 (14)	1 (14)	1 (13)	1 (8)	1 (13)	1 (13)	2 (1)	2 (1)	2 (1)	2 (1)	2 (1)	2 (1)	2 (1)	2 (1)	2 (5)	2
Off the Block Media	1^	1 (9)	1 (10)	2 (4)	1т (5)	2 (5)	2	3	2	2	2	2	2	2^	2^	2

^The Media did not release a Pre-season, Week 13, or Week 14 poll.
