= 1991 Men's European Volleyball Championship =

Tournament details
- Host country: Germany
- Dates: September 7–15
- Teams: 12
- Venues: 2 (in 2 host cities)

Final positions
- Champions: Soviet Union (12th title)

The 1991 Men's European Volleyball Championship was the seventeenth edition of the event, organized by Europe's governing volleyball body, the Confédération Européenne de Volleyball. It was hosted in Hamburg and Berlin, Germany from September 7 to September 15, 1991.

== Teams ==
Group A – Hamburg

- Bulgaria
- Czechoslovakia
- France
- Italy
- Netherlands
- Yugoslavia

Group B – Berlin

- Finland
- Germany
- Greece
- Poland
- Soviet Union
- Sweden

== Final round ==
Semi-finals
1991-09-14 – Berlin
Italy	3
Germany	1
1991-09-14 – Berlin
Soviet Union	3
Netherlands	0

Final
1991-09-15 – Berlin
Italy	0
Soviet Union	3
3rd place
1991-09-15 – Berlin
Germany	0
Netherlands	3

5-8th place
1991-09-14 – Berlin
Bulgaria	3
Finland	0
1991-09-14 – Berlin
Yugoslavia	3
Poland	1

5th place
1991-09-15 – Berlin
Bulgaria	3
Yugoslavia	1
7th place
1991-09-15 – Berlin
Finland	1
Poland	3

== Final ranking ==
Place	Team
1st place, gold medalist(s)	Soviet Union
2nd place, silver medalist(s)	Italy
3rd place, bronze medalist(s)	Netherlands
4.	Germany
5.	Bulgaria
6.	Yugoslavia
7.	Poland
8.	Finland
9.	France
10.	Sweden
11.	Greece
12.	Czechoslovakia

1991 Men's European champions

Soviet Union
Twelfth title

Team Roster
Yuri Cherednik, Dmitry Fomin, Sergey Vladimirovich Gorbunov, Yuri Koroviansky, Evgeni Krasilnikov, Andrei Kuznetsov, Ruslan Olikhver, Igor Runov, Yuri Sapega, Aleksandr Shadchin, Oleg Shatunov, and Konstantin Ushakov.
Head coach: Viacheslav Platonov.
