= Eastern Intercollegiate Volleyball Association =

US college athletic conference

- Formerly: Eastern Collegiate Volleyball League (ECVL)
- Association: NCAA
- Founded: 1971
- Commissioner: Russ Yurk
- Sports fielded: Volleyball; men's: 1; women's: 0
- No. of teams: 7
- Region: Northeast
- Website: www.eivavolleyball.com/%20eivavolleyball.com

The Eastern Intercollegiate Volleyball Association (EIVA) is a college athletic conference whose member schools compete in men's volleyball. Its member institutions are located in the Northeast United States.

The EIVA Tournament champion receives one of six automatic bids to the NCAA National Collegiate Men's Volleyball Championship. The other five automatic bids go to the two other traditional major volleyball conferences, the MIVA (Midwestern Intercollegiate Volleyball Association) and the MPSF (Mountain Pacific Sports Federation); the Big West Conference, which in the 2017–18 school year became the first Division I all-sports conference ever to sponsor men's volleyball; and two Division II conferences in Conference Carolinas and the Southern Intercollegiate Athletic Conference (SIAC). Before the 2014 tournament, the EIVA, MIVA, and MPSF received three of the four bids to the NCAA tournament, with the remaining entry being an at-large bid that was chosen from one of the three leagues by a committee of coaches from these leagues. The tournament expanded to six teams in 2014 when Conference Carolinas was given its automatic bid, seven in 2018 with the addition of the Big West champion, and eight in 2024 with the addition of the SIAC champion. The current lineup consists of the six conference champions and two at-large entries.

Penn State won every conference championship from 1991 through 2017, with the exception of 1998 when Princeton captured the title and 2016 when George Mason won the title. Harvard and Princeton emerged on top in 2018 and 2019, respectively. The Nittany Lions are the only conference team to win the NCAA national championships, having captured the title in 1994 and 2008.

As of the current 2025 season (2024–25 school year), the EIVA consists of seven schools: the University of Charleston (WV), George Mason University, Harvard University, the New Jersey Institute of Technology (NJIT), Pennsylvania State University (Penn State), Princeton University, and Sacred Heart University. All are Division I members except for D-II Charleston. The top four teams compete for the EIVA championship. The winner represents the conference in the NCAA Div. I/II national championships.

The most recent change to the EIVA membership was the return of Sacred Heart for the spring 2025 season after a two-year absence. The Pioneers had left the EIVA after the 2022 season to join the new men's volleyball league of its then-current primary home of the Northeast Conference (NEC), but returned to the EIVA when it left the NEC to join the Metro Atlantic Athletic Conference.

The establishment of NEC men's volleyball also led to the 2022 departure of St. Francis College (known athletically as St. Francis Brooklyn, from its New York City location) and Saint Francis University (in Pennsylvania). This temporarily left the EIVA with six members, the minimum needed to maintain its automatic NCAA tournament berth.

Previously, from 2005-2006 to 2010-2011, the conference was divided into two divisions. The higher division was named the Tait Division and the lower division was named the Hay Division. The conference used a system of promotion and relegation whereby the last place team from the Tait Division went to the Hay for the following season and the highest ranked Hay Division team moved to the Tait. Prior to that, there was a second lower division (equal to Hay) named the Sweeney Division, but this was eliminated for the 2006 season. The two lower divisions were merged into one division at that time.

On April 28, 2012, Uvaldo Acosta (George Mason), Tom Hay (Springfield College), Ivan Marquez (Concordia [NY]), Bill Odeneal (SUNY New Paltz), Bob Sweeney (East Stroudsburg), and Tom Tait (Penn State) were inducted into the EIVA's inaugural Hall of Fame class during the 2012 EIVA Championship match at Penn State.

== Members ==
Since the 2024–25 school year, the EIVA has had seven member teams, six from the NCAA's Division I. The University of Charleston of Division II joined the conference for competition in 2016 after spending the 2015 season as an independent. The most recent changes in membership were the 2022 departure of Sacred Heart, St. Francis Brooklyn, and Saint Francis (PA) for the NEC, followed in 2024 by Sacred Heart's return to the EIVA.

Through the 2014 season, Division III Rutgers–Newark had been the EIVA's eighth member but spent its final years in the EIVA transitioning to Division III men's volleyball and left for the D-III Continental Volleyball Conference in 2015. Because Rutgers–Newark traditionally competed in the former University Division in men's volleyball before the NCAA created its current three-division setup in 1972, it had been allowed to award scholarships in that sport, making it one of only seven D-III schools then allowed to do so in any sport. As part of its D-III transition, it stopped awarding scholarships to new athletes in the 2011 season.

School	Location	Team nickname	Primary conference	Joined EIVA (Note: First season of EIVA competition, which takes place in the calendar year after a school formally joins.)
University of Charleston	Charleston, West Virginia	Golden Eagles	Mountain East (Division II)	2016
George Mason University	Fairfax, Virginia (Note: The main George Mason campus has a Fairfax mailing address, but is in a part of unincorporated Fairfax County designated by the U.S. Census Bureau as George Mason, Virginia. Fairfax County encloses but does not include the city of Fairfax.)	Patriots	Atlantic 10	1977
Harvard University	Cambridge, Massachusetts (Note: Although most of Harvard's athletic facilities and its athletic administration are in Boston, the volleyball arena is in Cambridge, which also hosts Harvard's overall administration and undergraduate campus.)	Crimson	Ivy League	1982
New Jersey Institute of Technology (NJIT)	Newark, New Jersey	Highlanders	America East	1977
Pennsylvania State University (Penn State)	University Park, Pennsylvania	Nittany Lions	Big Ten	1972
Princeton University	Princeton, New Jersey	Tigers	Ivy League	1977
Sacred Heart University	Fairfield, Connecticut	Pioneers	Metro	2025 (Note: Sacred Heart had been an EIVA member from 1993 to 2022.)

== Conference arenas ==
School	Facility	Capacity
Charleston	H. Bernard Wehrle Sr. Athletic Arena	1,551
George Mason	Recreation Athletic Complex	1,550
Harvard	Malkin Athletic Center	1,000
NJIT	Wellness and Events Center (WEC)	3,500
Penn State	Rec Hall	6,469
Princeton	Dillon Gym	1,500
Sacred Heart	William H. Pitt Center	2,000

== Former members ==
School	Location	Team nickname	Joined EIVA (Note: First season of EIVA competition, which takes place in the calendar year after a school formally joins.)	Left EIVA	Current men's volleyball conference
Concordia College	Bronxville, New York	Clippers		2003	—N/a (Note: Dropped men's volleyball in 2003; closed in 2021.)
East Stroudsburg University of Pennsylvania	East Stroudsburg, Pennsylvania	Warriors		2008	—N/a (Note: No longer sponsors men's volleyball.)
Juniata College	Huntingdon, Pennsylvania	Eagles		2011	Continental Volleyball Conference (D-III)
University of New Haven	West Haven, Connecticut	Chargers		2008	—N/a
State University of New York at New Paltz (New Paltz)	New Paltz, New York	Hawks		1999	New England Women's and Men's Athletic Conference (D-III)
New York University (NYU)	New York, New York	Violets		2011	New England Women's and Men's Athletic Conference (D-III)
Queens College, City University of New York	Queens, New York	Knights			—N/a
Rutgers University–Newark	Newark, New Jersey	Scarlet Raiders		2014	Continental Volleyball Conference (D-III)
St. Francis College (St. Francis Brooklyn)	Brooklyn, New York	Terriers	2022	2022	—N/a (Note: Athletic program discontinued in 2023.)
Saint Francis University	Loretto, Pennsylvania	Red Flash (Note: Saint Francis used the "Red Flash" nickname throughout its EIVA tenure. The nickname changed to "Red Wolves" in 2026, coinciding with SFU's move to NCAA Division III.)	1977	2022	Presidents' Athletic Conference (D-III}
Southampton College	Southampton, New York				—N/a (Note: Southampton College closed in 2005; it has since become a campus of Stony Brook University.)
Springfield College	Springfield, Massachusetts	Pride	1977	2011	New England Women's and Men's Athletic Conference (D-III)
Vassar College	Poughkeepsie, New York	Brewers			New England Women's and Men's Athletic Conference (D-III)
