= 2021 NCAA men's volleyball tournament =

Men's college volleyball tournament

Tournament details
- Dates: May 3–8
- Teams: 7

Final positions
- Champions: Hawaiʻi (1st title)
- Runners-up: BYU

Tournament statistics
- Matches played: 6
- Attendance: 1,318 (220 per match)

Awards
- Most Outstanding Player: Rado Parapunov ^{(Hawai'i)}

The 2021 NCAA men's volleyball tournament was the 51st edition of the NCAA men's volleyball tournament, an annual tournament to determine the national champion of NCAA Division I and Division II men's collegiate indoor volleyball. The single-elimination tournament began with a play-in match. The entire tournament was hosted by Ohio State University from May 3 to 8, 2021 at Covelli Center in Columbus, Ohio. Hawaii won its first title by defeating BYU 3–0 (their 2002 title was vacated due to NCAA violations).

== Bids ==
The tournament field was announced on NCAA.com Sunday, April 25, 2021 at 1 p.m. EDT.

School	Conference	Record	Berth	Source
UC Santa Barbara	Big West	15–4	Tournament champion	
BYU	MPSF	19–3	Tournament champion	
Lewis	MIVA	19–2	Tournament champion	
Belmont Abbey	Conference Carolinas	15–7	Tournament champion	
Penn State	EIVA	21–3	Tournament champion	
Hawai'i	Big West	15–1	At-large	
Pepperdine	MPSF	13–6	At-large	

== Tournament bracket ==
Opening Round; Monday, May 3 B1G+
6	Penn State	3
7	Belmont Abbey	0

Quarterfinals; Tuesday, May 4 B1G+
4	UC Santa Barbara	3
5	Pepperdine	1
3	Lewis	3
6	Penn State	0

Semifinals; Thursday, May 6 NCAA.com
1	Hawai'i	3
4	UC Santa Barbara	0
2	BYU	3
3	Lewis	1

National Championship; Saturday, May 8 ESPNU
1	Hawai'i	3
2	BYU	0

== Schedule and results ==
All times Eastern.

Game	Time	Matchup	Score	Attendance	Broadcasters
Opening Round – Monday, May 3
1	5:00 p.m.	Penn State vs. Belmont Abbey	3–0 (25–22, 25–13, 25–19)	223	Luke Wood Maloney & Ben Spurlock
Quarterfinals – Tuesday, May 4
2	5:00 p.m.	UC Santa Barbara vs. Pepperdine	3–1 (25–23, 25–22, 22–25, 28–26)	108	Luke Wood Maloney & Ben Spurlock
3	8:00 p.m.	Lewis vs. Penn State	3–0 (25–23, 27–25, 25–20)	144	Luke Wood Maloney & Ben Spurlock
Semifinals – Thursday, May 6
4	5:00 p.m.	Hawai'i vs. UC Santa Barbara	3–0 (25–21, 25–18, 25–23)	223	Paul Sunderland & Kevin Barnett
5	8:00 p.m.	BYU vs. Lewis	3–1 (25–22, 25–15, 26–28, 25–20)	275	Paul Sunderland & Kevin Barnett
National Championship – Saturday, May 8
6	8:00 p.m.	Hawai'i vs. BYU	3–0 (25–21, 25–19, 25–16)	345	Paul Sunderland & Kevin Barnett

== Game summaries ==
All times Eastern.

=== Opening round ===
May 3, 2021; 5:00 p.m.	Penn State	3–0	Belmont Abbey	Covelli Center — Columbus, OH; Attendance: 223; Referees: Bill Forrester, Brian Hemelgran, Jim Findura, Krystian Krzyzak
May 3, 2021; 5:00 p.m.	(25–22, 25–13, 25–19); Report			Covelli Center — Columbus, OH; Attendance: 223; Referees: Bill Forrester, Brian Hemelgran, Jim Findura, Krystian Krzyzak

=== Quarterfinals ===
May 4, 2021; 5:00 p.m.	UC Santa Barbara	3–1	Pepperdine	Covelli Center — Columbus, OH; Attendance: 108; Referees: Brian Hemelgarn, Keith Murlless, Krystian Krzyzak, Barb Zvonek
May 4, 2021; 5:00 p.m.	(25–23, 25–22, 22–25, 28–26); Report			Covelli Center — Columbus, OH; Attendance: 108; Referees: Brian Hemelgarn, Keith Murlless, Krystian Krzyzak, Barb Zvonek

May 4, 2021; 8:00 p.m.	Lewis	3–0	Penn State	Covelli Center — Columbus, OH; Attendance: 144; Referees: Keith Murlless, Bill Forrester, Barb Zvonek, Shane White
May 4, 2021; 8:00 p.m.	(25–23, 27–25, 25–20); Report			Covelli Center — Columbus, OH; Attendance: 144; Referees: Keith Murlless, Bill Forrester, Barb Zvonek, Shane White

=== Semifinals ===
May 6, 2021; 5:00 p.m.	Hawai'i	3–0	UC Santa Barbara	Covelli Center — Columbus, OH; Attendance: 223; Referees: Brian Hemelgarn, Bill Forrester, Jim Findura, Krystian Krzyzak
May 6, 2021; 5:00 p.m.	(25–21, 25–18, 25–23); Report			Covelli Center — Columbus, OH; Attendance: 223; Referees: Brian Hemelgarn, Bill Forrester, Jim Findura, Krystian Krzyzak

May 6, 2021; 8:00 p.m.	BYU	3–1	Lewis	Covelli Center — Columbus, OH; Attendance: 275; Referees: Bill Forrester, Keith Murlles, Barb Zvonek, Rachel Jensen
May 6, 2021; 8:00 p.m.	(25–22, 25–15, 26–28, 25–20); Report			Covelli Center — Columbus, OH; Attendance: 275; Referees: Bill Forrester, Keith Murlles, Barb Zvonek, Rachel Jensen

=== National Championship ===
May 8, 2021; 8:00 p.m.	Hawai'i	3–0	BYU	Covelli Center — Columbus, OH; Attendance: 345; Referees: Brian Hemelgarn, Bill Forrester, Keith Murless, Jim Findura
May 8, 2021; 8:00 p.m.	(25–21, 25–19, 25–16); Report			Covelli Center — Columbus, OH; Attendance: 345; Referees: Brian Hemelgarn, Bill Forrester, Keith Murless, Jim Findura

== All Tournament Team ==
- Rado Parapunov, Hawai'i (Most Outstanding Player)
- Patrick Gasman, Hawai'i
- Jakob Thelle, Hawai'i
- Gabi García Fernández, BYU
- Wil Stanley, BYU
- Casey McGarry, UC Santa Barbara
- Tyler Mitchem, Lewis
