= Tom Tait (volleyball) =

American volleyball coach (1937–2024)

Biographical details
- Born: December 13, 1937; Washington, DC, U.S.
- Died: January 11, 2024 (aged 86); Huntingdon, Pennsylvania, U.S.
- Education: Pennsylvania State University (PhD); University of Maryland (BSc)

Coaching career (HC unless noted)
- 1976–1978: Penn State (Women's)
- 1977–1989: Penn State (Men's)

Head coaching record
- Overall: 405–150–5 (.728)

Accomplishments and honors

Championships
- 8x EIVA Champions (1980–1983, 1985–1988)

Awards
- AVCA Hall of Fame (2003) USA Volleyball All-Time Great Coach (2007); EIVA Hall of Fame (2012) 5x Eastern Collegiate Coach of the Year EIVA Coach Emeritus

George Thomas Tait (December 13, 1937 – January 11, 2024) was an American volleyball coach. He founded both the Penn State Nittany Lions women's volleyball and Penn State Nittany Lions men's volleyball teams beginning in 1974. Since then, the teams have won a combined 9 NCAA national championships (women's: 7; men's: 2). Because of his success in developing the Penn State programs, he was known as the "founding father" of Penn State volleyball.

== Early life ==
Tait attended the University of Maryland, College Park, where he was an All-American high jumper on the Maryland Terrapins track and field team placing 6th at the 1959 NCAA Track and Field Championships.

== Penn State ==
Tait received his Ph.D. from Penn State in 1969 and became a faculty member. Prior to going into volleyball, he served as assistant track and field coach. He was approached by both the men's and women's volleyball clubs to help build the programs in 1974.

=== Women's team ===
Tait began building the Penn State women's volleyball program in the early 1970s, elevating them from club to varsity status. The first official team began playing in 1976. Tait, who was also coaching the men's team, decided to focus on the men's team and passed the helm to Russ Rose, who would go on to become one of the most successful women’s volleyball coaches in NCAA history.

=== Men's team ===
Tait officially elevated the men's team from club status to an NCAA Division I Program in 1977. During his time coaching the team, he won 8 conference titles and reached the NCAA Final Four 6 times.

== Other works ==
Tait also coached the men's United States national volleyball teams in 1984 and 1988.

In addition to his coaching, he was a professor at Penn State in kinesiology. Tait retired from teaching at Penn State in 1996, and was a Distinguished Service Professor of Exercise Science and Coaching at Brevard College from 1996 through 2006.

== Death ==
Tait died on January 11, 2024, at the age of 86.

== Awards ==
- 1986 Volleyball Monthly National Coach of the Year
- 5 times Eastern Collegiate Coach of the Year
- EIVA Coach Emeritus
- EIVA Hall of Fame (2012)
- Member of the inaugural AVCA Hall of Fame induction class (2003)
- USA Volleyball All Time Great Coach.

== Head coaching record ==
Record table
| Season | Team | Overall | Conference | Standing | Postseason |
|---|---|---|---|---|---|
Penn State (women's) () (1976–1978)
| 1976 | Penn State | 6–11–3 | | | |
| 1977 | Penn State | 25–18 | | | EAIAW Participant |
| 1978 | Penn State | 20–14–1 | | | EAIAW Participant |
| Penn State: | | 51–43–4 (.541) | | | |
Penn State (men's) (EIVA) (1977–1989)
| 1977 | Penn State | 37–8–2 | 5–1 | 3rd | |
| 1978 | Penn State | 30–10 | 4–2 | 3rd | |
| 1979 | Penn State | 32–6 | 7–1 | 2nd | |
| 1980 | Penn State | 19–9 | 7–1 | T–1st | |
| 1981 | Penn State | 33–5 | 9–1 | 1st | NCAA Final Four |
| 1982 | Penn State | 35–5 | 9–0 | 1st | NCAA Runner-Up |
| 1983 | Penn State | 22–6–3 | 9–0 | 1st | NCAA Final Four |
| 1984 | Penn State | 18–10 | 4–2 | 2nd | |
| 1985 | Penn State | 15–15 | 4–2 | 1st | |
| 1986 | Penn State | 33–9 | 6–0 | 1st | NCAA Final Four |
| 1987 | Penn State | 30–5 | 8–0 | 1st | NCAA Final Four |
| 1988 | Penn State | 29–5 | 8–0 | 1st | |
| 1989 | Penn State | 21–14 | 6–2 | 2nd | NCAA Final Four |
| Penn State: | | 354–107–5 (.765) | | | |
| Total: | | 405–150–5 (.728) | | | |
National champion Postseason invitational champion Conference regular season champion Conference regular season and conference tournament champion Division regular season champion Division regular season and conference tournament champion Conference tournament champion
