= 2009 NCAA men's volleyball tournament =

Tournament details
- Dates: May 2009
- Teams: 4

Final positions
- Champions: UC Irvine (2nd title)
- Runners-up: USC (11th title match)

Tournament statistics
- Matches played: 3
- Attendance: 5,572 (1,857 per match)

Awards
- Best player: Ryan Ammerman (UC Irvine)

The 2009 NCAA men's volleyball tournament was the 40th annual tournament to determine the national champion of NCAA men's collegiate indoor volleyball. The single elimination tournament was played at Smith Fieldhouse in Provo, Utah during May 2009.

UC Irvine defeated USC in the final match, 3–2 (26–30, 30–23, 26–30, 30–17, 15–12), to win their second national title. The Anteaters (27–5) were coached by John Speraw.

UC Irvine's Ryan Ammerman was named the tournament's Most Outstanding Player. Ammerman, along with six other players, comprised the All Tournament Team.

== Qualification ==
Until the creation of the NCAA Men's Division III Volleyball Championship in 2012, there was only a single national championship for men's volleyball. As such, all NCAA men's volleyball programs, whether from Division I, Division II, or Division III, were eligible. A total of 4 teams were invited to contest this championship.

Team	Appearance	Previous
UC Irvine	3rd	2007
Ohio State	16th	2008
Penn State	24th	2008
USC	12th	1991

== Tournament bracket ==
- Site: Smith Fieldhouse, Provo, Utah

Semifinals
USC (3)	27	30	30	30
Penn State (1)	30	26	26	24
UC Irvine (3)	30	30	30
Ohio State (0)	25	25	26

Championship
USC (2)	30	23	30	17	12
UC Irvine (3)	26	30	26	30	15

== All tournament team ==
- Ryan Ammerman, UC Irvine (Most outstanding player)
- Carson Clark, UC Irvine
- Taylor Wilson, UC Irvine
- Riley McKibbin, USC
- Murphy Troy, USC
- Austin Zahn, USC
- Will Price, Penn State
