= 2002 NCAA men's volleyball tournament =

Tournament details
- Dates: May 2002
- Teams: 4

Final positions
- Champions: Hawaiʻi (Title vacated)
- Runners-up: Pepperdine (9th title match)

Tournament statistics
- Matches played: 3
- Attendance: 10,614 (3,538 per match)

Awards
- Best player: (Greece) Costas Theocharidis (Hawaiʻi) (Vacated)

The 2002 NCAA men's volleyball tournament was the 33rd annual tournament to determine the national champion of NCAA men's collegiate indoor volleyball. The single elimination tournament was played at Rec Hall in University Park, Pennsylvania during May 2002.

Hawaiʻi defeated Pepperdine in the final match, 3–1 (29–31, 31–29, 30–21, 30–24), to win their first national title. However, the NCAA Committee on Infractions ultimately vacated the Rainbow Warriors' tournament appearance, wins, and championship. The championship was not reawarded to Pepperdine. Hawaiʻi (24–8) was coached by Mike Wilton.

Hawaiʻi's Costas Theocharidis was originally named the tournament's Most Outstanding Player. However, this award was revoked when Hawaiʻi's title was vacated by the NCAA. Additionally, Theocharidis and teammate Tony Ching were both removed from the six-man All Tournament Team.

== Qualification ==
Until the creation of the NCAA Men's Division III Volleyball Championship in 2012, there was only a single national championship for men's volleyball. As such, all NCAA men's volleyball programs, whether from Division I, Division II, or Division III, were eligible. A total of 4 teams were invited to contest this championship.

Team	Appearance	Previous
Ball State	15th	1997
Hawaiʻi	3rd	1996
Penn State	17th	2001
Pepperdine	11th	2000

- Note: Hawaiʻi's appearance, including their championship, was vacated by the NCAA Committee on Infractions.

== Tournament bracket ==
- Site: Rec Hall, University Park, Pennsylvania

Semifinals
–	Hawaiʻi (3)	30	27	35	30
–	Penn State (1)	26	30	33	27
–	Pepperdine (3)	30	30	30	33
–	Ball State (1)	32	19	20	31

Championship
–	Hawaiʻi (3)	29	31	30	30
–	Pepperdine (1)	31	29	21	24

- Note: Hawaiʻi's wins were all vacated by the NCAA Committee on Infractions.

== All tournament team ==
- (Greece) Costas Theocharidis, Hawaiʻi (Most outstanding player) (Vacated)
- Tony Ching, Hawaiʻi (Vacated)
- Brad Keenan, Pepperdine
- Lance Walker, Pepperdine
- (Mexico) Carlos Guerra, Penn State
- Paul Fasshauer, Ball State
