= 1990 NCAA men's volleyball tournament =

Tournament details
- Dates: May 1990
- Teams: 4

Final positions
- Champions: USC (4th title)
- Runners-up: Long Beach State (3rd title match)

Tournament statistics
- Matches played: 4
- Attendance: 8,347 (2,087 per match)

Awards
- Best player: Bryan Ivie (USC)

The 1990 NCAA men's volleyball tournament was the 21st annual tournament to determine the national champion of NCAA men's collegiate volleyball. The tournament was played at the Patriot Center in Fairfax, Virginia during May 1990.

USC defeated Long Beach State in the final match, 3–1 (15–10, 12–15, 15–4, 15–6), to win their fourth national title. The Trojans (26–7) were coached by Jim McLaughlin.

USC's Bryan Ivie was named the tournament's Most Outstanding Player. Ivie, along with five other players, comprised the All-Tournament Team.

== Qualification ==
Until the creation of the NCAA Men's Division III Volleyball Championship in 2012, there was only a single national championship for men's volleyball. As such, all NCAA men's volleyball programs, whether from Division I, Division II, or Division III, were eligible. A total of 4 teams were invited to contest this championship.

Team	Appearance	Previous
Ball State	11th	1989
Long Beach State	3rd	1973
Rutgers–Newark	5th	1980
USC	10th	1988

== Tournament bracket ==
- Site: Patriot Center, Fairfax, Virginia

Semifinals
USC (3)	15	15	15
Ball State (0)	4	11	10
Long Beach State (3)	15	15	15
Rutgers–Newark (0)	4	8	5

Championship
USC (3)	15	12	15	15
Long Beach State (1)	10	15	4	6
Third place
Ball State (3)	15	15	7	15
Rutgers–Newark (1)	12	4	15	6

== All tournament team ==
- Bryan Ivie, USC (Most outstanding player)
- Dan Greenbaum, USC
- Jason Perkins, USC
- Kevin Shepard, USC
- Brent Hilliard, Long Beach State
- Mark Kerins, Long Beach State
