= 1988 NCAA men's volleyball tournament =

Tournament details
- Dates: May 1988
- Teams: 4

Final positions
- Champions: USC (3rd title)
- Runners-up: UC Santa Barbara (4th title match)

Tournament statistics
- Matches played: 4
- Attendance: 12,807 (3,202 per match)

Awards
- Best player: Jen-Kai Liu (USC)

The 1988 NCAA men's volleyball tournament was the 19th annual tournament to determine the national champion of NCAA men's collegiate volleyball. The tournament was played at the Allen County War Memorial Coliseum in Fort Wayne, Indiana during May 1988.

USC defeated UC Santa Barbara in the final match, 3–2 (15–17, 14–16, 15–10, 15–11, 15–9), to win their third national title. The Trojans (34–4) were coached by Bob Yoder.

USC's Jen-Kai Liu was named the tournament's Most Outstanding Player. Liu, along with five other players, also comprised the All-tournament team.

== Qualification ==
Until the creation of the NCAA Men's Division III Volleyball Championship in 2012, there was only a single national championship for men's volleyball. As such, all NCAA men's volleyball programs, whether from Division I, Division II, or Division III, were eligible. A total of 4 teams were invited to contest this championship.

Team	Appearance	Previous
Ball State	9th	1985
UC Santa Barbara	6th	1975
George Mason	3rd	1985
USC	9th	1987

== Tournament bracket ==
- Site: Allen County War Memorial Coliseum, Fort Wayne, Indiana

Semifinals
UC Santa Barbara (3)	15	15	15
George Mason (0)	9	9	13
USC (3)	15	15	15
Ball State (0)	7	7	11

Championship
UC Santa Barbara (2)	17	16	10	11	9
USC (3)	15	14	15	15	15
Third place
George Mason (1)	16	13	9	14
Ball State (3)	14	15	15	16

== All tournament team ==
- Jen-Kai Liu, USC (Most outstanding player)
- Tom Duke, USC
- Bryan Ivie, USC
- Mike Lauterman, USC
- David Rottman, UC Santa Barbara
- John Wallace, UC Santa Barbara
