= 1994 NCAA men's volleyball tournament =

Tournament details
- Dates: May 1994
- Teams: 4

Final positions
- Champions: Penn State (1st title)
- Runners-up: UCLA (16th title match)

Tournament statistics
- Matches played: 4
- Attendance: 15,495 (3,874 per match)

Awards
- Best player: Ramón Hernández (Penn State)

The 1994 NCAA men's volleyball tournament was the 25th annual tournament to determine the national champion of NCAA men's collegiate volleyball. The single elimination tournament was played at the Allen County War Memorial Coliseum in Fort Wayne, Indiana during May 1994.

Penn State defeated UCLA in the final match, 3–2 (9–15, 15–13, 4–15, 15–12, 15–12), to win their first national title. They became the first champions in tournament history to not be from California. The Nittany Lions (26–3) were coached by Tom Peterson.

Penn State's Ramón Hernández was named the tournament's Most Outstanding Player. Hernández, along with five other players, comprised the All-Tournament Team.

== Qualification ==
Until the creation of the NCAA Men's Division III Volleyball Championship in 2012, there was only a single national championship for men's volleyball. As such, all NCAA men's volleyball programs, whether from Division I or Division II were eligible. A total of 4 teams were invited to contest this championship.

Team	Appearance	Previous
Ball State	12th	1990
IPFW	3rd	1992
Penn State	10th	1993
UCLA	17th	1993

== Tournament bracket ==
- Site: Allen County War Memorial Coliseum, Fort Wayne, Indiana

Semifinals
Penn State (3)	9	15	15	15
Ball State (1)	15	7	10	6
UCLA (3)	15	15	15
IPFW (0)	3	8	4

Championship
Penn State (3)	9	15	4	15	15
UCLA (2)	15	13	15	12	12
Third place
Ball State (3)	15	15	15
IPFW (0)	10	12	11

== All tournament team ==
- (Puerto Rico) Ramón Hernández, Penn State (Most outstanding player)
- Byron Schneider, Penn State
- Ed Josefoski, Penn State
- Jeff Nygaard, UCLA
- Erik Sullivan, UCLA
- Paul Nihipali, UCLA
