= 1980 NCAA men's volleyball tournament =

Tournament details
- Dates: May 1980
- Teams: 4

Final positions
- Champions: USC (2nd title)
- Runners-up: UCLA (9th title match)

Tournament statistics
- Matches played: 4
- Attendance: 5,242 (1,311 per match)

Awards
- Best player: Dusty Dvorak (USC)

The 1980 NCAA men's volleyball tournament was the 11th annual tournament to determine the national champion of NCAA men's college volleyball. The tournament was played at Irving Gymnasium in Muncie, Indiana during May 1980.

USC defeated UCLA in the final match, 3–1 (15–7, 6–15, 15–13, 15–8), to win their second national title. This was a rematch of the previous year's final, which was won by UCLA. The Trojans (22–6) were coached by Ernie Hix.

USC's Dusty Dvorak was named Most Outstanding Player of the tournament. An All-tournament team of seven players was also named.

== Qualification ==
Until the creation of the NCAA Men's Division III Volleyball Championship in 2012, there was only a single national championship for men's volleyball. As such, all NCAA men's volleyball programs (whether from Division I, Division II, or Division III) were eligible. A total of 4 teams were invited to contest this championship.

Team	Appearance	Previous
Ohio State	5th	1978
Rutgers–Newark	4th	1979
USC	3rd	1979
UCLA	9th	1979

== Tournament bracket ==
- Site: Irving Gymnasium, Muncie, Indiana

Semifinals
USC (3)	15	15	15
Rutgers–Newark (0)	10	8	7
UCLA (3)	15	15	15
Ohio State (0)	12	9	2

Championship
USC (3)	15	6	15	15
UCLA (1)	7	15	13	8
Third place
Rutgers–Newark (0)	12	9	2
Ohio State (3)	15	15	15

== All tournament team ==
- Dusty Dvorak, USC (Most outstanding player)
- Tim Hovland, USC
- Steve Timmons, USC
- Pat Powers, USC
- Steve Gulnac, UCLA
- Karch Kiraly, UCLA
- Andy Dumpis, Ohio State
