= 2003 NCAA men's volleyball tournament =

Tournament details
- Dates: May 2003
- Teams: 4

Final positions
- Champions: Lewis (Title vacated)
- Runners-up: BYU (3rd title match)

Tournament statistics
- Matches played: 3
- Attendance: 8,157 (2,719 per match)

Awards
- Best player: (Mexico) Gustavo Meyer (Lewis) (Vacated)

The 2003 NCAA men's volleyball tournament was the 34th annual tournament to determine the national champion of NCAA men's collegiate indoor volleyball. The single elimination tournament was played at The Pyramid in Long Beach, California during May 2003.

Lewis defeated BYU in the final match, 3–2 (42–44, 30–27, 30–21, 23–30, 15–12), to win their first national title. However, the NCAA Committee on Infractions ultimately vacated the Flyers' tournament appearance, wins, and championship. The championship was not reawarded to BYU. Lewis (29–6), coached by Dave Deuser, would have become the first non-Division I program to win the NCAA men's volleyball tournament. This was also the first final in the tournament's history where both finalists were from a state other than California. All other finals before had at least one California school participating.

Lewis' Gustavo Meyer was originally named the tournament's Most Outstanding Player. However, this award was revoked when Lewis' title was vacated by the NCAA. Additionally, Meyer and teammates Fabiano Barreto and Ryan Stuntz were all removed from the six-man All Tournament Team.

== Qualification ==
Until the creation of the NCAA Men's Division III Volleyball Championship in 2012, there was only a single national championship for men's volleyball. As such, all NCAA men's volleyball programs, whether from Division I, Division II, or Division III, were eligible. A total of 4 teams were invited to contest this championship.

Team	Appearance	Previous
BYU	3rd	2001
Lewis	3rd	1998
Penn State	18th	2002
Pepperdine	12th	2001

- Note: Lewis' appearance, including their championship, was vacated by the NCAA Committee on Infractions.

== Tournament bracket ==
- Site: The Pyramid, Long Beach, California

Semifinals
–	Lewis (3)	30	29	30	25	15
–	Pepperdine (2)	27	31	27	30	13
–	BYU (3)	36	30	28	30
–	Penn State (1)	34	25	30	26

Championship
–	Lewis (3)	42	30	30	23	15
–	BYU (2)	44	27	21	30	12

- Note: Lewis' wins were all vacated by the NCAA Committee on Infractions.

== All tournament team ==
- (Mexico) Gustavo Meyer, Lewis (Most outstanding player) (Vacated)
- (Brazil) Fabiano Barreto, Lewis (Vacated)
- (United States) Ryan Stuntz, Lewis (Vacated)
- (Brazil) Rafael Paal, BYU
- (United States) Jonathan Alleman, BYU
- (Mexico) Carlos Guerra, Penn State
