= 1985 NCAA men's volleyball tournament =

Tournament details
- Dates: May 1985
- Teams: 4

Final positions
- Champions: Pepperdine (2nd title)
- Runners-up: USC (5th title match)

Tournament statistics
- Matches played: 4
- Attendance: 7,908 (1,977 per match)

Awards
- Best player: Bob Ctvrtlik (Pepperdine)

The 1985 NCAA men's volleyball tournament was the 16th annual tournament to determine the national champion of NCAA men's collegiate volleyball. The tournament was played at Pauley Pavilion in Los Angeles, California during May 1985.

Pepperdine defeated USC in the final match, 3–1 (10–15, 15–10, 15–7, 15–3), to win their second national title. The Waves (25–2) were coached by Marv Dunphy.

Pepperdines's Bob Ctvrtlik was named the tournament's Most Outstanding Player. Ctvrtlik, along with six other players, comprised the All-tournament team.

== Qualification ==
Until the creation of the NCAA Men's Division III Volleyball Championship in 2012, there was only a single national championship for men's volleyball. As such, all NCAA men's volleyball programs whether from Division I, Division II, or Division III, were eligible. A total of 4 teams were invited to contest this championship.

| Team | Appearance | Previous |
|---|---|---|
| Ball State | 8th | 1984 |
| George Mason | 2nd | 1984 |
| Pepperdine | 6th | 1984 |
| USC | 6th | 1982 |

== Tournament bracket ==
- Site: Pauley Pavilion, Los Angeles, California

Semifinals
USC (3) | 15 | 15 | 15
George Mason (0) | 4 | 11 | 10
Pepperdine (3) | 15 | 15 | 15
Ball State (0) | 2 | 2 | 7

Championship
USC (1) | 15 | 10 | 7 | 13
Pepperdine (3) | 10 | 15 | 15 | 15
Third place
George Mason (3) | 15 | 19 | 15
Ball State (0) | 12 | 6 | 5

== All tournament team ==
- Bob Ctvrtlik, Pepperdine (Most outstanding player)
- Bill Yardley, USC
- Rudy Dvorak, USC
- Chao Ying Zhang, USC
- Troy Tanner, Pepperdine
- Matt Rigg, Pepperdine
- Mike Fitzgerald, Pepperdine

== See also ==
- 1985 NCAA Division I women's volleyball tournament
- 1985 NCAA Division II women's volleyball tournament
- 1985 NCAA Division III women's volleyball tournament
