= 1977 NCAA men's volleyball tournament =

Tournament details
- Dates: May 1977
- Teams: 4

Final positions
- Champions: USC (1st title)
- Runners-up: Ohio State (1st title match)

Tournament statistics
- Matches played: 4
- Attendance: 5,152 (1,288 per match)

Awards
- Best player: Celso Kalache (USC)

The 1977 NCAA men's volleyball tournament was the eighth annual tournament to determine the national champion of NCAA men's college volleyball. The tournament was played at Pauley Pavilion in Los Angeles, California.

USC defeated Ohio State in the final match, 3–1 (15–7, 5–15, 15–10, 15–12), to win their first national title. Coached by Ernie Hix, the Trojans finished the season 18–1. This was the first final to feature a school not from the state of California.

USC's Celso Kalache was named Most Outstanding Player of the tournament. An All-tournament team of seven players was also named.

== Qualification ==
Until the creation of the NCAA Men's Division III Volleyball Championship in 2012, there was only a single national championship for men's volleyball. As such, all NCAA men's volleyball programs (whether from Division I, Division II, or Division III) were eligible. A total of 4 teams were invited to contest this championship.

Team	Appearance	Previous
Ohio State	3rd	1976
Pepperdine	2nd	1976
Rutgers–Newark	1st	Never
USC	1st	Never

== Tournament bracket ==
- Site: Pauley Pavilion, Los Angeles, California

Semifinals
Ohio State (3)	15	5	15	16
Pepperdine (1)	10	15	10	14
USC (3)	15	15	15
Rutgers–Newark (0)	11	10	5

Championship
Ohio State (1)	7	15	10	12
USC (3)	15	9	15	15
Third place
Pepperdine (2)	15	15
Rutgers–Newark (0)	8	6

== All tournament team ==
- Celso Kalache, USC (Most outstanding player)
- Marc Waldie, Ohio State
- Dusty Dvorak, USC
- Bob Yoder, USC
- Aldis Berzins, Ohio State
- Mike Buckingham, Ohio State
- Nestor Paslawsky, Rutgers–Newark
