= NCAA men's volleyball tournament =

Annual volleyball competition

- Association: NCAA
- Sport: Collegiate volleyball
- Founded: 1970; 56 years ago
- Division: Division I and Division II
- No. of teams: 12
- Country: United States
- Most recent champion: Hawai'i (3rd title)
- Most titles: UCLA (21)
- Broadcaster: ESPN2
- Website: NCAA.com

The NCAA men's volleyball tournament, officially titled the NCAA national collegiate men's volleyball championship, is an annual competition that determines the National Collegiate Athletic Association (NCAA) championship in American college men's volleyball. It had been the only NCAA championship in the sport from 1970 until 2012, when the NCAA launched a Division III championship.

Unlike most NCAA sports, men's volleyball uses a modified version of the National Collegiate championship format, which means Division I and Division II teams compete against each other in the same tournament.

In the past, schools from the Pacific Coast region have dominated this sport, in particular UCLA with coach Al Scates leading the program to 19 NCAA titles (more than any other coach).

== Competition structure ==
Before the 2011–12 school year (2012 championship), men's volleyball did not have an official divisional structure; even now, that structure is truncated. The National Collegiate Championship remains as the NCAA's top-level championship, but Division III members now have their own championship event.

With the introduction of an official Division III championship, schools in that division are no longer eligible for the National Collegiate Championship. The last exception was Rutgers–Newark, whose men's volleyball program had been a grandfathered scholarship program, and could compete for the National Collegiate Championship through 2014. Rutgers–Newark completed a transition to Division III men's volleyball at the end of that season, and joined the D-III Continental Volleyball Conference effective with the 2015 season.

There are three general regions for men's volleyball: "West", "Midwest", and "East". As of the current 2024 NCAA men's volleyball season, five "major conferences", defined here as leagues that include full members of Division I, represent these regions. The three "traditional" major conferences are the Mountain Pacific Sports Federation (MPSF), Midwestern Intercollegiate Volleyball Association (MIVA), and Eastern Intercollegiate Volleyball Association (EIVA). In the 2018 season, the ranks of "major" conferences expanded to include the Big West Conference, the first Division I all-sports conference ever to sponsor men's volleyball. The Northeast Conference (NEC) became the second D-I all-sports conference to sponsor men's volleyball in the 2023 season.

As of the 2024 season, three Division II conferences sponsor men's volleyball at the National Collegiate level. Conference Carolinas (CC) was the first NCAA conference ever to sponsor men's volleyball as a scholarship sport, having launched its men's volleyball league in the 2012 season. The 2021 season was to have been the first for the Southern Intercollegiate Athletic Conference (SIAC), with six men's volleyball members, but the conference chose not to compete in that season due to COVID-19 issues. CC has had an automatic berth in the National Collegiate championship since the 2014 season, and the Big West received an automatic berth upon the creation of its men's volleyball league. The SIAC received its first automatic berth in the 2024 season. With the NEC having lost three of its original eight men's volleyball members, it will not receive its first automatic bid until 2028, two years after its men's volleyball membership returns to seven. The East Coast Conference began sponsoring men's volleyball in the 2024 season, but started play with only four members, two short of the number needed to eventually receive an automatic berth. Further expansion is expected in the future. In addition to the impending NEC automatic bid, the Great Lakes Valley Conference will add the sport in the 2026 season with seven members (one from the MIVA, five independents, and one new program), putting it in position for an automatic bid in 2028. The MIVA will remain at nine members with the addition of Northern Kentucky for the 2026 season.

Members of the National Association of Intercollegiate Athletics (NAIA), a separate athletics governing body whose members are primarily smaller institutions, regularly play matches against NCAA teams.

Because of the historic lack of an official divisional structure in men's volleyball, four of the five major conferences have members that normally compete in Division II. Before the creation of the Division III national championship, the EIVA had several Division III members, but all of those schools now compete in D-III men's volleyball. The Big West became the first men's volleyball conference to consist entirely of D-I members in the 2021 season; this immediately followed UC San Diego, previously a Big West affiliate in men's volleyball (as well as women's water polo), starting its transition to Division I and fully joining the Big West. The NEC initially announced that it would launch its men's volleyball league in the 2023 season with five full D-I members and transitional D-I member Merrimack, but later announced that it would add Daemen and D'Youville, D-II members that had previously played as National Collegiate independents, as associate members effective with its first season in 2023.

Through the 2013 tournament, each of the three major conferences of that day (MPSF, MIVA and EIVA) received an automatic bid to the Final Four, with one additional at-large bid. The remaining bid was an at-large bid that could be awarded to any team in Division I or II (including Rutgers–Newark). Generally, the best team not receiving an automatic bid (usually from one of the three major conferences) received the at-large bid.

Beginning with the 2014 championship, the field expanded to six teams, with the two new teams being the champion of Conference Carolinas and one extra at-large entry. The new format featured two quarterfinal matches involving the four lowest-seeded teams in the field, with the winners joining the two top seeds in the semifinals. Originally, the quarterfinals were to be played at campus sites, with the Final Four at a separate predetermined site, but it was decided instead to have the entire championship tournament at one site.

With the Big West Conference adding men's volleyball for the 2018 season and qualifying for an automatic tournament berth, the championship expanded to seven teams. The bottom two tournament seeds contested a "play-in" match; from that point, the tournament format was identical to the one used from 2014 to 2017.

The championship expanded to eight teams for 2024, coinciding with the SIAC receiving an automatic bid for the first time, and in 2025 it expanded to nine bids with the NEC getting auto-bid status. In 2024 all teams played at a single site in a pure knockout format, but in 2025 they added an opening round game on a campus site with the quarterfinals, semifinals, and Championship being at one central site.

On September 8, 2025, the first major expansion occurred since the second at-large bid was added back in 2014. There had been public outcry for tournament expansion — namely to add more at-large bids — since the public viewed the fluctuating total of 6-9 teams as too few in the tournament. It was announced by AVCA that the initiative for bracket expansion had been fully funded resulting in a 12 team tournament starting for the 2026 tournament. The format will consist of four non-predetermined regional sites with three teams competing at each site. Two teams will compete in a regional-round with the third team receiving a bye and will compete against the winner in a regional final-round match. Winners from each of the regional final-round sites will advance to compete at the finals site. Put simply, four teams receive hosting duties and a bye to the quarterfinals, while eight other battle in the first round. The winner from there will head to the finals site, where both the semifinals and finals are played.

As stated, the GLVC will not receive an automatic bid until at least 2028, and the ECC will not receive one until the six team requirement is met, plus two years following. This therefore means that seven teams will receive their conference's automatic bids, and an unprecedented five teams will receive an at-large bid for the 2026 and 2027 tournament.

== Division I participation ==
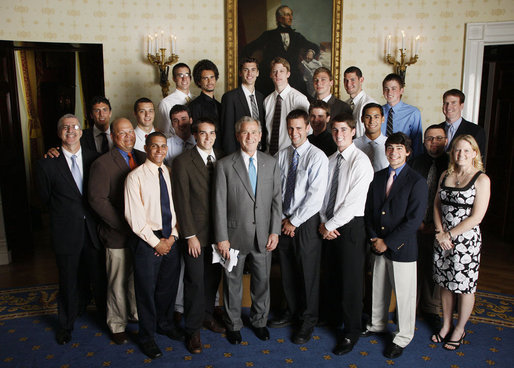
The Pennsylvania State University Nittany Lions men's volleyball team are honored in June 2008 at the White House by United States President George W. Bush for the side's winning the 2008 national championship.

From 1986 to 2021, the number of Division I schools sponsoring men's volleyball fluctuated between 20 and 24 teams. Since that time, the number of such teams has moderately increased, with 26 in 2022 and 29 in each season from 2023 to 2025, with three more D-I schools adding the sport in 2026.

The three newest such schools all started play as D-I members in the 2023 season, during which all were transitioning from D-II to D-I. Merrimack, which started its D-I transition in 2020, added a new team in the 2023 season. The other two, Lindenwood and Queens (NC), already sponsored the sport at the National Collegiate level, and started transitions from D-II to D-I in July 2022.

No traditional D-I conferences sponsored men's volleyball until the Big West Conference added the sport for the 2018 season. The Big West became the first NCAA men's volleyball league to consist entirely of D-I members when UC San Diego, which was one of the six charter members of Big West men's volleyball, began a transition to D-I upon joining the Big West full-time in July 2020. Of the other four major conferences, the only all-sports league is the Northeast Conference (NEC), which started men's volleyball play in the 2023 season with six full conference members and two D-II members as single-sport associates. The Eastern Intercollegiate Volleyball Association (EIVA) and Midwestern Intercollegiate Volleyball Association (MIVA) are volleyball-specific conferences, while the Mountain Pacific Sports Federation (MPSF) is a multi-sport conference of schools whose primary conferences do not sponsor its ten sports. In addition to the 29 D-I schools, 33 Division II schools competed in D-I volleyball during the 2024 season:

- Charleston (WV) competes in the EIVA.
- Lewis, McKendree, and Quincy compete in the MIVA. While all three schools' primary home of the Great Lakes Valley Conference (GLVC) will add men's volleyball in the 2026 season, Quincy is the only one that will compete in the GLVC's first season.
- Concordia–Irvine has been an MPSF men's volleyball member since the 2018 season.
- Daemen and D'Youville, which had previously competed as men's volleyball independents, became single-sport NEC members for the conference's first men's volleyball season in 2023.
- Conference Carolinas, the first all-sports conference in either Division I or II to sponsor men's volleyball, currently has 8 competing teams.
- The Southern Intercollegiate Athletic Conference was to start men's volleyball competition in 2021 with 6 newly launched teams, making those schools the first historically black institutions to sponsor varsity men's volleyball. The SIAC chose not to compete in 2021 due to COVID-19 concerns, delaying the launch of men's volleyball to the 2022 season. During the 2021–22 offseason, the SIAC men's volleyball roster lost one of its intended 6 members when Paine left the NCAA, but kept its membership at 6 with the addition of men's volleyball by incoming SIAC member Edward Waters.
- The East Coast Conference added men's volleyball in 2024, initially with 4 teams.
- Eight D-II schools competed as men's volleyball independents. Three of these are campuses of the University of Puerto Rico. The remaining independents began sponsoring the sport in 2017 or later: Lincoln Memorial (2017), Thomas More (2019 as an NAIA member), Tusculum (2020), Maryville (MO; 2022), and Missouri S&T (2023). Maryville and Missouri S&T, also full GLVC members, will become charter GLVC men's volleyball members in the 2026 season, with Thomas More becoming a GLVC associate.

Four Division II schools launched National Collegiate men's volleyball programs for the 2024 season.

- Full D-II members Dominican (NY), Roberts Wesleyan, and St. Thomas Aquinas (STAC) added programs for the 2024 season. All are playing in the new men's volleyball league of the East Coast Conference, full-time home to Roberts Wesleyan and STAC. The new programs were joined in ECC men's volleyball by American International, which already sponsored the sport. Another D-II member, Alliance, had announced it would add men's volleyball and play in the ECC, but closed before the start of the 2023–24 school year.
- Thomas More, an NAIA men's volleyball school which started a transition to D-II in 2022–23, fully aligned with the NCAA for the 2024 season.

Two schools that played National Collegiate men's volleyball in 2023 did not return for 2024. Full NEC member St. Francis Brooklyn shut down its entire athletic program, and Alderson Broaddus, a D-II member that played as a National Collegiate independent, closed entirely.

Thirteen additional schools, most of them either current Division II members or transitioning to D-II, have either added National Collegiate programs for the 2025 season or will do so in the near future.

- Full D-II members Barry, Catawba, LeMoyne–Owen, and Rockhurst added men's volleyball in the 2025 season. Another full D-II member, Southwest Baptist, will add the sport in the 2026 season. LeMoyne–Owen is playing in its full-time home of the SIAC. Rockhurst is playing as an independent in 2025 before its primary home of the GLVC starts its men's volleyball league in the 2026 season. Southwest Baptist is also a full GLVC member and will start GLVC play upon the team's launch.
- Menlo, Roosevelt, and Vanguard, all also NAIA men's volleyball schools, started transitions from the NAIA to D-II in 2023–24 and intend to fully align with the NCAA for the 2025 season. Menlo and Vanguard joined the MPSF, while Roosevelt is initially playing as an independent before joining GLVC men's volleyball in the 2026 season.
- D-I members Manhattan, Maryland Eastern Shore (UMES), and Northern Kentucky will add men's volleyball in the 2026 season. UMES will become the first Division I historically black institution to sponsor men's volleyball. Manhattan and UMES will play in the Northeast Conference, and Northern Kentucky will play in the MIVA.
- Three other NAIA men's volleyball schools, Jamestown, Jessup, and UC Merced, started transitions to D-II in 2024–25 and plan to align fully with the NCAA for the 2026 season.

Division II does not have a separate national championship, although a D-II rule change that took effect in 2024–25 will allow that division to launch its own men's volleyball championship in the near future should it so desire. Before 2024–25, a D-II championship in a men's sport could not be sponsored unless at least 50 schools in that division sponsored a sport; that number has now been reduced to 35. Should a D-II championship be established, Division I would not have a sufficient number of teams to sponsor its own national championship. Currently, a men's sport must be sponsored by at least 50 schools before a Division I championship can be organized. However, a separate D-I rule provision states that existing National Collegiate or D-I championships in Olympic sports are exempt from minimum sponsorship requirements.

== Champions ==
NCAA Men's National Collegiate Volleyball Championship
Year	Site (Host)	Host Arena	Final			Third Place Final / Other participants		
Year	Site (Host)	Host Arena	Winner	Score	Runner-up	Third Place	Score	Fourth Place
1970; Details	Los Angeles (UCLA)	Pauley Pavilion	UCLA (24–1) ^{1}	3–0	Long Beach State	UC Santa Barbara	2–0	Ball State
1971; Details	Los Angeles (UCLA)	Pauley Pavilion	UCLA (29–1) ^{2}	3–2	UC Santa Barbara	Ball State	2–0	Springfield
1972; Details	Muncie, Indiana (Ball State)	Irving Gymnasium	UCLA (27–7) ^{3}	3–2	San Diego State	Ball State	2–0	UC Santa Barbara
1973; Details	San Diego (San Diego State)	Peterson Gym	San Diego State (21–5)	3–1	Long Beach State	Ball State	2–0	Army
1974; Details	Santa Barbara, California (Note: Mailing address; the UC Santa Barbara campus is outside the city limits in Isla Vista.) (UCSB)	Robertson Gymnasium	UCLA (30–5) ^{4}	3–2	UC Santa Barbara	Ball State	2–1	Springfield
1975; Details	Los Angeles (UCLA)	Pauley Pavilion	UCLA (27–8) ^{5}	3–1	UC Santa Barbara	Ohio State	2–0	Yale
1976; Details	Muncie, Indiana (Ball State)	Irving Gymnasium	UCLA (15–2) ^{6}	3–0	Pepperdine	Ohio State	2–0	Springfield
1977; Details	Los Angeles (UCLA)	Pauley Pavilion	USC (18–1) ^{1}	3–1	Ohio State	Pepperdine	2–0	Rutgers–Newark
1978; Details	Columbus, Ohio (Ohio State)	St. John Arena	Pepperdine (21–4) ^{1}	3–2	UCLA	Ohio State	2–0	Rutgers–Newark
1979; Details	Los Angeles (UCLA)	Pauley Pavilion	UCLA (30–0) ^{7}	3–1	USC	Rutgers–Newark	3–2	Ball State
1980; Details	Muncie, Indiana (Ball State)	Irving Gymnasium	USC (22–6) ^{2}	3–1	UCLA	Ohio State	3–0	Rutgers–Newark
1981; Details	Santa Barbara, California (UCSB)	UCSB Events Center	UCLA (32–3) ^{8}	3–2	USC	Penn State	3–1	Ohio State
1982; Details	University Park, Pennsylvania (Note: Mailing address; the arena lies within the corporate limits of State College.) (Penn State)	Rec Hall	UCLA (29–0) ^{9}	3–0	Penn State	USC	2–1	Ohio State
1983; Details	Columbus, Ohio (Ohio State)	St. John Arena	UCLA (27–4) ^{10}	3–0	Pepperdine	Ohio State	3–1	Penn State
1984; Details	Los Angeles (UCLA)	Pauley Pavilion	UCLA (38–0) ^{11}	3–1	Pepperdine	George Mason	3–0	Ball State
1985; Details	Los Angeles (UCLA)	Pauley Pavilion	Pepperdine (25–2) ^{2}	3–2	USC	George Mason	3–0	Ball State
1986; Details	University Park, Pennsylvania (Penn State)	Rec Hall	Pepperdine (22–7) ^{3}	3–2	USC	Penn State	3–0	Ohio State
1987; Details	Los Angeles (UCLA)	Pauley Pavilion	UCLA (28–3) ^{12}	3–0	USC	Penn State	3–0	Ohio State
1988; Details	Fort Wayne, Indiana (IPFW) (Note: IPFW was split in 2018 into separate IU- and Purdue-affiliated institutions. The athletic program transferred to the new Purdue University Fort Wayne as the Purdue Fort Wayne Mastodons.)	ACWMC	USC (34–4) ^{3}	3–2	UC Santa Barbara	Ball State	3–1	George Mason
1989; Details	Los Angeles (UCLA)	Pauley Pavilion	UCLA (29–5) ^{13}	3–1	Stanford	Penn State	3–0	Ball State
1990; Details	Fairfax, Virginia (Note: Mailing address; the main George Mason campus is outside the city limits in unincorporated Fairfax County.) (George Mason)	Patriot Center	USC (26–7) ^{4}	3–1	Long Beach State	Ball State	3–1	Rutgers–Newark
1991; Details	Honolulu, HI (Hawai'i)	Neal S. Blaisdell Center	Long Beach State (31–4) ^{1}	3–1	USC	IPFW	3–1	Penn State
1992; Details	Muncie, Indiana (Ball State)	John E. Worthen Arena	Pepperdine (24–4) ^{4}	3–0	Stanford	Penn State	3–0	IPFW
1993; Details	Los Angeles (UCLA)	Pauley Pavilion	UCLA (24–3) ^{14}	3–0	Cal State Northridge	Penn State	3–2	Ohio State
1994; Details	Fort Wayne, Indiana (IPFW)	ACWMC	Penn State (26–3) ^{1}	3–2	UCLA	Ball State	3–0	IPFW
1995; Details	Springfield, Massachusetts (Springfield)	Springfield Civic Center	UCLA (31–1) ^{15}	3–0	Penn State	Ball State	3–1	Hawai'i
1996; Details	Los Angeles (UCLA)	Pauley Pavilion	UCLA (26–5) ^{16}	3–2	Hawai'i	Lewis and Penn State		
1997; Details	Columbus, Ohio (Ohio State)	St. John Arena	Stanford (27–4) ^{1}	3–2	UCLA	Ball State and Penn State		
1998; Details	Honolulu, HI (Hawai'i)	Stan Sheriff Center	UCLA (28–4) ^{17}	3–0	Pepperdine	Lewis and Princeton		
1999; Details	Los Angeles (UCLA)	Pauley Pavilion	BYU (30–1) ^{1}	3–0	Long Beach State	IPFW and Penn State		
2000; Details	Fort Wayne, Indiana (IPFW)	ACWMC	UCLA (29–5) ^{18}	3–0	Ohio State	Penn State and Pepperdine		
2001; Details	Long Beach, California (Long Beach State)	The Pyramid	BYU (23–4) ^{2}	3–0	UCLA	Ohio State and Penn State		
2002; Details	University Park, Pennsylvania (Penn State)	Rec Hall	Hawai'i (24–8)†	3–1	Pepperdine	Ball State and Penn State		
2003; Details	Long Beach, California (Long Beach State)	The Pyramid	Lewis (29–6)†	3–2	BYU	Penn State and Pepperdine		
2004; Details	Honolulu, HI (Hawai'i)	Stan Sheriff Center	BYU (29–4) ^{3}	3–2	Long Beach State	Lewis and Penn State		
2005; Details	Los Angeles (UCLA)	Pauley Pavilion	Pepperdine (25–2) ^{5}	3–2	UCLA	Ohio State and Penn State		
2006; Details	University Park, Pennsylvania (Penn State)	Rec Hall	UCLA (26–12) ^{19}	3–0	Penn State	UC Irvine and IPFW		
2007; Details	Columbus, Ohio (Ohio State)	St. John Arena	UC Irvine (29–5) ^{1}	3–1	IPFW	Penn State and Pepperdine		
2008; Details	Irvine, California (UC Irvine)	Bren Events Center	Penn State (30–1) ^{2}	3–1	Pepperdine	Long Beach State and Ohio State		
2009; Details	Provo, Utah (BYU)	Smith Fieldhouse	UC Irvine (27–5) ^{2}	3–2	USC (21–11)	Ohio State and Penn State		
2010; Details	Stanford, California (Stanford)	Maples Pavilion	Stanford (24–6) ^{2}	3–0	Penn State (24–8)	Cal State Northridge and Ohio State		
2011; Details	University Park, Pennsylvania (Penn State)	Rec Hall	Ohio State (26–6)	3–2	UC Santa Barbara (18–15)	Penn State and USC		
2012; Details	Los Angeles (USC)	Galen Center	UC Irvine (26–5) ^{3}	3–0	USC (24–6)	Lewis and Penn State		
2013; Details	Los Angeles (UCLA)	Pauley Pavilion	UC Irvine (25–7) ^{4}	3–0	BYU (26–5)	Loyola Chicago and Penn State		
2014; Details	Chicago (Loyola Chicago)	Gentile Arena	Loyola Chicago (29–1) ^{1}	3-1	Stanford (24–9)	3rd–BYU and Penn State; 5th–Lewis and Erskine		
2015; Details	Stanford, California (Stanford)	Maples Pavilion	Loyola Chicago (28–2) ^{2}	3–2	Lewis (27–4)	3rd–UC Irvine and Penn State; 5th–Hawai'i and Pfeiffer		
2016; Details	University Park, Pennsylvania (Penn State)	Rec Hall	Ohio State (31–2) ^{2}	3–0	BYU (27–4)	3rd–UCLA and Long Beach State; 5th–Erskine and George Mason		
2017; Details	Columbus, Ohio (Ohio State)	St. John Arena	Ohio State (32–2) ^{3}	3–0	BYU (26–5)	3rd–Hawai'i and Long Beach State; 5th–Barton and Penn State		
2018; Details	Los Angeles (UCLA)	Pauley Pavilion	Long Beach State (28–1) ^{2}	3–2	UCLA (26–8)	3rd-Ohio St. and BYU; 5th-UC Irvine and Harvard		
2019; Details	Long Beach, California (Long Beach State)	Walter Pyramid	Long Beach State (28–2) ^{3}	3–1	Hawai'i (28–3)	3rd-Pepperdine and Lewis; 5th-Princeton and USC		
2020; Details	Fairfax, Virginia (George Mason)	EagleBank Arena	Canceled due to the COVID-19 pandemic					
2021; Details	Columbus, Ohio (Ohio State)	Covelli Center	Hawai'i (17–1) ^{1}	3–0	BYU (20–4)	3rd- Lewis and UC Santa Barbara; 5th- Penn State and Pepperdine		
2022; Details	Los Angeles (UCLA)	Pauley Pavilion	Hawai'i (27–5) ^{2}	3–0	Long Beach State (21–6)	3rd - UCLA and Ball State; 5th - Pepperdine and North Greenville		
2023; Details	Fairfax, Virginia (George Mason)	EagleBank Arena	UCLA (31–2) ^{20}	3–1	Hawai'i (29–3)	3rd - Penn State and Long Beach State; 5th - Grand Canyon and Ohio State		
2024; Details	Long Beach, California (Long Beach State)	Walter Pyramid	UCLA (26–5) ^{21}	3–1	Long Beach State (27–3)	3rd - Grand Canyon University and UC Irvine		
2025; Details	Columbus, Ohio (Ohio State)	Covelli Center	Long Beach State (30–3) ^{4}	3–0	UCLA (22–8)	3rd - Hawai'i and Pepperdine		
2026; Details	Los Angeles (UCLA)	Pauley Pavilion	Hawai'i (30–5) ^{3}	3–1	UC Irvine (21–9)	3rd - Ball State and Long Beach State		
2027; Details	Las Vegas (Note: Mailing address; the arena is outside the city limits in the unincorporated community of Paradise.) (UNLV)	Orleans Arena						
2028; Details	Las Vegas (UNLV)	Orleans Arena						

†Vacated due to NCAA violations

=== Team titles ===
School	#	Years won
UCLA	21	1970, 1971, 1972, 1974, 1975, 1976, 1979, 1981, 1982, 1983, 1984, 1987, 1989, 1993, 1995, 1996, 1998, 2000, 2006, 2023, 2024
Pepperdine	5	1978, 1985, 1986, 1992, 2005
Long Beach State	4	1991, 2018, 2019, 2025
USC	4	1977, 1980, 1988, 1990
UC Irvine	4	2007, 2009, 2012, 2013
BYU	3	1999, 2001, 2004
Hawaii	3	~~2002~~, 2021, 2022, 2026
Ohio State	3	2011, 2016, 2017
Penn State	2	1994, 2008
Stanford	2	1997, 2010
Loyola Chicago	2	2014, 2015
San Diego State	1	1973
Lewis	0	~~2003~~

National Championships by school (in California only):
21, 5, 4, 2, 1
National Championships by school (that are in other states): 3, 2

== All-time record ==
as of end of 2026 Tournament

- school indicates schools belonging to Division II, school indicates schools belonging to Division III. (Men's championship is for both Division I and II.)
- school indicates a school that no longer exists, but whose athletic program still exists.
- school indicates a school that no longer sponsors men's volleyball.
- **School** indicates they have won at least one championship.
- Other **bold** indicates most in respective column.

Team	App	C	F	3	4	GP	W	L	Pct	SF	SA	SR	Notes
Army	1	0	0	0	1	5	0	5	.000	0	11	0.000	
Ball State	17	0	0	12	**5**	43	12	31	.279	42	90	0.467	Most semifinals appearances with no championship game appearances.
Barton	2	0	0	0	0	2	0	2	.000	1	6	0.167	
Belmont Abbey	4	0	0	0	0	4	0	4	.000	0	12	0.000	
**BYU**	10	3	5	2	0	19	12	7	.632	41	28	1.464	First champion in first appearance.
Cal State Northridge	2	0	1	1	0	3	1	2	.333	3	6	0.500	
Daemen	1	0	0	0	0	1	0	1	.000	0	3	0.000	
Erskine	2	0	0	0	0	2	0	2	.000	0	6	0.000	
Fort Valley State	3	0	0	0	0	3	0	3	.000	0	9	0.000	
George Mason	4	0	0	2	1	7	2	5	.286	8	15	0.533	
Grand Canyon	2	0	0	0	0	3	1	2	.333	6	6	0.500	
Harvard	1	0	0	0	0	1	0	1	.000	1	3	0.333	
**Hawai'i**	10	3	4	1	1	21	13	8	.619	47	36	1.306	Two consecutive champion, 2002 win and record were vacated.
IPFW	6	0	1	3	2	10	2	8	.200	12	26	0.461	Now Purdue University Fort Wayne. After IPFW was dissolved in 2018, the athletic program was inherited by Purdue Fort Wayne.
King	2	0	0	0	0	2	0	2	.000	0	6	0.000	
Lewis	8	0	1	6	0	11	3	8	.273	17	26	0.654	2003 win and record were vacated.
**Long Beach State**	16	4	7	5	1	38	25	13	.658	78	54	1.444	Two consecutive champion
**Loyola Chicago**	5	2	0	1	0	9	6	3	.667	19	14	1.356	Two consecutive champion
North Greenville	1	0	0	0	0	2	1	1	.500	3	3	1.000	
**Ohio State**	23	3	2	11	**5**	42	17	25	.405	63	84	0.750	Two consecutive champion
**Penn State**	**36**	2	4	**23**	2	56	20	**36**	.357	83	**125**	0.664	
**Pepperdine**	20	5	6	5	0	35	20	15	.571	72	61	1.180	
Pfeiffer	1	0	0	0	0	1	0	1	.000	0	3	0.000	
Princeton	3	0	0	1	0	4	1	3	.250	5	10	0.500	
Rutgers-Newark	5	0	0	1	4	10	1	9	.100	4	28	0.143	
**San Diego State**	2	1	1	0	0	10	7	3	.700	20	12	1.667	
Saint Francis	1	0	0	0	0	1	0	1	.000	0	3	0.000	
Springfield	3	0	0	0	3	9	0	9	.000	1	22	0.045	
**Stanford**	5	2	3	0	0	11	8	3	.727	26	16	1.625	
**UC Irvine**	9	4	1	3	0	17	12	5	.706	43	25	1.720	Two consecutive champion
**UCLA**	32	**21**	**8**	2	0	**73**	**62**	11	**.849**	**195**	63	**3.095**	First champion, four consecutive champion, three consecutive champion (twice), two consecutive champion (twice)
UCSB	8	0	5	2	1	25	11	14	.440	39	38	1.026	
**USC**	16	4	**8**	2	0	30	18	12	.600	67	47	1.426	
Yale	1	0	0	0	0	2	0	2	.000	0	5	0.000	

== Result by school and by year ==
33 teams have appeared in the NCAA tournament since it was first held in 1970. The results for all years are shown in this table below.

The code in each cell represents how far the team made it in the respective tournament:

- CH National Champion
- RU National Runner-up
- SF Semifinals
- QF Quarterfinals Quarterfinals (since 2014)
- ✖ Opening Round (since 2018)
- ~~CH~~ Hawaii and Lewis had championships that were later vacated by the NCAA. These championships and appearances are not included in the total columns.

School	Conference (as of 2027)	#	SF	CG	CH	70	71	72	73	74	75	76	77	78	79	80	81	82	83	84	85	86	87	88	89	90	91	92	93	94	95	96	97	98	99	00	01	02	03	04	05	06	07	08	09	10	11	12	13	14	15	16	17	18	19	21	22	23	24	25	26
UCLA	MPSF	32	31	29	21	CH	CH	CH		CH	CH	CH		RU	CH	RU	CH	CH	CH	CH			CH		CH				CH	RU	CH	CH	RU	CH		CH	RU				RU	CH										SF		RU			SF	CH	CH	RU	QF
Pepperdine	MPSF	20	17	11	5							RU	SF	CH					RU	RU	CH	CH						CH						RU		SF		RU	SF		CH		SF	RU											SF	QF	QF			SF	QF
USC	MPSF	16	14	12	4								CH		RU	CH	RU	SF			RU	RU	RU	CH		CH	RU																		RU		SF	RU							QF						QF
Long Beach State	Big West	16	16	11	4	RU			RU																	RU	CH								RU					RU				SF								SF	SF	CH	CH		RU	SF	RU	CH	SF
UC Irvine	Big West	9	8	5	4																																					SF	CH		CH			CH	CH		SF			QF					SF		RU
BYU	MPSF	10	10	8	3																														CH		CH		RU	CH									RU	SF		RU	RU	SF		RU					
Hawaii	Big West	10	9	6	3																										SF	RU						~~CH~~													QF		SF		RU	CH	CH	RU		SF	CH
Ohio State	MIVA	23	21	5	3						SF	SF	RU	SF		SF	SF	SF	SF			SF	SF						SF							RU	SF				SF			SF	SF	SF	CH					CH	CH	SF				QF	QF		
Penn State	EIVA	36	31	6	2												SF	RU	SF			SF	SF		SF		SF	SF	SF	CH	RU	SF	SF		SF	SF	SF	SF	SF	SF	SF	RU	SF	CH	SF	RU	SF	SF	SF	SF	SF		QF			QF		SF	QF	QF	✖
Stanford	MPSF	5	5	5	2																				RU			RU					CH													CH				RU											
Loyola Chicago	MIVA	5	3	2	2																																												SF	CH	CH									QF	QF
San Diego State	defunct	2	2	2	1			RU	CH																																																				
UC Santa Barbara	Big West	8	8	5	-	SF	RU	SF		RU	RU													RU																							RU									SF					
Lewis	MIVA	8	7	1	-																											SF		SF					~~CH~~	SF								SF		QF	RU				SF	SF					
Purdue Fort Wayne	MIVA	6	6	1	-																						SF	SF		SF					SF							SF	RU																		
Cal State Northridge	Big West	2	2	1	-																								RU																	SF															
Ball State	MIVA	17	17	-	-	SF	SF	SF	SF	SF					SF					SF	SF			SF	SF	SF				SF	SF		SF					SF																			SF				SF
Rutgers–Newark	D3	5	5	-	-								SF	SF	SF	SF										SF																																			
George Mason	EIVA	4	3	-	-															SF	SF			SF																												QF									
Springfield	D3	3	3	-	-		SF			SF		SF																																																	
Princeton	EIVA	3	1	-	-																													SF																					QF		✖				
Grand Canyon	defunct	2	1	-	-																																																					QF	SF		
Army	defunct	1	1	-	-				SF																																																				
Yale	defunct	1	1	-	-						SF																																																		
Belmont Abbey	Carolinas	4	-	-	-																																																			✖			QF	QF	✖
Fort Valley State	SIAC	3	-	-	-																																																						QF	QF	✖
Erskine	Carolinas	2	-	-	-																																													QF		QF									
Barton	Carolinas	2	-	-	-																																																QF		✖						
King	Carolinas	2	-	-	-																																																	✖				✖			
Pfeiffer	defunct	1	-	-	-																																														QF										
Harvard	EIVA	1	-	-	-																																																	QF							
North Greenville	Carolinas	1	-	-	-																																																				QF				
Daemen	NEC	1	-	-	-																																																							✖	
Saint Francis	D3	1	-	-	-																																																								✖

== Past tournaments ==
Historically, California-based universities have dominated the men's volleyball national championship; Loyola Chicago, Penn State, Ohio State, BYU, and Hawaii are the only non-California universities to have won the National Collegiate championship; Lewis also won the championship tournament, but had their victory vacated due to NCAA rules violations. Only seven non-California universities have participated in the National Collegiate championship match (Loyola, BYU, Penn State, Ohio State, IPFW, Hawaii, and Lewis), although other universities such as Princeton and Ball State have participated in the final four. Only five finals have involved two non-California schools: the 2003 final, when Lewis defeated BYU but had its win vacated; the 2015 final, in which Loyola defeated Lewis; the 2016 and 2017 finals, when Ohio State defeated BYU; and the 2021 final, when Hawaii defeated BYU.

Hawaii, UCLA, Southern California, Penn State, Stanford, and Long Beach State are the only schools in Division I to have won an NCAA national championship in both men and women's volleyball. In addition, Stanford (1996–97) and Penn State (2007–08) are the only universities whose men and women's volleyball programs won the national championship in the same academic year.

=== 2011 ===
- May 5, 2011 – UC Santa Barbara def. Southern California, 29–27, 24–26, 25–15, 25–18; Ohio State def. Penn St., 25–18, 24–26, 25–22, 25-23
- May 7, 2011 – Ohio State def. UC Santa Barbara, 20–25, 25–20, 25–19, 22–25, 15-9

Semifinals; Thursday, May 5, 2011; Rec Hall, University Park, Pennsylvania
1	Southern California (1)	27	26	15	18
4	UC Santa Barbara (3)	29	24	25	25
2	Penn State (1)	18	26	22	23
3	Ohio State (3)	25	24	25	25

National Championship; Saturday, May 7, 2011; Rec Hall, University Park, Pennsylvania
4	UC Santa Barbara (2)	25	20	19	25	9
3	Ohio State (3)	20	25	25	22	15

=== 2012 ===
- April 29, 2012 – Selections
- May 3, 2012 – Semifinals (6 p.m./8 p.m. PT) at Galen Center, Los Angeles, California: #1 seed UC Irvine defeated #4 seed Penn State 3-1 (18-25, 25–18, 25–15, 25–19); #2 seed Southern California defeated #3 seed Lewis 3-1 (25-18, 25–12, 18–25, 27–25)
- May 5, 2012 – National Championship (7 p.m. PT) at Galen Center, Los Angeles, California: UC Irvine defeated Southern California 3-0 (25-22, 34–32, 26–24); 9,612 attended (record)

Semifinals; Thursday, May 3, 2012; Galen Center, Los Angeles, CA
1	UC Irvine (3)	18	25	25	25
4	Penn State (1)	25	18	15	19
2	Southern California (3)	25	25	18	27
3	Lewis (1)	18	12	25	25

National Championship; Saturday, May 5, 2012; Galen Center, Los Angeles, CA
1	UC Irvine (3)	25	34	26
2	Southern California (0)	22	32	24

=== 2013 ===
- April 28, 2013 – Selections
- May 2, 2013 – Semifinals (6 p.m./8 p.m. PT) at Pauley Pavilion, Los Angeles, NCAA.com: No. 2-seed UC Irvine defeated No. 3-seed Loyola-Chicago 3–0; No. 1-seed BYU defeated No. 4-seed Penn State 3–0
- May 4, 2013 – National Championship (6 p.m. PT) at Pauley Pavilion, Los Angeles, ESPNU: UC Irvine defeated BYU 3-0 ( 25–23, 25–22, 26–24)
- May 4, 2013 – Game Notes: UC Irvine head coach David Kniffin became just the second coach in NCAA men's volleyball history to win a national title in his first season; 6,295 attended the title game
- May 4, 2013 – All-Tournament Team: Connor Hughes, who had 11 kills in the title game for UC Irvine (Most Outstanding Player); Chris Austin, UC Irvine; Michael Brinkley, UC Irvine Collin Mehring, UC Irvine; Kevin Tillie, UC Irvine; Ben Patch, BYU; Taylor Sander, BYU

Semifinals; Thursday, May 2, 2013; Pauley Pavilion, Los Angeles
1	Brigham Young (3)	25	25	25
4	Penn State (0)	21	16	22
2	UC Irvine (3)	26	25	29
3	Loyola University Chicago (0)	24	18	27

National Championship; Saturday, May 4, 2013; Pauley Pavilion, Los Angeles
1	Brigham Young (0)	23	22	24
2	UC Irvine (3)	25	25	26

=== 2014 ===
- The semifinals and finals 2014 tournament were held in the Gentile Arena in Chicago on the campus of Loyola University Chicago. Two quarterfinal "play-in" matches were held at the Gentile Arena two days prior to the national semifinals, as the 2014 tournament expanded to six teams for the first time ever. A second at-large was added to the field, and the champions of the newly eligible Conference Carolinas men's volleyball division got an automatic qualification. The six teams were seeded according to the same methods used to seed the teams in previous tournaments, with the top two seeds receiving byes into the Final Four, and the third seed facing the sixth seed and the fourth seed facing the fifth seed in the quarterfinals.
- Apr. 29: Quarterfinals (#3 vs. #6 seed; #4 vs. #5 seed)
- May 1: Semifinals (#1 vs. #4-#5 winner; #2 vs. #3-#6 winner)
- May 3: NCAA Championship

Quarterfinals; Tuesday, April 29, 2014; Gentile Arena, Chicago
4	Lewis (1)	25	25	23	19
5	Penn State (3)	27	19	25	25
3	Stanford (3)	25	25	25
6	Erskine (0)	14	16	16

Semifinals; Thursday, May 1, 2014; Gentile Arena, Chicago
1	Loyola (Chicago) (3)	25	22	25	18	15
5	Penn State (2)	20	25	21	25	11
2	BYU (2)	18	25	25	27	12
3	Stanford (3)	25	21	22	29	15

Championship; Saturday, May 3, 2014; Gentile Arena, Chicago
1	Loyola (Chicago) (3)	25	19	25	25
3	Stanford (1)	17	25	19	15

=== 2015 ===
- The semifinals and finals of the 2015 tournament were held in the Maples Pavilion on the campus of Stanford University. Two quarterfinal "play-in" matches were held at the Maples Pavilion two days prior to the national semifinals. The six teams were seeded according to the same methods used to seed the four teams in previous tournaments; the top two seeds received byes into the Final Four, while the third seed faced the sixth seed and the fourth seed faced the fifth seed in the quarterfinals.
- May 5: Quarterfinals (#3 vs. #6 seed; #4 vs. #5 seed)
- May 7: Semifinals (#1 vs. #4-#5 winner; #2 vs. #3-#6 winner)
- May 9: NCAA Championship

Quarterfinals; Tuesday, May 5, 2015; Maples Pavilion, Stanford, California
4	Hawai'i (1)	22	20	25	25
5	Penn State (3)	25	25	17	27
3	Loyola (Chicago) (3)	25	33	25
6	Pfeiffer (0)	20	31	15

Semifinals; Thursday, May 7, 2015; Maples Pavilion, Stanford, California
1	Lewis (3)	25	22	25	25
5	Penn State (1)	20	25	16	20
2	UC Irvine (0)	22	19	17
3	Loyola (Chicago) (3)	25	25	25

Championship; Saturday, May 9, 2015; Maples Pavilion, Stanford, California
1	Lewis (2)	25	23	15	27	21
3	Loyola (Chicago) (3)	21	25	25	25	23

== Broadcasters ==
Date	Network	Location	Play-by-play announcer	Color analyst(s)	Reporter
1972	ABC	Irving Gymnasium (Muncie, Indiana)	Bill Flemming	Keith Erickson	
1973	ABC	Peterson Gymnasium (San Diego, California)	Keith Jackson	Al Scates	
1974	ABC	Robertson Gymnasium (Santa Barbara, California)	Frank Gifford	Don Shondell	
1975	ABC	Pauley Pavilion (Los Angeles, California)			
1976	ABC	Irving Gymnasium (Muncie, Indiana)			
1977	ABC	Pauley Pavilion (Los Angeles, California)	Bob Beattie	Al Scates	
1978	ABC	St. John Arena (Columbus, Ohio)	Bruce Jenner	Chris Marlowe	
1979	ABC	Pauley Pavilion (Los Angeles, California)	Bill Flemming	Chris Marlowe	
1980	ABC	Irving Gymnasium (Muncie, Indiana)	Steve Zabriskie	Diana Nyad	
1981	ABC	UCSB Events Center (Santa Barbara, California)			
1982	CBS	Rec Hall (University Park, Pennsylvania)	John Tesh	Chris Marlowe	
1983	CBS	St. John Arena (Columbus, Ohio)	Gary Bender	Chris Marlowe	
1984	CBS	Pauley Pavilion (Los Angeles, California)	John Tesh	Chris Marlowe	Cathy Lee Crosby
1985	CBS	Pauley Pavilion (Los Angeles, California)	John Tesh	Chris Marlowe	
1986	CBS	Rec Hall (University Park, Pennsylvania)	John Tesh	Chris Marlowe	
1987	CBS	Pauley Pavilion (Los Angeles, California)	Tim Ryan	Chris Marlowe	
1988	CBS	Allen County War Memorial Coliseum (Fort Wayne, Indiana)	Ken Squier	Chris Marlowe	
1989	CBS	Pauley Pavilion (Los Angeles, California)		Chris Marlowe	
1990	CBS	Patriot Center (Fairfax, Virginia)	John Tesh	Chris Marlowe	
1991	CBS	Neal S. Blaisdell Center (Honolulu, Hawai'i)	Verne Lundquist	Chris Marlowe	
1992	CBS	John E. Worthen Arena (Muncie, Indiana)		Chris Marlowe	Ron Squire
1993	CBS	Pauley Pavilion (Los Angeles, California)	Tim Ryan	Chris Marlowe	
1994	CBS	Allen County War Memorial Coliseum (Fort Wayne, Indiana)	Chris Marlowe	Ann Meyers	
1995	ESPN2	Springfield Civic Center (Springfield, Massachusetts)	Chris Marlowe	Paul Sunderland	
1996	ESPN2	Pauley Pavilion (Los Angeles, California)	Chris Marlowe	Heather Cox	
1997	ESPN2	St. John Arena (Columbus, Ohio)	Chris Marlowe	Heather Cox	
1998	ESPN2	Stan Sheriff Center (Honolulu, Hawai'i)	Chris Marlowe	Heather Cox	
1999	ESPN2	Pauley Pavilion (Los Angeles, California)	Chris Marlowe	Heather Cox	
2000	ESPN2	Allen County War Memorial Coliseum (Fort Wayne, Indiana)	Chris Marlowe	Heather Cox	
2001	ESPN2	Walter Pyramid (Long Beach, California)	Chris Marlowe	Heather Cox	
2002	ESPN2	Rec Hall (University Park, Pennsylvania)	Chris Marlowe	Heather Cox	
2003	ESPN2	Walter Pyramid (Long Beach, California)	Chris Marlowe	Heather Cox	
2004	ESPN2	Stan Sheriff Center (Honolulu, Hawai'i)	Chris Marlowe	Heather Cox	
2005	ESPN2	Pauley Pavilion (Los Angeles, California)	Beth Mowins	Heather Cox	
2006	ESPN2	Rec Hall (University Park, Pennsylvania)	Beth Mowins	Heather Cox	
2007	ESPN2	St. John Arena (Columbus, Ohio)	Beth Mowins	Karch Kiraly	
2008	ESPN2	Bren Events Center (Irvine, California)	Beth Mowins	Karch Kiraly	
2009	ESPN2	Smith Fieldhouse (Provo, Utah)	Beth Mowins	Karch Kiraly	
2010	ESPN2	Maples Pavilion (Stanford, California)	Justin Kutcher	Karch Kiraly	
2011	ESPN2	Rec Hall (University Park, Pennsylvania)	Justin Kutcher	Karch Kiraly	
2012	ESPNU	Galen Center (Los Angeles, California)	Justin Kutcher	Karch Kiraly	
2013	ESPNU	Pauley Pavilion (Los Angeles, California)	Adam Amin	Karch Kiraly	
2014	ESPNU	Gentile Arena (Chicago, Illinois)	Sam Gore	Dain Blanton	
2015	ESPNU	Maples Pavilion (Stanford, California)	Paul Sunderland	Dain Blanton	
2016	ESPN2	Rec Hall (University Park, Pennsylvania)	Paul Sunderland	Kevin Barnett	
2017	ESPN2	St. John Arena (Columbus, Ohio)	Paul Sunderland	Kevin Barnett	
2018	ESPN2	Pauley Pavilion (Los Angeles, California)	Paul Sunderland	Kevin Barnett	
2019	ESPN2	Walter Pyramid (Long Beach, California)	Paul Sunderland	Kevin Barnett	
2020	Not held because of the COVID-19 pandemic				
2021	ESPNU	Covelli Center (Columbus, Ohio)	Paul Sunderland	Kevin Barnett	
2022	ESPN2	Pauley Pavilion (Los Angeles, California)	Paul Sunderland	Kevin Barnett	
2023	ESPN; ESPN3 (SAP)	EagleBank Arena (Fairfax, Virginia)	Paul Sunderland; Rigoberto Plascencia	Kevin Barnett; Alex Pombo	
2024	ESPN; ESPN+ (SAP)	Walter Pyramid (Long Beach, California)	Paul Sunderland; Rigoberto Plascencia	Kevin Barnett; Alex Pombo	
2025	ESPN2; ESPN+ (SAP)	Covelli Center (Columbus, Ohio)	Paul Sunderland; Cristina Millán	Kevin Barnett; Paulina García Robles	
2026	ESPN2	Pauley Pavilion (Los Angeles, California)	Anne Marie Anderson	Kevin Barnett	

== See also ==
- NCAA Division III men's volleyball tournament
- NAIA Men's Volleyball Championship
- NCAA Women's Volleyball Championship
- List of NCAA men's volleyball programs
- Pre-NCAA Intercollegiate Volleyball Champions
