= 2008 NCAA men's volleyball tournament =

Tournament details
- Dates: May 2008
- Teams: 4

Final positions
- Champions: Penn State (2nd title)
- Runners-up: Pepperdine (11th title match)

Tournament statistics
- Matches played: 3
- Attendance: 9,003 (3,001 per match)

Awards
- Best player: Matt Anderson (Penn State)

The 2008 NCAA men's volleyball tournament was the 39th annual tournament to determine the national champion of NCAA men's collegiate indoor volleyball. The single elimination tournament was played at the Bren Events Center in Irvine, California during May 2008.

Penn State defeated Pepperdine in the final match, 3–1 (27–30, 33–31, 30–25, 30–23), to win their second national title. The Nittany Lions (30–1) were coached by Mark Pavlik.

Penn State's Matt Anderson was named the tournament's Most Outstanding Player. Anderson, along with six other players, comprised the All Tournament Team.

== Qualification ==
Until the creation of the NCAA Men's Division III Volleyball Championship in 2012, there was only a single national championship for men's volleyball. As such, all NCAA men's volleyball programs, whether from Division I, Division II, or Division III, were eligible. A total of 4 teams were invited to contest this championship.

Team	Appearance	Previous
Long Beach State	7th	2004
Ohio State	15th	2005
Penn State	23rd	2007
Pepperdine	15th	2007

== Tournament bracket ==
- Site: Bren Events Center, Irvine, California

Semifinals
Penn State (3)	30	26	30	30
Ohio State (1)	20	30	22	17
Pepperdine (3)	30	30	30
Long Beach State (0)	26	21	26

Championship
Penn State (3)	27	33	30	30
Pepperdine (1)	30	31	25	23

== All tournament team ==
- Matt Anderson, Penn State (Most outstanding player)
- Max Holt, Penn State
- Luke Murray, Penn State
- Max Lipsitz, Penn State
- Jonathan Winder, Pepperdine
- Paul Carroll, Pepperdine
- J.D. Schleppenbach, Pepperdine
