= 1978 NCAA men's volleyball tournament =

Tournament details
- Dates: May 1978
- Teams: 4

Final positions
- Champions: Pepperdine (1st title)
- Runners-up: UCLA (7th title match)

Tournament statistics
- Matches played: 4
- Attendance: 7,415 (1,854 per match)

Awards
- Best player: Mike Blanchard (Pepperdine)

The 1978 NCAA men's volleyball tournament was the ninth annual tournament to determine the national champion of NCAA men's college volleyball. The tournament was played at St. John Arena in Columbus, Ohio during May 1978.

Pepperdine defeated UCLA in the final match, 3–2 (15–12, 11–15, 15–8, 5–15, 15–12), to win their first national title. Coached by Marv Dunphy, the Waves finished the season 21–4.

Pepperdine's Mike Blanchard was named Most Outstanding Player of the tournament. An All-tournament team of seven players was also named.

== Qualification ==
Until the creation of the NCAA Men's Division III Volleyball Championship in 2012, there was only a single national championship for men's volleyball. As such, all NCAA men's volleyball programs (whether from Division I, Division II, or Division III) were eligible. A total of 4 teams were invited to contest this championship.

Team	Appearance	Previous
Ohio State	4th	1977
Pepperdine	3rd	1977
Rutgers–Newark	2nd	1977
UCLA	7th	1976

== Tournament bracket ==
- Site: St. John Arena, Columbus, Ohio

Semifinals
UCLA (3)	15	15	15
Rutgers–Newark (0)	11	8	8
Pepperdine (3)	9	15	9	15	15
Ohio State (2)	15	1	15	13	12

Championship
UCLA (2)	12	15	8	15	12
Pepperdine (3)	15	11	15	5	15
Third place
Rutgers–Newark (0)	11	12	9
Ohio State (3)	15	15	15

== All tournament team ==
- Mike Blanchard, Pepperdine (Most outstanding player)
- Ron Wilde, Pepperdine
- Jay Anderson, Pepperdine
- Dave Olbright, UCLA
- Sinjin Smith, UCLA
- Steve Salmons, UCLA
- Aldis Berzins, Ohio State
