= 2004 NCAA men's volleyball tournament =

Tournament details
- Dates: May 2004
- Teams: 4

Final positions
- Champions: BYU (3rd title)
- Runners-up: Long Beach State (6th title match)

Tournament statistics
- Matches played: 3
- Attendance: 7,812 (2,604 per match)

Awards
- Best player: Carlos Moreno (BYU)

The 2004 NCAA men's volleyball tournament was the 35th annual tournament to determine the national champion of NCAA men's collegiate indoor volleyball. The single elimination tournament was played at the Stan Sheriff Center in Honolulu, Hawaiʻi during May 2004.

BYU defeated Long Beach State in the final match, 3–2 (15–30, 30–18, 20–30, 32–30, 19–17), to win their third national title. The Cougars (29–4) were coached by Tom Peterson.

BYU's Carlos Moreno was named the tournament's Most Outstanding Player. Moreno, along with six other players, also comprised the All Tournament Team.

== Qualification ==
Until the creation of the NCAA Men's Division III Volleyball Championship in 2012, there was only a single national championship for men's volleyball. As such, all NCAA men's volleyball programs, whether from Division I, Division II, or Division III, were eligible. A total of 4 teams were invited to contest this championship.

Team	Appearance	Previous
BYU	4th	2003
Lewis	3rd*	1998*
Long Beach State	6th	1999
Penn State	19th	2003

== Tournament bracket ==
- Site: Stan Sheriff Center, Honolulu, Hawaiʻi

Semifinals
Long Beach State (3)	30	30	30
Penn State (0)	26	26	26
BYU (3)	30	30	30
Lewis (0)	21	28	21

Championship
Long Beach State (2)	30	18	30	30	17
BYU (3)	15	30	20	32	19

== All tournament team ==
- Carlos Moreno, BYU (Most outstanding player)
- Fernando Pessoa, BYU
- Scott Touzinsky, Long Beach State
- Duncan Budinger, Long Beach State
- Tyler Hildebrand, Long Beach State
- Keith Kowal, Penn State
- Jeff Soler, Lewis
