= 1991 NCAA men's volleyball tournament =

Tournament details
- Dates: May 1991
- Teams: 4

Final positions
- Champions: Long Beach State (1st title)
- Runners-up: USC (10th title match)

Tournament statistics
- Matches played: 4
- Attendance: 5,184 (1,296 per match)

Awards
- Best player: Brent Hilliard (Long Beach State)

The 1991 NCAA men's volleyball tournament was the 22nd annual tournament to determine the national champion of NCAA men's collegiate volleyball. The tournament was played at the Neal S. Blaisdell Center in Honolulu, Hawaiʻi during May 1991.

Long Beach State defeated USC in the final match, 3–1 (15–6, 15–11, 8–15, 15–8), to win their first national title. The 49ers (31–4) were coached by Ray Ratelle. This was a rematch of the previous year's final, won by USC.

Long Beach State's Brent Hilliard was named the tournament's Most Outstanding Player. Hilliard, along with five other players, comprised the All-Tournament Team.

== Qualification ==
Until the creation of the NCAA Men's Division III Volleyball Championship in 2012, there was only a single national championship for men's volleyball. As such, all NCAA men's volleyball programs, whether from Division I, Division II, or Division III, were eligible. A total of 4 teams were invited to contest this championship.

Team	Appearance	Previous
IPFW	1st	Never
Long Beach State	4th	1990
Penn State	7th	1989
USC	11th	1990

== Tournament bracket ==
- Site: Neal S. Blaisdell Center, Honolulu, Hawaiʻi

Semifinals
USC (3)	15	15	12	15
IPFW (1)	9	8	15	3
Long Beach State (3)	15	15	17
Penn State (0)	6	3	16

Championship
USC (1)	6	11	15	8
Long Beach State (3)	15	15	8	15
Third place
IPFW (3)	9	15	15	15
Penn State (1)	15	6	13	3

== All tournament team ==
- Brent Hilliard, Long Beach State (Most outstanding player)
- Brett Winslow, Long Beach State
- Jason Stimpfig, Long Beach State
- Alan Knipe, Long Beach State
- Matt Lyles, Long Beach State
- Bryan Ivie, USC
