= 2006 NCAA men's volleyball tournament =

Tournament details
- Dates: May 2006
- Teams: 4

Final positions
- Champions: UCLA (19th title)
- Runners-up: Penn State (4th title match)

Tournament statistics
- Matches played: 3
- Attendance: 8,916 (2,972 per match)

Awards
- Best player: Steve Klosterman (UCLA)

The 2006 NCAA men's volleyball tournament was the 37th annual tournament to determine the national champion of NCAA men's collegiate indoor volleyball. The single elimination tournament was played at Rec Hall in University Park, Pennsylvania during May 2006.

UCLA defeated Penn State in the final match, 3–0 (30–27, 30–27, 30–27), to win their nineteenth national title. The Bruins (26–12) were coached by Al Scates. This was Scates' final title before retiring in 2012; Scates was with the Bruins for all 19 of their championships.

UCLA's Steve Klosterman was named the tournament's Most Outstanding Player. Klosterman, along with six other players, comprised the All Tournament Team.

== Qualification ==
Until the creation of the NCAA Men's Division III Volleyball Championship in 2012, there was only a single national championship for men's volleyball. As such, all NCAA men's volleyball programs, whether from Division I, Division II, or Division III, were eligible. A total of 4 teams were invited to contest this championship.

Team	Appearance	Previous
UC Irvine	1st	Never
IPFW	5th	1999
Penn State	21st	2005
UCLA	25th	2005

== Tournament bracket ==
- Site: Rec Hall, University Park, Pennsylvania

Semifinals
UCLA (3)	30	31	30
IPFW (0)	25	23	28
Penn State (3)	32	30	31	27	15
UC Irvine (2)	30	23	33	30	13

Championship
UCLA (3)	30	30	30
Penn State (0)	27	27	27

== All tournament team ==
- Steve Klosterman, UCLA (Most outstanding player)
- Damien Scott, UCLA
- Dennis Gonzalez, UCLA
- Dan O'Dell, Penn State
- Matt Proper, Penn State
- Nate Meerstein, Penn State
- Jayson Jablonsky, UC Irvine
