= 2005 NCAA men's volleyball tournament =

Tournament details
- Dates: May 2005
- Teams: 4

Final positions
- Champions: Pepperdine (4th title)
- Runners-up: UCLA (23rd title match)

Tournament statistics
- Matches played: 3
- Attendance: 9,800 (3,267 per match)

Awards
- Best player: Sean Rooney (Pepperdine)

The 2005 NCAA men's volleyball tournament was the 36th annual tournament to determine the national champion of NCAA men's collegiate indoor volleyball. The single elimination tournament was played at Pauley Pavilion in Los Angeles, California during May 2005.

Pepperdine defeated UCLA in the final match, 3–2 (30–23, 23–30, 24–30, 30–25, 15–10), to win their fifth national title. The Waves (25–2) were coached by Marv Dunphy.

Pepperdine's Sean Rooney was named the tournament's Most Outstanding Player. Rooney, along with six other players, comprised the All Tournament Team.

== Qualification ==
Until the creation of the NCAA Men's Division III Volleyball Championship in 2012, there was only a single national championship for men's volleyball. As such, all NCAA men's volleyball programs, whether from Division I, Division II, or Division III, were eligible. A total of 4 teams were invited to contest this championship.

| Team | Appearance | Previous |
|---|---|---|
| Ohio State | 14th | 2001 |
| Penn State | 20th | 2004 |
| Pepperdine | 13th | 2003 |
| UCLA | 24th | 2001 |

== Tournament bracket ==
- Site: Pauley Pavilion, Los Angeles, California

Semifinals
Pepperdine (3) | 30 | 31 | 30
Ohio State (0) | 16 | 29 | 26
UCLA (3) | 30 | 30 | 30
Penn State (0) | 20 | 24 | 27

Championship
Pepperdine (3) | 30 | 23 | 24 | 30 | 15
UCLA (2) | 23 | 30 | 30 | 25 | 10

== All tournament team ==
- Sean Rooney, Pepperdine (Most outstanding player)
- John Parfitt, Pepperdine
- Jonathan Winder, Pepperdine
- Paul Johnson, UCLA
- Jonathan Acosta, UCLA
- Alex Gutor, Penn State
- Mark Greaves, Ohio State
