= 2000 NCAA men's volleyball tournament =

Tournament details
- Dates: May 2000
- Teams: 4

Final positions
- Champions: UCLA (18th title)
- Runners-up: Ohio State (2nd title match)

Tournament statistics
- Matches played: 3
- Attendance: 5,031 (1,677 per match)

Awards
- Best player: Brandon Taliaferro (UCLA)

The 2000 NCAA men's volleyball tournament was the 31st annual tournament to determine the national champion of NCAA men's collegiate indoor volleyball. The single elimination tournament was played at the Allen County War Memorial Coliseum in Fort Wayne, Indiana during May 2000.

UCLA defeated Ohio State in the final match, 3–0 (15–8, 15–10, 17–15), to win their eighteenth national title. The Bruins (29–5) were coached by Al Scates.

UCLA's Brandon Taliaferro was named the tournament's Most Outstanding Player. Taliaferro, along with five other players, comprised the All-Tournament Team.

== Qualification ==
Until the creation of the NCAA Men's Division III Volleyball Championship in 2012, there was only a single national championship for men's volleyball. As such, all NCAA men's volleyball programs, whether from Division I, Division II, or Division III, were eligible. A total of 4 teams were invited to contest this championship.

Team	Appearance	Previous
Ohio State	12th	1993
Penn State	15th	1999
Pepperdine	10th	1998
UCLA	22nd	1998

== Tournament bracket ==
- Site: Allen County War Memorial Coliseum, Fort Wayne, Indiana

Semifinals
–	Ohio State (3)	17	15	15
–	Pepperdine (0)	15	9	10
–	UCLA (3)	15	15	15
–	Penn State (0)	11	8	10

Championship
–	Ohio State (0)	8	10	15
–	UCLA (3)	15	15	17

== All tournament team ==
- Brandon Taliaferro, UCLA (Most outstanding player)
- Angel Aja, Ohio State
- Chris Fash, Ohio State
- Colin McMillan, Ohio State
- Seth Burnham, UCLA
- Evan Thatcher, UCLA
