= 1979 NCAA men's volleyball tournament =

Tournament details
- Dates: May 1979
- Teams: 4

Final positions
- Champions: UCLA (7th title)
- Runners-up: USC (2nd title match)

Tournament statistics
- Matches played: 4
- Attendance: 7,415 (1,854 per match)

Awards
- Best player: Sinjin Smith (UCLA)

The 1979 NCAA men's volleyball tournament was the 10th annual tournament to determine the national champion of NCAA men's college volleyball. The tournament was played at Pauley Pavilion in Los Angeles, California during May 1979.

UCLA defeated USC in the final match, 3–1 (12–15, 15–12, 15–11, 15–7), to win their seventh national title. Coached by Al Scates, the Bruins finished the season undefeated (30–0).

UCLA's Sinjin Smith was named Most Outstanding Player of the tournament. An All-tournament team of seven players was also named.

== Qualification ==
Until the creation of the NCAA Men's Division III Volleyball Championship in 2012, there was only a single national championship for men's volleyball. As such, all NCAA men's volleyball programs (whether from Division I, Division II, or Division III) were eligible. A total of 4 teams were invited to contest this championship.

Team	Appearance	Previous
Ball State	6th	1974
Rutgers–Newark	3rd	1978
USC	2nd	1977
UCLA	8th	1978

== Tournament bracket ==
- Site: Pauley Pavilion, Los Angeles, California

Semifinals
USC (3)	15	15	15
Rutgers–Newark (0)	6	5	7
UCLA (3)	15	15	15
Ball State (0)	3	1	4

Championship
USC (1)	15	12	11	7
UCLA (3)	12	15	15	15
Third place
Rutgers–Newark (3)	15	13	12	15	15
Ball State (2)	11	15	15	7	3

== All tournament team ==
- Sinjin Smith, UCLA (Most outstanding player)
- Steve Salmons, UCLA
- Peter Ehrman, UCLA
- Joe Mica, UCLA
- Bob Yoder, USC
- Pat Powers, USC
- Tim Hovland, USC
