= 1993 NCAA men's volleyball tournament =

Tournament details
- Dates: May 1993
- Teams: 4

Final positions
- Champions: UCLA (14th title)
- Runners-up: Cal State Northridge (1st title match)

Tournament statistics
- Matches played: 4
- Attendance: 11,018 (2,755 per match)

Awards
- Best player: Mike Sealy (UCLA); Jeff Nygaard (UCLA)

The 1993 NCAA men's volleyball tournament was the 24th annual tournament to determine the national champion of NCAA men's collegiate volleyball. The tournament was played at Pauley Pavilion in Los Angeles, California during May 1993.

UCLA defeated Cal State Northridge in the final match, 3–0 (15–8, 15–11, 15–10), to win their fourteenth national title. The Bruins (24–3) were coached by Al Scates.

UCLA's Mike Sealy and Jeff Nygaard were named the tournament's Most Outstanding Players. Sealy and Nygaard, along with five other players, comprised the All-Tournament Team.

== Qualification ==
Until the creation of the NCAA Men's Division III Volleyball Championship in 2012, there was only a single national championship for men's volleyball. As such, all NCAA men's volleyball programs, whether from Division I, Division II, or Division III, were eligible. A total of 4 teams were invited to contest this championship.

Team	Appearance	Previous
Cal State Northridge	1st	Never
Penn State	9th	1992
Ohio State	11th	1987
UCLA	16th	1989

== Tournament bracket ==
- Site: Pauley Pavilion, Los Angeles, California

Semifinals
Cal State Northridge (3)	15	15	15
Penn State (0)	2	5	11
UCLA (3)	15	15	15
Ohio State (0)	4	4	2

Championship
Cal State Northridge (0)	8	11	15
UCLA (3)	15	15	15
Third place
Penn State (3)	7	8	15	16	15
Ohio State (2)	15	15	10	14	10

== All tournament team ==
- Mike Sealy, UCLA (Most outstanding player)
- Jeff Nygaard, UCLA (Most outstanding player)
- Kevin Wong, UCLA
- Dan Landry, UCLA
- (Germany) Axel Hager, Cal State Northridge
- Ken Lynch, Cal State Northridge
- Coley Kyman, Cal State Northridge
