= 2007 NCAA men's volleyball tournament =

Tournament details
- Dates: May 2007
- Teams: 4

Final positions
- Champions: UC Irvine (1st title)
- Runners-up: IPFW (1st title match)

Tournament statistics
- Matches played: 3
- Attendance: 6,884 (2,295 per match)

Awards
- Best player: Matt Webber (UC Irvine)

The 2007 NCAA men's volleyball tournament was the 38th annual tournament to determine the national champion of NCAA men's collegiate indoor volleyball. The single elimination tournament was played at St. John Arena in Columbus, Ohio during May 2007.

UC Irvine defeated IPFW in the final match, 3–1 (30–20, 24–30, 30–23, 30–28), to win their first national title. Both teams made their debut appearances in the title match. The Anteaters (29–5) were coached by John Speraw.

UC Irvine's Matt Webber was named the tournament's Most Outstanding Player. Webber, along with six other players, comprised the All Tournament Team.

== Qualification ==
Until the creation of the NCAA Men's Division III Volleyball Championship in 2012, there was only a single national championship for men's volleyball. As such, all NCAA men's volleyball programs, whether from Division I, Division II, or Division III, were eligible. A total of 4 teams were invited to contest this championship.

Team	Appearance	Previous
UC Irvine	2nd	2006
IPFW	6th	2006
Penn State	22nd	2006
Pepperdine	14th	2005

== Tournament bracket ==
- Site: St. John Arena, Columbus, Ohio

Semifinals
IPFW (3)	27	30	30	30
Pepperdine (0)	30	27	27	25
UC Irvine (3)	30	30	26	30
Penn State (1)	25	22	30	23

Championship
IPFW (1)	20	30	23	28
UC Irvine (3)	30	24	30	30

== All tournament team ==
- Matt Webber, UC Irvine (Most outstanding player)
- Jayson Jablonsky, UC Irvine
- Brian Thornton, UC Irvine
- David Smith, UC Irvine
- C.J. Macias, IPFW
- Colin Lundeen, IPFW
- Paul Carroll, Pepperdine
