= 1984 NCAA Division I women's volleyball tournament =

Volleyball competition

1984 NCAA women's Division I volleyball tournament
- Champions: UCLA (1st NCAA (4th national) title)
- Runner-up: Stanford (1st title match)
- Semifinalists: San Jose State (1st Final Four); Pacific (3rd Final Four)
- Winning coach: Andy Banachowski (1st title)
- Final Four All-Tournament Team: Michelle Boyette (UCLA); Merja Connolly (UCLA); Liz Masakayan (UCLA); Bobbi Broer (Stanford); Kim Oden (Stanford); Susan Compton (Stanford)

The 1984 NCAA Division I women's volleyball tournament was the fourth year of the NCAA Women's Volleyball Championship. It began with 28 teams and ended on December 16 when UCLA defeated Stanford 3 games to 2 in the NCAA championship match.

UCLA claimed the program's first NCAA national title after two previous runner-up finishes. In the deciding fifth game against Stanford, UCLA was down 12-4, but with heroics from Liz Masakayan, the Bruins scored 11 straight points and eventually won the game 15-13.

In the consolation match, Pacific defeated San Jose State to claim third place.

== Brackets ==
=== West regional ===
First Round
Arizona	1
Colorado State	3
San Diego State	3
BYU	0
Pepperdine	2
Southern California	3

Regional semifinal
Stanford	3
Colorado State	0
San Diego State	0
Southern California	3

Regional final
Stanford	3
Southern California	2

=== Mideast regional ===
First Round
Penn State	3
Northwestern	2
Nebraska	3
Pittsburgh	0
Western Michigan	3
Illinois State	1

Regional semifinal
Pacific	3
Penn State	0
Nebraska	3
Western Michigan	1

Regional final
Pacific	3
Nebraska	1

=== South regional ===
First Round
South Carolina	1
Duke	3
Texas	3
Lamar	0
Eastern Kentucky	0
Tennessee	3

Regional semifinal
UCLA	3
Duke	0
Texas	3
Tennessee	1

Regional final
UCLA	3
Texas	1

=== Northwest regional ===
First Round
Fresno State	3
UCSB	1
San Jose State	3
Purdue	1
Oregon	3
Hawaiʻi	2

Regional semifinal
Cal Poly	2
Fresno State	3
San Jose State	3
Oregon	1

Regional final
Fresno State	0
San Jose State	3

== Final Four - Pauley Pavilion, Los Angeles, California ==
Semifinals
Stanford	3
Pacific	0
UCLA	3
San Jose State	0

Finals
Stanford	2
UCLA	3
Third place
Pacific	3
San Jose State	1

== See also ==
- 1984 NCAA men's volleyball tournament
- 1984 NCAA Division II women's volleyball tournament
- 1984 NCAA Division III women's volleyball tournament
- 1984 NAIA women's volleyball tournament
