= 1983 NCAA Division I women's volleyball tournament =

Volleyball competition

1983 NCAA women's Division I volleyball tournament
- Champions: Hawaiʻi (2nd NCAA (3rd national) title)
- Runner-up: UCLA (2nd NCAA (8th national) title match)
- Semifinalists: Stanford (2nd Final Four); Pacific (2nd Final Four)
- Winning coach: Dave Shoji (2nd title)
- Final Four All-Tournament Team: Deitre Collins (Hawaiʻi); Joyce Kaapuni (Hawaiʻi); Kori Pulaski (Hawaiʻi); Patty Orozko (UCLA); Kari Rush (Stanford); Jan Sanders (Pacific)

The 1983 NCAA Division I women's volleyball tournament was the third year of the NCAA Women's Volleyball Championship. It began with 28 teams and ended on December 19 when Hawaiʻi defeated UCLA 3 games to 0 in the NCAA championship match. Hawaiʻi won their second straight title.

In the consolation match, Stanford defeated Pacific to claim third place.

The Final Four was held in Lexington, Kentucky at the Memorial Coliseum. The championship match attendance of 1,812 remains the lowest attendance ever for an NCAA national championship match.

== Brackets ==
=== Northwest regional ===
First Round
California	3
Oregon State	2
Northwestern	0
UCSB	3
San Jose State	1
Cal Poly	3

Regional semifinal
Pacific	3
California	0
UCSB	2
Cal Poly	3

Regional final
Pacific	3
Cal Poly	0

=== Mideast regional ===
First Round
Providence	0
Penn State	3
Illinois State	2
Purdue	3
Nebraska	1
Western Michigan	3

Regional semifinal
UCLA	3
Penn State	0
Purdue	2
Western Michigan	3

Regional final
UCLA	3
Western Michigan	0

=== South regional ===
First Round
Florida State	2
Tennessee	3
Lamar	0
Texas	3
North Carolina	0
Kentucky	3

Regional semifinal
Hawaiʻi	3
Tennessee	0
Texas	2
Kentucky	3

Regional final
Hawaiʻi	3
Kentucky	1

=== West regional ===
First Round
Arizona State	0
BYU	3
Southern California	2
Arizona	3
Colorado State	0
San Diego State	3

Regional semifinal
Stanford	3
BYU	1
Arizona	1
San Diego State	3

Regional final
Stanford	3
San Diego State	0

== Final Four - Memorial Coliseum, Lexington, Kentucky ==
Semifinals
Pacific	0
UCLA	3
Hawaiʻi	3
Stanford	0

Finals
UCLA	0
Hawaiʻi	3
Third place
Pacific	1
Stanford	3

== NCAA Tournament records ==
There are four NCAA tournament records that were set during the 1983 NCAA tournament that have not yet been broken.

- Solo blocks, match (individual record) - Marsha Bond, Kentucky - 11 (vs. Hawaiʻi)
- Solo blocks, match (team record) - 25 (Kentucky vs. Hawaiʻi)
- Solo blocks, tournament (team record) - Hawaiʻi, 35 (11 vs. Tennessee, 10 vs. Kentucky, 6 vs. Stanford, 8 vs. UCLA)
- Hitting percentage, match (team record) - Stanford, .667 (vs. Pacific)

== See also ==
- 1983 NCAA men's volleyball tournament
- 1983 NCAA Division II women's volleyball tournament
- 1983 NCAA Division III women's volleyball tournament
- 1983 NAIA women's volleyball tournament
