= 1976 NCAA men's volleyball tournament =

Tournament details
- Dates: May 1976
- Teams: 4

Final positions
- Champions: UCLA (6th title)
- Runners-up: Pepperdine (1st title match)

Tournament statistics
- Matches played: 4
- Attendance: 5,154 (1,289 per match)

Awards
- Best player: Joe Mica (UCLA)

The 1976 NCAA men's volleyball tournament was the seventh annual tournament to determine the national champion of NCAA men's college volleyball. The tournament was played at Irving Gymnasium at Ball State University in Muncie, Indiana.

UCLA defeated Pepperdine in the final match, 3–0 (18–16, 15–9, 15–11), to win their sixth, and third consecutive, national title.

UCLA's Joe Mica was named Most Outstanding Player of the tournament. An All-tournament team of seven players was also named.

== Qualification ==
Until the creation of the NCAA Men's Division III Volleyball Championship in 2012, there was only a single national championship for men's volleyball. As such, all NCAA men's volleyball programs (whether from Division I, Division II, or Division III) were eligible. A total of 4 teams were invited to contest this championship.

Team	Appearance	Previous
Ohio State	2nd	1975
Pepperdine	1st	Never
Springfield	3rd	1974
UCLA	6th	1975

== Tournament bracket ==
- Site: Irving Gymnasium, Muncie, Indiana

Semifinals
UCLA (3)	15	15	15
Springfield (0)	4	2	5
Pepperdine (3)	15	15	11	8	15
Ohio State (2)	7	11	15	15	0

Championship
UCLA (3)	18	15	15
Pepperdine (0)	16	9	11
Third place
Springfield (0)	4	4
Ohio State (2)	15	15

== All tournament team ==
- Joe Mica, UCLA (Most outstanding player)
- Marc Waldie, Ohio State
- Dave Olbright, UCLA
- Fred Sturm, UCLA
- Denny Cline, UCLA
- Ted Dodd, Pepperdine
- Martin Nora, Pepperdine
