= 1986 NCAA Division II women's volleyball tournament =

American collegiate volleyball tournament

Tournament information
- Sport: College volleyball
- Location: Sacramento, CA
- Administrator: NCAA
- Host: Sacramento State University
- Teams: 16

Final positions
- Champions: UC Riverside (2nd title)
- Runner-up: Cal State Northridge (3rd title game)

Tournament statistics
- Matches played: 16
- Attendance: 3,175 (198 per match)
- MVP: Melanie Jones, UC Riverside

The 1986 NCAA Division II women's volleyball tournament was the sixth annual tournament hosted by the NCAA to determine the team national champions of Division II women's collegiate volleyball among its member programs in the United States.

UC Riverside defeated Cal State Northridge in the final in straight sets, 3–0 (15–9, 15–6, 15–6), to claim the Highlanders' second NCAA Division II national title.

The championship matched was hosted by Sacramento State University in Sacramento, California.

UC Riverside was coached by Sue Gozansky.

== Qualifying ==
The tournament field remained fixed at sixteen teams.

Three teams made their debut in the NCAA Division II tournament: Grand Valley State, Minnesota–Duluth, and Navy.

== Bracket ==
First Round
Cal State Northridge	15	15	15
Florida Southern	11	11	9
Mississippi Women	15	15	15	15
Navy	8	9	17	7
Nebraska–Omaha	15	15	15
New Haven	7	8	2
Ferris State	12	15	10	7
Grand Valley State	15	8	15	15
Minnesota–Duluth	2	5	13
Sacramento State	15	15	15
North Dakota State	15	15	15
Portland State	6	2	10
UC Riverside	15	15	15
Northern Colorado	7	8	3
Central Missouri State	15	15	15
Regis (CO)	11	8	4

Second Round
Cal State Northridge	15	15	15
Mississippi Women	11	5	8
Nebraska–Omaha	12	15	15	15
Grand Valley State	15	10	10	8
Sacramento State	15	8	3	15	10
North Dakota State	13	15	15	10	15
UC Riverside	11	15	13	15	15
Central Missouri State	15	6	15	12	11

Semifinals
Cal State Northridge	16	13	10	15	15
Nebraska–Omaha	14	15	15	13	13
North Dakota State	4	14	8
UC Riverside	15	16	15

Championship; Sacramento, CA
Cal State Northridge	9	6	6
UC Riverside	15	15	15
Third place match
Nebraska–Omaha	15	15	15
North Dakota State	4	10	3

== All-tournament team ==
- Sherry Benson, UC Riverside
- Angela Brinton, Cal State Northridge
- Joyce Jackson, UC Riverside
- Melanie Jones, UC Riverside (Most Outstanding Player)
- Donna Melcher, Nebraska–Omaha
- Allie Nuzum, Nebraska–Omaha

== See also ==
- 1986 NCAA Division I women's volleyball tournament
- 1986 NCAA men's volleyball tournament
- 1986 NCAA Division III women's volleyball tournament
- 1986 NAIA women's volleyball tournament
