= 1992 NCAA men's volleyball tournament =

Tournament details
- Dates: May 1992
- Teams: 4

Final positions
- Champions: Pepperdine (4th title)
- Runners-up: Stanford (2nd title match)

Tournament statistics
- Matches played: 4
- Attendance: 13,102 (3,276 per match)

Awards
- Best player: Alon Grinberg (Pepperdine)

The 1992 NCAA men's volleyball tournament was the 23rd annual tournament to determine the national champion of NCAA men's collegiate volleyball. The tournament was played at the John E. Worthen Arena in Muncie, Indiana during May 1992.

Pepperdine defeated Stanford in the final match, 3–0 (15–7, 15–13, 16–14), to win their fourth national title. The Waves (24–4) were coached by Marv Dunphy.

Pepperdine's Alon Grinberg was named the tournament's Most Outstanding Player. Grinberg, along with five other players, comprised the All-Tournament Team.

== Qualification ==
Until the creation of the NCAA Men's Division III Volleyball Championship in 2012, there was only a single national championship for men's volleyball. As such, all NCAA men's volleyball programs, whether from Division I, Division II, or Division III, were eligible. A total of 4 teams were invited to contest this championship.

Team	Appearance	Previous
IPFW	2nd	1991
Penn State	8th	1991
Pepperdine	8th	1986
Stanford	2nd	1989

== Tournament bracket ==
- Site: John E. Worthen Arena, Muncie, Indiana

Semifinals
Pepperdine (3)	17	15	15
Penn State (0)	16	4	9
Stanford (3)	15	15	11	13	15
IPFW (0)	11	11	15	15	10

Championship
Pepperdine (3)	15	15	16
Stanford (0)	7	13	14
Third place
Penn State (3)	15	15	15
IPFW (0)	4	5	6

== All tournament team ==
- Alon Grinberg, Pepperdine (Most outstanding player)
- Tom Soreson, Pepperdine
- Chip McCaw, Pepperdine
- Dave Goss, Stanford
- Duncan Blackman, Stanford
- David Muir, Penn State
