= Rich Duwelius =

American volleyball player

Personal information
- Born: Richard Lloyd Duwelius; November 23, 1954 (age 71); Benton, Kentucky, U.S.
- Height: 6 ft 6 in (1.98 m)
- Weight: 196 lb (89 kg)
- Education: Ohio State University

Volleyball information
- Position: Middle blocker
- Number: 5

National team
1977–1984	United States
Medal record
Men's volleyball
Representing the United States
Olympic Games
Gold medal – first place	1984 Los Angeles	Team

Richard Lloyd Duwelius (born November 23, 1954) is an American former volleyball player who was a member of the United States national team that won the gold medal at the 1984 Summer Olympics in Los Angeles.

== College ==
Duwelius played volleyball at Ohio State University with future Olympic teammates Marc Waldie and Aldis Berzins, including at the 1977 NCAA Championship. Duwelius graduated from Ohio State in 1977 with a bachelor's degree in chemical engineering.

== Coaching ==
Duwelius was a volleyball coach at Mitchell College in New London, Connecticut, and the Coast Guard Academy, also in New London.

Duwelius was the head coach of the Ledyard High School girls' volleyball team, in Ledyard, Connecticut.

== See also ==
- USA Volleyball
