= 1984 NCAA Division II women's volleyball tournament =

American collegiate volleyball tournament

Tournament information
- Sport: College volleyball
- Location: Portland, Oregon
- Administrator: NCAA
- Host: Portland State University
- Teams: 16

Final positions
- Champions: Portland State (1st title)
- Runner-up: Cal State Northridge (2nd title game)

The 1984 NCAA Division II women's volleyball tournament was the fourth annual tournament hosted by the NCAA to determine the team national champions of Division II women's collegiate volleyball among its member programs in the United States.

In a rematch of the previous year's championship series, hosts Portland State defeated defending champions Cal State Northridge in straight sets, 3–0 (15–7, 15–8, 15–11), in the final to claim the Vikings' first NCAA Division II national title.

Portland State was coached by Jeff Mozzochi.

== Qualifying ==
The tournament field remained fixed at sixteen teams.

Three teams made their debut in the NCAA Division II tournament: James Madison, Northeastern, and Sam Houston State.

== Bracket ==
First Round; Campus sites
James Madison	2	2	9
Portland State	15	15	15
New Haven	14	15	15	15
Northeastern	16	13	6	7
Florida Southern	12	13	9
Sam Houston State	15	15	15
Ferris State	15	11	15	8	15
Tampa	9	15	13	15	5
Northern Colorado	6	9	15	3
Sacramento State	15	15	6	15
Cal Poly Pomona	15	14	15	15
UC Riverside	9	16	13	6
Nebraska–Omaha	11	12	7
North Dakota State	15	15	15
Cal State Northridge	15	15	11	15
Central Missouri State	4	3	15	8

Second Round; Campus sites
Portland State	15	15	15
New Haven	6	6	3
Sam Houston State	15	6	15	15
Ferris State	12	15	3	6
Sacramento State	15	4	15	15
Cal Poly Pomona	13	15	11	10
North Dakota State	15	5	3	8
Cal State Northridge	4	15	15	15

Semifinals; Portland, OR
Portland State	15	15	15
Sam Houston State	4	8	3
Sacramento State	12	10	10
Cal State Northridge	15	15	15

Championship; Portland, OR
Portland State	15	15	15
Cal State Northridge	7	8	11
Third place game Portland, OR
Sam Houston State	6	14	8
Sacramento State	15	16	15

== All-tournament team ==
- Lisa Couch, Portland State
- Theresa Huitinga, Portland State
- Lynda Johnson, Portland State
- Beanie MacLaurie, Portland State
- Shelli Mosby, Cal State Northridge
- Kristy Olson, Cal State Northridge

== See also ==
- 1984 NCAA Division I women's volleyball tournament
- 1984 NCAA men's volleyball tournament
- 1984 NCAA Division III women's volleyball tournament
- 1984 NAIA women's volleyball tournament
