= 1985 NCAA Division II women's volleyball tournament =

American collegiate volleyball tournament

Tournament information
- Sport: College volleyball
- Location: Portland, Oregon
- Administrator: NCAA
- Host: Portland State University
- Teams: 16

Final positions
- Champions: Portland State (1st title)
- Runner-up: Cal State Northridge (2nd title game)

Tournament statistics
- Matches played: 16
- Attendance: 4,937 (309 per match)

The 1985 NCAA Division II women's volleyball tournament was the fifth annual tournament hosted by the NCAA to determine the team national champions of Division II women's collegiate volleyball among its member programs in the United States.

In a rematch of the last two championship series, hosts and defending champions Portland State defeated Cal State Northridge in the final in four sets, 3–1 (15–9, 15–13, 11–15, 15–8), to claim the Vikings' second NCAA Division II national title.

Portland State was coached by Jeff Mozzochi.

== Qualifying ==
The tournament field remained fixed at sixteen teams.

Three teams made their debut in the NCAA Division II tournament: Mississippi Women (MUW), Regis (CO), and St. Cloud State.

== Bracket ==
First Round; Campus sites
Cal State Northridge	15	15	15
St. Cloud State	10	5	4
Cal Poly Pomona	15	15	13	15
UC Riverside	13	9	15	6
Ferris State	13	12	10
New Haven	15	15	15
James Madison	13	15	4	3
Nebraska–Omaha	15	13	15	15
Florida International	12	9	14
Sam Houston State	15	15	16
Mississippi Women	15	10	5	15	15
Tampa	12	15	15	8	6
Central Missouri State	11	15	14	8
Sacramento State	15	3	16	14
Portland State	15	15	15
Regis (CO)	4	0	10

Second Round; Campus sites
Cal State Northridge	15	15	13	15
Cal Poly Pomona	13	9	15	6
New Haven	15	3	11	4
Nebraska–Omaha	9	15	15	15
Sam Houston State	7	4	15	15	15
Mississippi Women	15	15	10	11	9
Sacramento State	0	15	5	8
Portland State	15	6	15	15

Semifinals; Portland, OR
Cal State Northridge	15	16	15
Nebraska–Omaha	12	14	11
Sam Houston State	6	13	10
Portland State	15	15	15

Championship; Portland, OR
Cal State Northridge	9	13	15	8
Portland State	15	15	11	15
Third place game Portland, OR
Nebraska–Omaha	15	15	10	5	15
Sam Houston State	9	2	15	15	11

== All-tournament team ==
- Bonnie Beard, Sam Houston State
- Heather Hafner, Cal State Northridge
- Theresa Huitinga, Portland State
- Lynda Johnson, Portland State
- Kathy Knudsen, Nebraska–Omaha
- Shelli Mosby, Cal State Northridge

== See also ==
- 1985 NCAA Division I women's volleyball tournament
- 1985 NCAA men's volleyball tournament
- 1985 NCAA Division III women's volleyball tournament
- 1985 NAIA women's volleyball tournament
