= 1998 NCAA men's volleyball tournament =

Tournament details
- Dates: May 1998
- Teams: 4

Final positions
- Champions: UCLA (17th title)
- Runners-up: Pepperdine (8th title match)

Tournament statistics
- Matches played: 3
- Attendance: 18,901 (6,300 per match)

Awards
- Best player: Adam Naeve (UCLA)

The 1998 NCAA men's volleyball tournament was the 29th annual tournament to determine the national champion of NCAA men's collegiate volleyball. The single elimination tournament was played at the Stan Sheriff Center in Honolulu, Hawaiʻi during May 1998. With a total tournament attendance of 18,901, this remains this best attended men's volleyball championship.

UCLA defeated Pepperdine in the final match, 3–0 (15–11, 15–11, 15–7), to win their seventeenth national title. The Bruins (28–4) were coached by Al Scates.

UCLA's Adam Naeve was named the tournament's Most Outstanding Player. Neve, along with five other players, comprised the All-Tournament Team.

== Qualification ==
Until the creation of the NCAA Men's Division III Volleyball Championship in 2012, there was only a single national championship for men's volleyball. As such, all NCAA men's volleyball programs, whether from Division I, Division II, or Division III, were eligible. A total of 4 teams were invited to contest this championship.

Team	Appearance	Previous
Lewis	2nd	1996
Pepperdine	9th	1992
Princeton	1st	Never
UCLA	21st	1997

== Tournament bracket ==
- Site: Stan Sheriff Center, Honolulu, Hawaiʻi

Semifinals
–	UCLA (3)	13	15	15	13	15
–	Lewis (2)	15	9	6	15	11
–	Pepperdine (3)	15	15	15
–	Princeton (0)	1	6	4

Championship
–	UCLA (3)	15	15	15
–	Pepperdine (0)	11	11	7

== All tournament team ==
- Adam Naeve, UCLA (Most outstanding player)
- Fred Robins, UCLA
- Brandon Taliaferro, UCLA
- (Puerto Rico) Victor Rivera, Lewis
- Rick Tune, Pepperdine
- George Roumain, Pepperdine
