= 1986 NCAA men's volleyball tournament =

Tournament details
- Dates: May 1986
- Teams: 4

Final positions
- Champions: Pepperdine (3rd title)
- Runners-up: USC (6th title match)

Tournament statistics
- Matches played: 4
- Attendance: 6,925 (1,731 per match)

Awards
- Best player: Steve Friedman (Pepperdine)

The 1986 NCAA men's volleyball tournament was the 17th annual tournament to determine the national champion of NCAA men's collegiate volleyball. The tournament was played at Rec Hall in University Park, Pennsylvania during May 1986.

Pepperdine defeated USC in the final match, 3–2 (7–15, 15–13, 15–11, 5–15, 16–14), to win their third national title. This was a rematch of the previous year's final, also won by Pepperdine. The Waves (22–7) were coached by Rod Wilde.

Pepperdines's Steve Friedman was named the tournament's Most Outstanding Player. Friedman, along with six other players, also comprised the All-tournament team.

== Qualification ==
Until the creation of the NCAA Men's Division III Volleyball Championship in 2012, there was only a single national championship for men's volleyball. As such, all NCAA men's volleyball programs, whether from Division I, Division II, or Division III, were eligible. A total of 4 teams were invited to contest this championship.

Team	Appearance	Previous
Ohio State	9th	1983
Penn State	4th	1983
Pepperdine	7th	1985
USC	7th	1985

== Tournament bracket ==
- Site: Rec Hall, University Park, Pennsylvania

Semifinals
USC (3)	15	15	15
Ohio State (0)	5	10	3
Pepperdine (3)	15	13	15	15
Penn State (1)	11	15	11	12

Championship
USC (2)	15	13	11	15	14
Pepperdine (3)	7	15	15	5	16
Third place
Ohio State (0)	9	1	11
Penn State (3)	15	15	15

== All tournament team ==
- Steve Friedman, Pepperdine (Most outstanding player)
- Rob Scott, Pepperdine
- Matt Rigg, Pepperdine
- Dave Yoder, USC
- Rudy Dvorak, USC
- Adam Johnson, USC
- Chris Chase, Penn State

== See also ==
- 1986 NCAA Division I women's volleyball tournament
- 1986 NCAA Division II women's volleyball tournament
- 1986 NCAA Division III women's volleyball tournament
