= 1984 NCAA men's volleyball tournament =

Tournament details
- Dates: May 1984
- Teams: 4

Final positions
- Champions: UCLA (11th title)
- Runners-up: Pepperdine (4th title match)

Tournament statistics
- Matches played: 4
- Attendance: 9,809 (2,452 per match)

Awards
- Best player: Ricci Luyties (UCLA)

The 1984 NCAA men's volleyball tournament was the 15th annual tournament to determine the national champion of NCAA men's collegiate volleyball. The tournament was played at Pauley Pavilion in Los Angeles, California during May 1984.

UCLA defeated Pepperdine in the final match, 3–1 (15–10, 15–13, 16–18, 15–7), to win their eleventh national title. This was a rematch of the previous year's final, also won by UCLA. The undefeated Bruins (38–0) were coached by Al Scates.

UCLA's Ricci Luyties was named the tournament's Most Outstanding Player. Luyties, along with six other players, comprised the All-tournament team.

== Qualification ==
Until the creation of the NCAA Men's Division III Volleyball Championship in 2012, there was only a single national championship for men's volleyball. As such, all NCAA men's volleyball programs (whether from Division I, Division II, or Division III) were eligible. A total of 4 teams were invited to contest this championship.

| Team | Appearance | Previous |
|---|---|---|
| Ball State | 7th | 1979 |
| George Mason | 1st | Never |
| Pepperdine | 5th | 1983 |
| UCLA | 13th | 1983 |

== Tournament bracket ==
- Site: Pauley Pavilion, Los Angeles, California

Semifinals
Pepperdine (3) | 15 | 15 | 15
George Mason (0) | 12 | 5 | 3
UCLA (3) | 15 | 15 | 15
Ball State (0) | 8 | 4 | 6

Championship
Pepperdine (1) | 11 | 13 | 18 | 12
UCLA (3) | 15 | 15 | 16 | 15
Third place
George Mason (3) | 15 | 19 | 15
Ball State (0) | 6 | 17 | 9

== All tournament team ==
- Ricci Luyties, UCLA (Most outstanding player)
- Doug Partie, UCLA
- Asbjorn Volstad, UCLA
- Roger Clark, UCLA
- Jeff Stork, Pepperdine
- Mike Fitzgerald, Pepperdine
- Ric Lucas, George Mason

== See also ==
- 1984 NCAA Division I women's volleyball tournament
- 1984 NCAA Division II women's volleyball tournament
- 1984 NCAA Division III women's volleyball tournament
