= 1983 NCAA Division II women's volleyball tournament =

American collegiate volleyball tournament

Tournament information
- Sport: College volleyball
- Location: Lakeland, Florida
- Administrator: NCAA
- Host: Florida Southern College
- Teams: 16

Final positions
- Champions: Cal State Northridge (1st title)
- Runner-up: Portland State (1st title game)

The 1983 NCAA Division II women's volleyball tournament was the third annual tournament hosted by the NCAA to determine the team national champions of Division II women's collegiate volleyball among its member programs in the United States.

Cal State Northridge defeated Portland State in five sets, 3–2 (15–6, 15–10, 6–15, 10–15, 15–6), in the final to claim the Matadors' first NCAA Division II national title.

Cal State Northridge was coached by Walt Ker.

== Qualifying ==
The tournament field remained fixed at sixteen teams.

Seven teams made their debut in the NCAA Division II tournament: Air Force, Cal Poly Pomona, Central Missouri State, Jacksonville, New Haven, Tampa, and Wright State.

== Bracket ==
First Round; Campus sites
North Dakota State	5	0	9
Portland State	15	15	15
UC Davis	15	4	15	15
Sacramento State	3	15	8	8
Ferris State	15	15	15
Wright State	11	2	5
Nebraska–Omaha	15	15	15
New Haven	2	12	6
Cal State Northridge	15	13	15	15
Central Missouri State	9	15	10	11
UC Riverside	14	15	11	16	15
Cal Poly Pomona	16	1	15	14	4
Jacksonville	13	15	15	15
Mansfield	15	8	10	3
Air Force	15	15	12	16
Tampa	7	9	15	14

Second Round; Campus sites
Portland State	15	15	15
UC Davis	10	2	13
Ferris State	9	16	19	17
Nebraska–Omaha	15	14	17	2
Cal State Northridge	15	7	12	16	15
UC Riverside	4	15	15	14	12
Jacksonville	11	0	15	16	5
Air Force	15	15	9	14	15

Semifinals; Campus sites
Portland State	15	15	15
Nebraska–Omaha	6	7	13
Cal State Northridge	15	15	15
Air Force	10	8	6

Championship; Northridge, CA
Portland State	6	10	15	15	6
Cal State Northridge	15	15	6	10	15
Third place game Northridge, CA
Nebraska–Omaha	7	7	4
Air Force	15	15	16

== All-tournament team ==
- Heather Hafner, Cal State Northridge
- Theresa Huitinga, Portland State
- Lynda Johnson, Portland State
- Shelli Mosby, Cal State Northridge
- Kristy Olson, Cal State Northridge
- Debbie Wooldridge, Cal State Northridge

== See also ==
- 1983 NCAA Division I women's volleyball tournament
- 1983 NCAA men's volleyball tournament
- 1983 NCAA Division III women's volleyball tournament
- 1983 NAIA women's volleyball tournament
