= Alexandre Kalache (volleyball) =

Brazilian volleyball player

Personal information
- Full name: Celso Alexandre Kalache
- Born: 28 February 1952 (age 74); Rio de Janeiro, Brazil
- Height: 1.86 m (6 ft 1 in)
- Education: University of Southern California

Volleyball information
- Position: Outside hitter
- Number: 8

National team
1972–1978	Brazil
Honours
Men's volleyball
Representing Brazil
Pan American Games
Silver medal – second place	1975 Mexico City	Team
CSV South American Championship
Gold medal – first place	1975 Asunción

Alexandre Kalache (born 28 February 1952) is a Brazilian former volleyball player who played for the Brazilian men's national volleyball team. He competed at the 1972 Summer Olympics in Munich and the 1976 Summer Olympics in Montreal.

== College ==
Kalache played college volleyball for USC, leading them to their first NCAA title in 1977.
