= 1987 NCAA men's volleyball tournament =

Tournament details
- Dates: May 1987
- Teams: 4

Final positions
- Champions: UCLA (12th title)
- Runners-up: USC (7th title match)

Tournament statistics
- Matches played: 4
- Attendance: 11,689 (2,922 per match)

Awards
- Best player: Ozzie Volstad (UCLA)

The 1987 NCAA men's volleyball tournament was the 18th annual tournament to determine the national champion of NCAA men's collegiate volleyball. The tournament was played at Pauley Pavilion in Los Angeles, California during May 1987.

UCLA defeated rival USC in the final match, 3–0 (15–11, 15–2, 16–14), to win their 12th national title. The Bruins (38–3) were coached by Al Scates.

UCLA's Ozzie Volstad was named the tournament's Most Outstanding Player. Volstad, along with six other players, also comprised the All-tournament team.

== Qualification ==
Until the creation of the NCAA Men's Division III Volleyball Championship in 2012, there was only a single national championship for men's volleyball. As such, all NCAA men's volleyball programs, whether from Division I, Division II, or Division III, were eligible. A total of 4 teams were invited to contest this championship.

Team	Appearance	Previous
Ohio State	10th	1986
Penn State	5th	1986
USC	8th	1986
UCLA	14th	1984

== Tournament bracket ==
- Site: Pauley Pavilion, Los Angeles, California

Semifinals
USC (3)	15	9	5	15	15
Penn State (2)	12	15	15	12	9
UCLA (3)	15	15	15
Ohio State (0)	7	10	11

Championship
USC (0)	11	2	14
UCLA (3)	15	15	16
Third place
Penn State (3)	15	15	15
Ohio State	3	6	6

== All tournament team ==
- Ozzie Volstad, UCLA (Most outstanding player)
- Arne Lamberg, UCLA
- Jeff Williams, UCLA
- Chris Chase, Penn State
- Javier Gaspar, Penn State
- Adam Johnson, USC
- Dave Yoder, USC
