= Brent Hilliard =

American volleyball player (born 1970)

Personal information
- Born: Brent William Hilliard; April 13, 1970 (age 56); San Gabriel, California, U.S.
- Height: 195 cm (6 ft 5 in)
- Education: California State University, Long Beach

Volleyball information
- Position: Outside hitter
- Number: 7

National team
1991–1995	United States
Medal record
Men's volleyball
Representing United States
Olympic Games
Bronze medal – third place	1992 Barcelona	Team
World Championship
Bronze medal – third place	1994 Greece	Team
FIVB World Cup
Bronze medal – third place	1991 Japan
Pan American Games
Silver medal – second place	1995 Mar del Plata	Team

Brent William Hilliard (born April 13, 1970) is an American volleyball coach and former player who is the head coach of the San Diego State Aztecs women's volleyball team at San Diego State University (SDSU). He competed in the 1992 Summer Olympics in Barcelona and won a bronze medal.

== College ==
Hilliard played college volleyball at Long Beach State and led the team to its first NCAA Men's Championship title in 1991. He was selected as the Most Outstanding Player of the 1991 NCAA Championship tournament. He also set the NCAA record for most all-time kills with 3,034. He was a three-time All-American, and was named the 1992 National Player of the Year by Volleyball Monthly.

Hilliard was inducted into the Long Beach State Hall of Fame in 1998.

== Coaching ==
Hilliard was an associate coach for women's volleyball at the University of San Diego for two decades, and is currently the head coach for women's volleyball at San Diego State University.

== Awards ==
- Three-time All-American
- NCAA Champion — 1991
- NCAA Championship Most Outstanding Player — 1991
- FIVB World Cup bronze medal — 1991
- Olympic bronze medal — 1992
- FIVB World Championship bronze medal — 1994
- Pan American Games silver medal — 1995
- Long Beach State Hall of Fame — 1998
