= Tom Peterson (volleyball) =

American college volleyball coach

Tom Peterson is an American college volleyball coach. He won two national championships in NCAA Division I men's volleyball with Penn State in 1994 and BYU in 2004. His Penn State team was the first team outside of California to win the men's volleyball national title. He is also the only coach to lead two different schools to men's volleyball championships.

He was formerly the head women's volleyball coach at Salt Lake Community College, Utah State, New Mexico, and Weber State.
