= 1995 NCAA men's volleyball tournament =

Tournament details
- Dates: May 1995
- Teams: 4

Final positions
- Champions: UCLA (15th title)
- Runners-up: Penn State (3rd title match)

Tournament statistics
- Matches played: 4
- Attendance: 7,925 (1,981 per match)

Awards
- Best player: Jeff Nygaard (UCLA)

The 1995 NCAA men's volleyball tournament was the 26th annual tournament to determine the national champion of NCAA men's collegiate volleyball. The single elimination tournament was played at the Springfield Civic Center in Springfield, Massachusetts during May 1995.

UCLA defeated Penn State in the final match, 3–0 (15–13, 15–10, 15–10), to win their fifteenth national title. The Bruins (31–1) were coached by Al Scates. This was a rematch of the previous year's final, won by Penn State.

UCLA's Jeff Nygaard was named the tournament's Most Outstanding Player. Nygaard, along with five other players, comprised the All-Tournament Team.

== Qualification ==
Until the creation of the NCAA Men's Division III Volleyball Championship in 2012, there was only a single national championship for men's volleyball. As such, all NCAA men's volleyball programs, whether from Division I, Division II, or Division III, were eligible. A total of 4 teams were invited to contest this championship. This was the final year of the Third Place Match.

Team	Appearance	Previous
Ball State	13th	1994
Hawaiʻi	1st	Never
Penn State	11th	1994
UCLA	18th	1994

== Tournament bracket ==
- Site: Springfield Civic Center, Springfield, Massachusetts

Semifinals
Penn State (3)	7	15	16	6	15
Hawaiʻi (2)	15	13	14	15	12
UCLA (3)	15	15	15
Ball State (0)	12	9	10

Championship
Penn State (0)	3	10	10
UCLA (3)	15	15	15
Third place
Hawaiʻi (1)	6	15	13	8
Ball State (3)	15	10	15	15

== All tournament team ==
- Jeff Nygaard, UCLA (Most outstanding player)
- John Speraw, UCLA
- Stein Metzger, UCLA
- (Mexico) Iván Contreras, Penn State
- Todd Reimer, Ball State
- (Israel) Yuval Katz, Hawaiʻi
