= 1997 NCAA men's volleyball tournament =

Volleyball tournament season

Tournament details
- Dates: May 1997
- Teams: 4

Final positions
- Champions: Stanford (1st title)
- Runners-up: UCLA (19th title match)

Tournament statistics
- Matches played: 3
- Attendance: 6,237 (2,079 per match)

Awards
- Best player: Mike Lambert (Stanford)

The 1997 NCAA men's volleyball tournament was the 28th annual tournament to determine the national champion of NCAA men's collegiate volleyball. The single-elimination tournament was played at St. John Arena in Columbus, Ohio, during May 1997.

Stanford defeated UCLA in the final match, 3–2 (15–7, 15–10, 9–15, 6–15, 15–13), to win their first national title. The Cardinal (27–4) were coached by Ruben Nieves.

Stanford's Mike Lambert was named the tournament's Most Outstanding Player. Lambert, along with five other players, comprised the All-Tournament Team.

== Qualification ==
Until the creation of the NCAA Men's Division III Volleyball Championship in 2012, there was only a single national championship for men's volleyball. As such, all NCAA men's volleyball programs, whether from Division I, Division II, or Division III, were eligible. A total of 4 teams were invited to contest this championship.

Team	Appearance	Previous
Ball State	14th	1995
Penn State	13th	1996
Stanford	3rd	1992
UCLA	20th	1996

== Tournament bracket ==
- Site: St. John Arena, Columbus, Ohio

Semifinals
–	UCLA (3)	15	13	15	10	15
–	Penn State (2)	13	15	14	15	10
–	Stanford (3)	15	15	15
–	Ball State (0)	6	9	10

Championship
–	UCLA (2)	7	10	15	15	13
–	Stanford (3)	15	15	9	6	15

== All tournament team ==
- Mike Lambert, Stanford (Most outstanding player)
- Matt Fuerbringer, Stanford
- Keenan Whitehurst, Stanford
- Paul Nihipali, UCLA
- Adam Naeve, UCLA
- (Mexico) Ivan Contreras, Penn State
