= 1983 NCAA men's volleyball tournament =

Tournament details
- Dates: May 1983
- Teams: 4

Final positions
- Champions: UCLA (10th title)
- Runners-up: Pepperdine (3rd title match)

Tournament statistics
- Matches played: 4
- Attendance: 3,638 (910 per match)

Awards
- Best player: Ricci Luyties (UCLA)

The 1983 NCAA men's volleyball tournament was the 14th annual tournament to determine the national champion of NCAA men's collegiate volleyball. The tournament was played at St. John Arena in Columbus, Ohio during May 1983.

UCLA defeated Pepperdine in the final match, 3–0 (15–10, 16–14, 15–7), to win their tenth national title. The Bruins (27–4) were coached by Al Scates.

UCLA's Ricci Luyties was named the tournament's Most Outstanding Player. Luyties, along with six other players, comprised the All-tournament team.

== Qualification ==
Until the creation of the NCAA Men's Division III Volleyball Championship in 2012, there was only a single national championship for men's volleyball. As such, all NCAA men's volleyball programs (whether from Division I, Division II, or Division III) were eligible. A total of 4 teams were invited to contest this championship.

Team	Appearance	Previous
Ohio State	8th	1982
Penn State	3rd	1982
Pepperdine	4th	1978
UCLA	12th	1982

== Tournament bracket ==
- Site: St. John Arena, Columbus, Ohio

Semifinals
Pepperdine (3)	15	15	15
Penn State (0)	12	7	9
UCLA (3)	15	15	15
Ohio State (0)	4	5	4

Championship
Pepperdine (0)	10	14	7
UCLA (3)	15	16	15
Third place
Penn State (1)	13	12	15	10
Ohio State (3)	15	15	13	15

== All tournament team ==
- Ricci Luyties, UCLA (Most outstanding player)
- Doug Partie, UCLA
- Wally Martin, UCLA
- Steve Gulnac, UCLA
- Troy Tanner, Pepperdine
- Jeff Stork, Pepperdine
- Edwin Fernandez, Ohio State

== See also ==
- 1983 NCAA Division I women's volleyball tournament
- 1983 NCAA Division II women's volleyball tournament
- 1983 NCAA Division III women's volleyball tournament
