= 1975 NCAA men's volleyball tournament =

Tournament details
- Dates: May 1975
- Teams: 4

Final positions
- Champions: UCLA (5th title)
- Runners-up: UC Santa Barbara
- Third place: Ohio State
- Fourth place: Yale

Tournament statistics
- Matches played: 4
- Attendance: 11,500 (2,875 per match)

Awards
- Best player: John Bekins (UCLA)

The 1975 NCAA men's volleyball tournament was the sixth annual tournament to determine the national champion of NCAA men's college volleyball. The tournament was played at Pauley Pavilion in Los Angeles, California.

UCLA defeated UC Santa Barbara, 3–1 (15–9, 7–15, 15–9, 15–10), to win their fifth national title. This was a rematch of the 1971 and 1974 title matches, both won by UCLA.

UCLA's John Bekins was named Most Outstanding Player of the tournament.

== Qualification ==
Until the creation of the NCAA Men's Division III Volleyball Championship in 2012, there was only a single national championship for men's volleyball. As such, all NCAA men's volleyball programs (whether from Division I, Division II, or Division III) were eligible. A total of 4 teams were invited to contest this championship.

| Team | Appearance | Previous |
|---|---|---|
| Ohio State | 1st | Never |
| UCLA | 5th | 1974 |
| UC Santa Barbara | 5th | 1974 |
| Yale | 1st | Never |

== Tournament bracket ==
- Site: Pauley Pavilion, Los Angeles, California

Semifinals
UC Santa Barbara (3) | 15 | 15 | 15
Yale (0) | 6 | 4 | 6
UCLA (3) | 15 | 15 | 8 | 15
Ohio State (1) | 1 | 11 | 10

Championship
UC Santa Barbara (1) | 9 | 15 | 9 | 10
UCLA (3) | 15 | 7 | 15 | 15
Third place
Yale (0) | 6 | 9
Ohio State (2) | 15 | 15

== All tournament team ==
- John Bekins, UCLA (Most outstanding player)
- John Herren, UCLA
- Joe Mica, UCLA
- Marc Waldie, Ohio State
- Jon Roberts, UC Santa Barbara
- David DeGroot, UC Santa Barbara
