= 2001 NCAA men's volleyball tournament =

Tournament details
- Dates: May 2001
- Teams: 4

Final positions
- Champions: BYU (2nd title)
- Runners-up: UCLA (22nd title match)

Tournament statistics
- Matches played: 3
- Attendance: 9,009 (3,003 per match)

Awards
- Best player: Mike Wall (BYU)

The 2001 NCAA men's volleyball tournament was the 32nd annual event held to determine the national champion of NCAA men's collegiate indoor volleyball. The single elimination tournament took place in May 2001 at The Pyramid in Long Beach, California.

BYU defeated UCLA in the final match, 3–0 (30–26, 30–26, 32–30), to win their second national title. The Cougars (23–4) were coached by Carl McGown.

BYU's Mike Wall was named the tournament's Most Outstanding Player. Wall, along with five other players, comprised the All-Tournament Team.

== Qualification ==
Until the creation of the NCAA Men's Division III Volleyball Championship in 2012, there was only a single national championship for men's volleyball. As such, all NCAA men's volleyball programs, whether from Division I, Division II, or Division III, were eligible. A total of 4 teams were invited to contest this championship.

Team	Appearance	Previous
BYU	2nd	1999
Ohio State	13th	2000
Penn State	16th	2000
UCLA	23rd	2000

== Format ==
The rules were modified this year so that teams needed to score 30 points, rather than 15, to win each individual set. However, teams still needed to win three sets, of five, to win each match.

== Tournament bracket ==
- Site: The Pyramid, Long Beach, California

Semifinals
–	UCLA (3)	30	30	22	30
–	Ohio State (1)	21	20	30	24
–	BYU (3)	30	28	30	30
–	Penn State (1)	28	30	28	26

Championship
–	UCLA (0)	26	26	30
–	BYU (3)	30	30	32

== All tournament team ==
- Mike Wall, BYU (Most outstanding player)
- Hector Lebron, BYU
- Joaquin Acosta, BYU
- Scott Morrow, UCLA
- Adam Naeve, UCLA
- (Puerto Rico) Jose Quinones, Penn State
