= 1996 NCAA men's volleyball tournament =

Tournament details
- Dates: May 1996
- Teams: 4

Final positions
- Champions: UCLA (16th title)
- Runners-up: Hawaiʻi (1st title match)

Tournament statistics
- Matches played: 3
- Attendance: 11,396 (3,799 per match)

Awards
- Best player: Yuval Katz (Hawaiʻi)

The 1996 NCAA men's volleyball tournament was the 27th annual tournament to determine the national champion of NCAA men's collegiate volleyball. The single elimination tournament was played at Pauley Pavilion in Los Angeles, California during May 1996.

UCLA defeated Hawaiʻi in the final match, 3–2 (15–13, 12–15, 9–15, 17–15, 15–12), to win their sixteenth, and second consecutive national title. The Bruins (26–5) were coached by Al Scates.

Hawaiʻi's Yuval Katz was named the tournament's Most Outstanding Player. Katz, along with five other players, comprised the All-Tournament Team. This was the first time the Most Outstanding Player did not come from the championship team.

== Qualification ==
Until the creation of the NCAA Men's Division III Volleyball Championship in 2012, there was only a single national championship for men's volleyball. As such, all NCAA men's volleyball programs, whether from Division I, Division II, or Division III, were eligible. A total of 4 teams were invited to contest this championship. For the first time, a third place match was not held.

Team	Appearance	Previous
Hawaiʻi	2nd	1995
Lewis	1st	Never
Penn State	12th	1995
UCLA	19th	1995

== Tournament bracket ==
- Site: Pauley Pavilion, Los Angeles, California

Semifinals
–	UCLA (3)	15	15	15
–	Lewis (0)	7	8	10
–	Hawaiʻi (3)	15	15	13	15
–	Penn State (1)	9	3	15	7

Championship
–	UCLA (3)	15	12	9	17	15
–	Hawaiʻi (2)	13	15	15	15	12

== All tournament team ==
- (Israel) Yuval Katz, Hawaiʻi (Most outstanding player)
- Stein Metzger, UCLA
- Tom Stillwell, UCLA
- Aaron Wilton, Hawaiʻi
- Jason Ring, Hawaiʻi
- Kevin Hourican, Penn State
