= 1999 NCAA men's volleyball tournament =

Tournament details
- Dates: May 1999
- Teams: 4

Final positions
- Champions: BYU (1st title)
- Runners-up: Long Beach State (5th title match)

Tournament statistics
- Matches played: 3
- Attendance: 13,513 (4,504 per match)

Awards
- Best player: (Puerto Rico) Ossie Antonetti (BYU)

The 1999 NCAA men's volleyball tournament was the 30th annual tournament to determine the national champion of NCAA men's collegiate volleyball. The single elimination tournament was played at Pauley Pavilion in Los Angeles, California, United States during May 1999.

BYU defeated Long Beach State in the final match, 3–0 (15–9, 15–7, 15–10), to win their first national title. The Cougars (30–1) were coached by Carl McGown. BYU won the title in just their first appearance in the NCAA men's volleyball tournament.

BYU's Ossie Antonetti was named the tournament's Most Outstanding Player. Antonetti, along with five other players, comprised the All-Tournament Team.

== Qualification ==
Until the creation of the NCAA Men's Division III Volleyball Championship in 2012, there was only a single national championship for men's volleyball. As such, all NCAA men's volleyball programs, whether from Division I, Division II, or Division III, were eligible. A total of 4 teams were invited to contest this championship.

Team	Appearance	Previous
BYU	1st	Never
IPFW	4th	1994
Long Beach State	5th	1991
Penn State	14th	1997

== Tournament bracket ==
- Site: Pauley Pavilion, Los Angeles, California

Semifinals
1	BYU	10	15	15	15
4	Penn State	15	4	11	5
3	Long Beach State	15	10	8	15	15
2	IPFW	11	15	15	2	13

Championship
1	BYU	15	15	15
3	Long Beach State	9	7	10

== All tournament team ==
- (Puerto Rico) Ossie Antonetti, BYU (Most outstanding player)
- Ryan Millar, BYU
- Chris Seiffert, Long Beach State
- David McKenzie, Long Beach State
- (Puerto Rico) Jose Quinones, Penn State
- Scott Lane, IPFW
