= 1982 NCAA men's volleyball tournament =

Tournament details
- Dates: May 1982
- Teams: 4

Final positions
- Champions: UCLA (9th title)
- Runners-up: Penn State (1st title match)

Tournament statistics
- Matches played: 4
- Attendance: 7,476 (1,869 per match)

Awards
- Best player: Karch Kiraly (UCLA)

The 1982 NCAA men's volleyball tournament was the 13th annual tournament to determine the national champion of NCAA men's collegiate volleyball. The tournament was played at Rec Hall in University Park, Pennsylvania during May 1982.

UCLA defeated Penn State in the final match, 3–0 (15–4, 15–9, 15–7), to win their ninth national title. The undefeated Bruins (29–0) were coached by Al Scates.

UCLA's Karch Kiraly was named the tournament's Most Outstanding Player for the second consecutive year. Kiraly, along with six other players, comprised the All-tournament team.

== Qualification ==
Until the creation of the NCAA Men's Division III Volleyball Championship in 2012, there was only a single national championship for men's volleyball. As such, all NCAA men's volleyball programs (whether from Division I, Division II, or Division III) were eligible. A total of 4 teams were invited to contest this championship.

Team	Appearance	Previous
Ohio State	7th	1981
Penn State	2nd	1981
USC	5th	1981
UCLA	11th	1981

== Tournament bracket ==
- Site: Rec Hall, University Park, Pennsylvania

Semifinals
UCLA (3)	15	15	15
Ohio State (0)	10	12	7
Penn State (3)	15	4	15	6	15
USC (2)	13	15	13	15	11

Championship
UCLA (3)	15	15	15
Penn State (0)	4	9	7
Third place
Ohio State (1)	15	2	9
USC (2)	12	15	15

== All tournament team ==
- Karch Kiraly, UCLA (Most outstanding player)
- Dave Saunders, UCLA
- Doug Partie, UCLA
- Dave Mochalski, UCLA
- Steve Hunkins, Penn State
- Jeff Johnson, Penn State
- Bill Stetson, USC
