= Carlos Guerra =

Mexican volleyball player (born 1981)

Personal information
- Nationality: Mexican
- Born: 3 August 1981 (age 45); Tampico, México
- Hometown: Radelfingen, Switzerland
- Height: 1.96 m (6 ft 5 in)
- Weight: 95 kg (209 lb)
- Spike: 348 cm (137 in)
- Block: 335 cm (132 in)
- Education: Penn State University

Volleyball information
- Position: Wing Spiker / Outside Hitter
- Current club: (Switzerland) Volero Aarberg
- Number: 9

Career
Years
2000-03
2003-04
2004-2005, 2005-06
2006
2006-07
2007-08, 2008-09
2009-2010, 2010-11
2011-12, 2012-13, 2015-16
2016-17
2020-2021
Teams
(United States) Penn State Volleyball
(Greece) A.E.K Athens
(Switzerland) SEAT Volley Näfels
(Puerto Rico) Leones de Ponce
(Spain) Numancia Soria
(Switzerland) Volley Münsingen
(Switzerland) LUC Volleyball Lausanne
(Switzerland) Chênois Genève Volleyball
(Switzerland) Volley Schönenwerd
(Switzerland) Volero Aarberg

National team
1997 - present	Mexico

Carlos Guerra (born 3 August 1981) is a Mexican male volleyball player. He was part of the Mexico men's national volleyball team at the 2010 FIVB Volleyball Men's World Championship in Italy, at the 2014 FIVB Volleyball Men's World Championship in Poland and at the Volleyball at the 2016 Summer Olympics in Rio. He currently plays for Volero Aarberg.

== Clubs ==
- A.E.K Athens (2003)
- SEAT Volley Näfels (2004)
- Leones de Ponce (2006)
- Numancia Soria (2006)
- Volley Münsingen (2014)
- LUC Volleyball Lausanne (2009)
- Chênois Genève Volleyball (2011)
- Volley Schönenwerd (2016)
- Volero Aarberg (2020)

== See also ==
- List of Pennsylvania State University Olympians
