= Aldis Berzins =

Latvian-American volleyball player (born 1956)

Personal information
- Full name: Aldis Imants Berzins
- Born: October 3, 1956 (age 70); Wilmington, Delaware, U.S.
- Height: 188 cm (6 ft 2 in)
- Education: Ohio State University

Volleyball information
- Position: Outside hitter
- Number: 12

National team
1977–1985	United States
Medal record
Men's volleyball
Representing the United States
Olympic Games
Gold medal – first place	1984 Los Angeles	Team
FIVB World Cup
Gold medal – first place	1985 Japan

Aldis Imants Bērziņš (born October 3, 1956) is a Latvian-American former volleyball player who was a member of the United States national team that won the gold medal at the 1984 Summer Olympics in Los Angeles. He also won a gold medal at the 1985 FIVB World Cup in Japan, where he was selected as the best digger.

== College ==
Bērziņš was a star outside hitter on the Ohio State volleyball team. He played with future Olympic teammates Rich Duwelius and Marc Waldie at Ohio State. In those years, he led the Buckeyes to four straight Midwestern Intercollegiate Volleyball Association (MIVA) championships and four appearances in the NCAA Final Four. He graduated from Ohio State in 1978 with a bachelor's degree in astronomy.

Bērziņš was inducted into the Ohio State University Athletics Hall of Fame in 2002.

== Awards ==
- Three-time All-MIVA first-team selection
- Olympic gold medal — 1984
- FIVB World Cup gold medal — 1985
- FIVB World Cup All-Tournament selection — 1985
- Ohio State University Athletics Hall of Fame — 2002

== Coaching ==
Bērziņš has been head coach of the men's volleyball program at Stevenson University since October 2016.

== Personal life ==
Bērziņš has worked as the Director of Information Technology for the Special Olympics.

Bērziņš and his wife, Mara, have three sons, Kris, Mik, and Dainis, all of whom have played volleyball. Mik was on the first NCAA National Championship team for Ohio State in 2011, and Dainis was on the National Championship team of Loyola University Chicago in 2014. Kris played volleyball professionally in Europe.

== See also ==
- USA Volleyball
