= Marc Waldie =

American volleyball player

Personal information
- Born: Marc Robert Waldie; August 24, 1955 (age 71); Wichita, Kansas, U.S.
- Height: 193 cm (6 ft 4 in)
- Education: Ohio State University

Volleyball information
- Position: Middle blocker
- Number: 9

National team
1976–1984	United States
Medal record
Men's volleyball
Representing the United States
Olympic Games
Gold medal – first place	1984 Los Angeles	Team

Marc Robert Waldie (born August 24, 1955) is an American former volleyball player. He was a member of the United States national team that won the gold medal at the 1984 Summer Olympics in Los Angeles.

== College ==
Waldie played volleyball for Ohio State University. He played with future Olympic teammates Rich Duwelius and Aldis Berzins at Ohio State. He helped the Buckeyes reach the 1977 NCAA Championship final. He was a three-time All-American.

Waldie was inducted into the Ohio State University Athletics Hall of Fame in 2001.

== Awards ==
- Three-time All-American
- Olympic gold medal — 1984
- Ohio State University Athletics Hall of Fame — 2001

== See also ==
- USA Volleyball
