= Bryan Ivie =

American volleyball player (born 1969)

Personal information
- Full name: Bryan Eric Ivie
- Nickname: Poison
- Born: May 5, 1969 (age 57); Torrance, California, U.S.
- Height: 6 ft 7 in (201 cm)
- Weight: 216 lb (98 kg)
- Education: University of Southern California

Volleyball information
- Position: Middle blocker
- Number: 5 (national team)

National team
1989–1996	United States
Medal record
Men's volleyball
Representing the United States
Olympic Games
Bronze medal – third place	1992 Barcelona	Indoor
World Championship
Bronze medal – third place	1994 Greece	Indoor
FIVB World Cup
Bronze medal – third place	1991 Japan
Pan American Games
Silver medal – second place	1995 Mar del Plata	Indoor

Bryan Eric Ivie (born May 5, 1969) is an American former volleyball player and two-time Olympian. Ivie was a member of the United States national volleyball team that won the bronze medal at the 1992 Summer Olympics in Barcelona. He also competed at the 1996 Summer Olympics in Atlanta. He was a middle blocker.

Ivie became the team captain of the national team in 1993. He was named Male Volleyball Athlete of the Year in 1992 and 1993 by the United States Olympic Committee.

== Early life ==
Ivie graduated from Mira Costa High School in Manhattan Beach, California in 1987. He started playing volleyball as a junior in high school.

== College ==
Ivie played volleyball at the University of Southern California, where he led the Trojans to NCAA Championship titles in 1988 and 1990. In 1990, he was selected as National Player of the Year and the Most Outstanding Player of the NCAA Championship tournament. He had a total of 2,380 kills with the Trojans. He was twice selected as an All-American and National Player of the Year.

== Beach volleyball ==
From 1993 to 2000, Ivie played professional beach volleyball and won $74,000 in prizes.

== Awards ==
- Two-time All-American
- Two-time NCAA National Player of the Year
- Two-time NCAA Champion — 1988, 1990
- NCAA Championship Most Outstanding Player — 1990
- FIVB World Cup bronze medal — 1991
- Olympic bronze medal — 1992
- Two-time USOC Male Volleyball Athlete of the Year — 1992, 1993
- FIVB World Championship bronze medal — 1994
- Pan American Games silver medal — 1995
