= 1989 NCAA men's volleyball tournament =

Tournament details
- Dates: May 1989
- Teams: 4

Final positions
- Champions: UCLA (13th title)
- Runners-up: Stanford (1st title match)

Tournament statistics
- Matches played: 4
- Attendance: 9,436 (2,359 per match)

Awards
- Best player: Matt Sonnichsen (UCLA)

The 1989 NCAA men's volleyball tournament was the 20th annual tournament to determine the national champion of NCAA men's collegiate volleyball. The tournament was played at Pauley Pavilion in Los Angeles, California during May 1989.

UCLA defeated Stanford in the final match, 3–1 (15–1, 15–13, 4–15, 15–12), to win their 13th national title. The Bruins (29–5) were coached by Al Scates.

UCLA's Matt Sonnichsen was named the tournament's Most Outstanding Player. Sonnichsen, along with five other players, also comprised the All-tournament team.

== Qualification ==
Until the creation of the NCAA Men's Division III Volleyball Championship in 2012, there was only a single national championship for men's volleyball. As such, all NCAA men's volleyball programs, whether from Division I, Division II, or Division III, were eligible. A total of 4 teams were invited to contest this championship.

Team	Appearance	Previous
Ball State	10th	1988
Penn State	6th	1987
Stanford	1st	Never
UCLA	15th	1987

== Tournament bracket ==
- Site: Pauley Pavilion, Los Angeles, California

Semifinals
UCLA (3)	15	15	15
Penn State (0)	6	4	9
Stanford (3)	15	8	15	15
Ball State (1)	13	15	9	13

Championship
UCLA (3)	15	15	4	15
Stanford (1)	1	13	15	12
Third place
Penn State (3)	15	15	15
Ball State (0)	13	11	6

== All tournament team ==
- Matt Sonnichsen, UCLA (Most outstanding player)
- Anthony Curci, UCLA
- Trevor Schirman, UCLA
- Matt Whitaker, UCLA
- Scott Fortune, Stanford
- Dan Hanan, Stanford
- Chris Chase, Penn State
