= Marv Dunphy =

American volleyball player and coach

Personal information
- Full name: Marvin Alex Dunphy
- Born: c. 1948 (age 77–78); United States
- Hometown: Malibu, California, U.S.
- Education: Pepperdine University (BS), University of Southern California (MA), Brigham Young University (PhD)

Coaching information
Previous teams coached
Years	Teams
1985–1988	United States

Best results
Years	Location	Result
1988	1988 Olympics	Gold

Marvin Alex Dunphy (born 1948) is an American former volleyball player and head coach. He is most known for his time at Pepperdine University. During his tenure, Pepperdine won four NCAA Division I Championships. His career record is 612–277 (.688). He also led the United States men's national volleyball team to the gold medal in the 1988 Summer Olympics. He retired from coaching in 2017.

== Pepperdine career ==
Dunphy became head coach of the Pepperdine men's volleyball team in 1977. As head coach, he led the Waves to Championship titles in 1978, 1985, 1992, and 2005. Under his tutelage, 45 Pepperdine Waves have earned All-American awards, and six of his players have earned National Player of the Year honors. Eleven of Dunphy's players have gone on to compete in the Olympics. With a career spanning four decades as head coach, he retired in 2017.

== National team ==
From 1985 to 1988, Dunphy was the head coach of the United States men's national volleyball team. Under his leadership, the Americans maintained a number one ranking and achieved an impressive overall record of 197–31. Dunphy's squad won every major international event, including the 1985 FIVB World Cup, the 1986 FIVB World Championship, the 1987 Pan American Games, and the 1988 Olympics in Seoul. In 1988, Dunphy was the recipient of the Coach of the Year Award from the Fédération Internationale de Volleyball (FIVB). He served as the technical advisor for the 1996 and 2004 Olympic teams, was an assistant coach for the 2000 Olympic team, and has been a consultant coach at the 2008 Beijing Olympics, 2012 London Olympics, 2016 Rio Olympics, and 2020 (2021) Tokyo Olympics.

== Hall of Fame ==
In 1994, Dunphy was inducted into the International Volleyball Hall of Fame. In 2009, he was inducted into the AVCA Hall of Fame. In 2010, he was inducted into the Pepperdine Hall of Fame. In 2017, he was inducted into the Southern California Indoor Volleyball Hall of Fame.

== Education ==
Dunphy earned an undergraduate degree from Pepperdine University, has a master's degree from the University of Southern California, and completed his doctorate at Brigham Young University. Dunphy is a Professor Emeritus of Sports Medicine in the Natural Science Division at Pepperdine Seaver College.

== Personal life ==
Dunphy is a veteran of the Vietnam War.
