= USC Trojans men's volleyball =

American college volleyball team

- University: University of Southern California
- Head coach: Jeff Nygaard (1st season)
- Conference: MPSF
- Location: Los Angeles, California, US
- Home arena: Galen Center (capacity: 10,258)
- Nickname: Trojans
- Colors: Cardinal and gold

NCAA tournament champion
- 1977, 1980, 1988, 1990

NCAA tournament runner-up
- 1979, 1981, 1985, 1986, 1987, 1991, 2009, 2012

NCAA tournament appearance
- 1977, 1979, 1980, 1981, 1982, 1985, 1986, 1987, 1988, 1990, 1991, 2009, 2011, 2012, 2019, 2026

Conference tournament champion
- 1991, 2009

USC Trojans men's volleyball is a collegiate volleyball team that represents the University of Southern California (USC). The team participates as a member of the Mountain Pacific Sports Federation (MPSF), an athletic conference in Division I of the National Collegiate Athletic Association (NCAA). The program began in 1970 and first awarded schlorships during the 1976–77 season. The program has won the NCAA Men's Volleyball Championship four times, and placed second seven times. Home games are played at Galen Center on the USC campus in Los Angeles, California.

== Venues ==
The North Gym, located in the USC Physical Education Building, was the team's home court from 1970 until 1988. From 1989 to 2006, the North Gym and the Lyon Center split time as the team's home court. In 2007, the team moved to the Galen Center as its home court, but uses the old venues if the Galen Center is reserved for other events.
