= 1974 NCAA men's volleyball tournament =

Tournament details
- Dates: May 1974
- Teams: 4

Final positions
- Champions: UCLA (4th title)
- Runners-up: UC Santa Barbara
- Third place: Ball State
- Fourth place: Springfield

Tournament statistics
- Matches played: 4
- Attendance: 4,842 (1,211 per match)

Awards
- Best player: Bob Leonard (UCLA)

The 1974 NCAA men's volleyball tournament was the fifth annual tournament to determine the national champion of NCAA men's college volleyball. The tournament was played at Robertson Gymnasium in Santa Barbara, California. The previous tournament format of round robin play for seeding followed by a single-elimination tournament was dropped in favor of going directly to a single-elimination bracket. The tournament field remained fixed at 4 teams.

== Qualification ==
Until the creation of the NCAA Men's Division III Volleyball Championship in 2012, there was only a single national championship for men's volleyball. As such, all NCAA men's volleyball programs (whether from Division I, Division II, or Division III) were eligible. A total of 4 teams were invited to contest this championship.

== Tournament play ==
The 1974 NCAA men's volleyball tournament was held on the UC Santa Barbara campus, and UC Santa Barbara was the heavy favorite to win it. UCLA made it to the NCAA tournament by upsetting Southern Cal in their district playoffs. The previous final four tournament format of round robin play for seeding followed by a single-elimination playoff was dropped in 1974 in favor of going directly to a single-elimination playoff. The tournament field remained limited to four teams. In the semi-finals UCLA defeated Ball State in straight sets while UCSB defeated Springfield in straight sets, setting up a championship final between perennial power UCLA against top ranked UCSB.

The championship match was a back and forth affair, with UCSB beating the Bruins in Games 1 and 3, while UCLA took games 2 and 4. Many of the Bruin kills were coming from a high tempo inside attack, with UCLA's Bob Leonard taking quick sets off of setter Jim Menges. In the game five clincher the Gauchos were up 6-1 before the Bruins rallied back with six straight points to lead 7–6. The two teams kept exchanging kills, with UCLA maintaining a slim lead to take the championship by the margin: 10–15, 15–8, 10–15, 15–11, 15–12. Leonard, Menges and Mike Normand were named to the All-Tournament team. UCLA ended the season 30–5. It was the fourth championship in five years for the Bruins. Menges earned All-American honors in his senior year at UCLA.

With the win UCLA had gained its fourth national title.

UCLA's Bob Leonard was named the Most Outstanding Player of the tournament.

Team	Appearance	Previous
Ball State	5th	1973
Springfield	2nd	1971
UCLA	4th	1972
UC Santa Barbara	4th	1972

== Tournament bracket ==
- Site: Robertson Gymnasium, Santa Barbara, California

Semifinals
UCLA (3)	15	15	15
Ball State (0)	10	9	9
UC Santa Barbara (3)	15	15	15
Springfield	7	3	10

Championship
UCLA (3)	10	15	10	15	15
UC Santa Barbara (2)	15	8	15	11	12
Third place
Ball State (2)	15	14	15
Springfield (1)	4	16	9

== All tournament team ==
- Bob Leonard, UCLA (Most outstanding player)
- Jim Menges, UCLA
- Mike Normand, UCLA
- Gerald Gregory, UC Santa Barbara
- David DeGroot, UC Santa Barbara
- Jon Roberts, UC Santa Barbara
- Jim Stone, Ball State
