= 2024 Hawaii Rainbow Warriors volleyball team =

Volleyball team season

2024 Hawaii Rainbow Warriors volleyball

2024 Big West Conference men's volleyball tournament, Semi Finals
- Conference: Big West Conference
- Record: 23-7 (5-5 Big West)
- Head coach: Charlie Wade (15th season)
- Associate head coach: Milan Zarkovic (11th season)
- Assistant coaches: Kupono Fey (2nd season); Chad Giesseman (1st season)
- Home stadium: Stan Sheriff Center

The 2024 Hawaii Rainbow Warriors volleyball team is the varsity intercollegiate volleyball program of the University of Hawaiʻi at Mānoa (UH). The Rainbow Warriors, led by 15th-year head coach Charlie Wade, played their home matches at the Stan Sheriff Center on the UH campus in the Honolulu neighborhood of Mānoa. The Rainbow Warriors, members of the Big West Conference, were picked near the top of the Big West preseason coaches poll, with Long Beach State favored to win the conference. Hawaiʻi entered the 2024 season as a national contender and recent NCAA champion, having won back-to-back national titles in 2021 and 2022. The Rainbow Warriors concluded the 2024 season with a loss to UC Irvine in the Big West Conference postseason tournament, marking the first time since 2018 that the Bows did not appear in the NCAA Tournament.

2024 Big West Conference men's volleyball standings
	Conf.				Overall
Team	W		L	PCT	W		L	PCT
No. 2 Long Beach State ‍†‍‡‍^{y}	9	–	1	.900	27	–	3	.900
No. 4 UC Irvine ‍‍‍^{y}	7	–	3	.700	20	–	11	.645
No. 5 Hawaii ‍‍‍	5	–	5	.500	23	–	7	.767
No. 20 UC San Diego ‍‍‍	4	–	6	.400	12	–	15	.444
No. 14 Cal State Northridge ‍‍‍	3	–	7	.300	13	–	16	.448
UC Santa Barbara ‍‍‍	2	–	8	.200	9	–	18	.333
† – Conference champion ‡ – Big West tournament champion y – Invited to the NCAA tournament Rankings from AVCA

== Previous season ==
Last season, the University of Hawaii finished with a 29–3 record, going 9–1 in the Big West, and being named conference champions. They received the Big West's automatic bid to the 2024 NCAA men's volleyball tournament, beating UC Santa Barbara and UC Irvine to win the 2024 Big West tournament. Hawaii finished the season ranked third in the nation following the NCAA tournament's conclusion, where they fell in the finals to UCLA.

== Preseason ==
Both the preseason All-Big West team, and the Big West Coaches' Poll were released on December 21, 2023. Hawaii was picked to finish second in the Big West Conference and had two players make the preseason team.

=== Big West Coaches' Poll ===
Coaches' Poll
Pos.	Team	Points
1	Long Beach State	23 (3)
2	Hawai'i	21 (2)
3	UC Irvine	19 (1)
4	UC Santa Barbara	11
T-5	CSUN	8
T-5	UC San Diego	8

=== Preseason All-Big West Team ===
Preseason All-Big West Team
Player	No.	Position	Class
Spyros Chakas	6	Outside/Opp. Hitter	Senior
Guilherme Voss	21	Outside/Opp. Hitter	Senior

== Roster ==
2024 Hawaii Rainbow Warriors Roster
Defensive Specialist/Libero: 5 'Eleu Choy - Junior; 11 Ryan Sears - Freshman; 15 Kai Taylor - (redshirt) Freshman; Middle Blockers: 3 Zack Yewchuk - Freshman; 8 Kurt Nusterer - (redshirt) Freshman; 14 Alaka'i Todd - Junior; 19 Alex Parks - (redshirt) Freshman; 21 Guilherme Voss - Junior; 22 Zachary Thompson - Junior	Outside Hitters: 1 Chaz Galloway - Junior; 4 Cole Ottmar - (redshirt) Sophomore; 6 Spyros Chakas - Senior; 7 Kai Rodriguez - Freshman; 9 Justin Todd - Freshman; 15 Kai Taylor - (redshirt) Freshman; 20 Keoni Thiim - Senior; 23 Louis Sakanoko - Freshman	Opposite Hitters: 3 Zack Yewchuk - Freshman; 6 Spyros Chakas - Junior; 12 Austin Buchanan - Junior; 14 Alaka'i Todd - Senior.; 17 Oguzhan Oguz - Sophomore; 23 Louis Sakanoko - Feshman; Setters: 12 Austin Buchanan - Sophomore; 13 Tread Rosenthal - Freshman; 16 Kevin Kauling - Graduate

=== Coaches ===
2024 Hawaii Rainbow Warriors Coaching Staff
- Charlie Wade – head coach – 15th year
- Milan Zarkovic – associate head coach – 11th year
- Kupono Fey - assistant coach - 2nd year
- Chad Giesseman – assistant coach – 1st year

== Schedule ==
Date Time	TV/Radio	Opponent	Rank	Stadium	Score	Sets	Attendance	Overall	BWC
Jan. 3 7 p.m.	SPEC	Loyola Chicago	#3	Stan Sheriff Center Honolulu, HI	W, 3–0	25–23 25–19 25–20	5,461	1-0	—
Jan. 5 7 p.m.	SPEC	Loyola Chicago	#3	Stan Sheriff Center Honolulu, HI	L, 2–3	25–18 22–25 25–18 23–25 13-15	5,868	1-1	—
Jan. 10 7 p.m.	SPEC	Emmanuel	#4	Stan Sheriff Center Honolulu, HI	W, 3–0	25–10 25–19 25–16	4,862	2-1	—
Jan. 12 7 p.m.	SPEC	Emmanuel	#4	Stan Sheriff Center Honolulu, HI	W, 3–0	25–7 25–8 25–18	5,903	3-1	—
Jan. 25 2 p.m.	ESPN Honolulu (Radio)	@ Purdue Fort Wayne	#4	Gates Sports Center Fort Wayne, IN	W, 3-1	22–25 25–13 25–21 25–14	897	4-1	—
Jan. 26; 2 p.m.	ESPN Honolulu	@ Purdue Fort Wayne	#4	Gates Sports Center Fort Wayne, IN	W, 3-0	25–19 25–19 25–12	1385	5-1	—
Jan. 28; 2:00 p.m.	ESPN Honolulu	@ Ball State	#4	Worthen Arena Muncie, IN	W, 3-1	25–23 23–25 25–21 25–19	2526	6-1	—
Feb. 2; 7 p.m.	SPEC	Tusculum	#3	Stan Sheriff Center Honolulu, HI	W, 3-0	25–11 25–16 25–17	5417	7-1	—
Feb. 4; 5 p.m.	SPEC	Tusculum	#3	Stan Sheriff Center Honolulu, HI	W, 3-0	25–15 25–11 25–7	4874	8-1	—
Feb. 7; 7 p.m.	SPEC	Stanford	#3	Stan Sheriff Center Honolulu, HI	W, 3-1	21–25 25–15 25–22 25–12	6125	9-1	—
Feb. 9; 7 p.m.	SPEC	Stanford	#3	Stan Sheriff Center Honolulu, HI	W, 3-0	27–25 25–7 25–20	9226	10-1	—
Feb. 22; 7 p.m.	SPEC	Missouri S&T	#3	Stan Sheriff Center Honolulu, HI	W, 3-0	25–12 25–12 25–20	4922	11-1	—
Feb. 23; 7 p.m.	SPEC	Missouri S&T	#3	Stan Sheriff Center; Honolulu, HI	W, 3-0	25–14 25–18 25–17	5345	12-1	—
Mar. 1; 7 p.m.	SPEC	Sacred Heart	#3	Stan Sheriff Center; Honolulu, HI	W, 3-0	25–17 25–13 25–17	5160	13-1	—
Mar. 3; 5 p.m.	SPEC	Sacred Heart	#3	Stan Sheriff Center; Honolulu, HI	W, 3-0	25–17 25–16 25–20	4851	14-1	—
OUTRIGGER Volleyball Invitational
Mar. 7; 7 p.m.	SPEC	Lewis	#3	Stan Sheriff Center; Honolulu, HI	W, 3-0	25–9 25–18 25–21	4908	15-1	—
Mar. 8; 7 p.m.	SPEC	Grand Canyon	#3	Stan Sheriff Center; Honolulu, HI	W, 3-0	25–17 25–20 25–20	8422	16-1	—
Mar. 10; 5 p.m.	SPEC	UC Irvine	#3	Stan Sheriff Center Honolulu, HI	W, 3-2	23–25 25–19 25–22 17–25 15–13	7558	17-1	—
Big West Conference Play
3/17; 7 p.m.	ESPN Honolulu	@ Long Beach State*	#1	LBS Financial Credit Union Pyramid Long Beach, CA	L, 0-3	22-25 20-25 28-30	4012	17-2	0-1
3/18; 7 p.m.	ESPN Honolulu	@ Long Beach State*	#1	LBS Financial Credit Union Pyramid Long Beach, CA	L, 2-3	20-25 25-20 23-25 26-24 13-15	4062	17-3	0-2
3/24; 4 p.m.	SPEC	CSUN*	#2	Stan Sheriff Center Honolulu, HI	W, 3-1	25-15 19-25 27-25 25-17	6858	18-3	1-2
3/25; 4 p.m.	SPEC	CSUN*	#2	Stan Sheriff Center Honolulu, HI	L, 1-3	23-25 16-25 25-22 21-25	6839	18-4	1-3
3/31; 4 p.m.	SPEC	UC Santa Barbara*	#5	Stan Sheriff Center Honolulu, HI	W, 3-0	25-23 25-21 26-24	7490	19-4	2-3
4/01; 4 p.m.	SPEC	UC Santa Barbara*	#5	Stan Sheriff Center Honolulu, HI	W, 3-2	25-21 26-24 23-25 21-25 15-12	9654	20-4	3-3
4/07; 7 p.m.	ESPN Honolulu	@ UC Irvine*	#4	Bren Events Center Irvine, CA	L, 0-3	20-25 19-25 21-25	2058	20-5	3-4
4/08; 7 p.m.	ESPN Honolulu	@ UC Irvine*	#4	Bren Event Center Irvine, CA	W, 3-1	22-25 27-25 25-18 25-18	2600	21-5	4-4
4/14; 7 p.m.	ESPN Honolulu	@ UC San Diego*	#5	LionTree Arena La Jolla, CA	W, 3-1	25-20 25-16 12-25 25-20	1470	22-5	5-4
4/15; 7 p.m.	ESPN Honolulu	@ UC San Diego*	#5	LionTree Arena La Jolla, CA	L, 0-3	25-27 21-25 20-25	1921	22-6	5-5
OUTRIGGER Big West Championship presented by the Hawaiian Islands
4/18; 7 p.m.	SPEC	UC Santa Barbara	#3	Stan Sheriff Center Honolulu, HI	W, 3-1	23-25 25-20 25-17 25-23	6087	23-6	—
4/19; 7 p.m.	SPEC	UC Irvine	#3	Stan Sheriff Center Honolulu, HI	L, 0-3	24-26 34-36 15-25	6400	23-7	—

== Rankings ==
	Week																
Poll	Pre	1	2	3	4	5	6	7	8	9	10	11	12	13	14	15	Final
AVCA	3	4	3	4	3	3	3	3	3	3	1	2	5	4	5	5	5
