= Jim Menges =

American volleyball player

Personal information
- Full name: James Menges
- Nickname: Mingo
- Born: January 10, 1951 (age 75); Santa Monica, California, U.S.
- Hometown: Santa Monica, California, U.S.
- Height: 6 ft 2 in (1.88 m)
- Weight: 205 lb (93 kg)
- Education: UCLA

James Menges (born January 10, 1951) is an American former volleyball player, coach, and Association of Volleyball Professionals (AVP) tournament director. He played college volleyball for the UCLA Bruins under head coach Al Scates. His college teams won national championships in 1972 and 1974. He is best known for beach volleyball, where he was the game's most dominant player from the mid 1970s through the early 1980s.

== Early life and college career ==
Menges grew up in Santa Monica, California. He was a standout athlete at Santa Monica High School. Out of high school he was awarded a scholarship to play volleyball for Al Scates at UCLA. Menges played outside hitter and setter in Scates' 6-2 offense, and by his sophomore year in 1972 he had earned a spot in the starting rotation.

The two-time defending national champion Bruins of 1972 were not considered college volleyball's best men's team. The two teams favored to win the national championship were the UC Santa Barbara Gauchos and the Aztecs of San Diego State. The Bruins earned an at-large bid and traveled to Muncie, Indiana for the 1972 national tournament held at Ball State University. The format of the tournament at the time consisted of a four-team preliminary round robin to determine seeding into a subsequent single-elimination championship bracket. The Bruins played well early in round robin play until they were badly beaten by the Aztecs of San Diego State, 15-7, 15-11. UCLA, UC Santa Barbara and UCSD all ended up with 2 - 1 records, but the Bruins were given the top position in the playoff seeding on the basis of points differential. In their semi-final, they easily defeated Ball State, while UCSD defeated UC Santa Barbara in the other semi-final to set up a championship final between the Bruins and San Diego State. SDSU took the first two games, and with an 8-3 lead in the third appeared ready for a three game sweep. The Bruins rallied, however, to win in an upset, 10-15, 9-15, 15-9, 15-10, 15-7. UCLA finished the season with a 27-7 record and their third consecutive national crown.

In 1973, Menges and the Bruins finished 4th in the 18-team Southern California Intercollegiate Volleyball Association (SCIVA). UCLA met San Diego State at the regional finals in Pauley Pavilion in a rematch of the 1972 national championship match. UCLA went up 2-0 before a three game comeback by the Aztecs eliminated the Bruins from the tournament. Said the Aztec's Chris Marlowe: “When we came back and beat UCLA in Pauley, it was like it was willed to be. It was like God came down from the mountain and was rooting for the Aztecs.” San Diego State went on to win the 1973 national championship. The Bruins finished the season 21-8.

1974 saw Menges and the Bruins finish 3rd in the SCIVA, behind UCSB and Southern Cal. The 1974 NCAA men's volleyball tournament was held on the UC Santa Barbara campus, and UC Santa Barbara was the heavy favorite to win it. UCLA made it to the NCAA tournament by upsetting Southern Cal in their district playoffs. The previous final four tournament format of round robin play for seeding followed by a single-elimination playoff was dropped in 1974 in favor of going directly to a single-elimination playoff. The tournament field remained limited to four teams. In the semi-finals, UCLA defeated Ball State in straight sets while UCSB defeated Springfield in straight sets. The championship match was a back and forth affair, with UCSB beating the Bruins in Games 1 and 3, while UCLA took games 2 and 4. Many of the Bruin kills were coming from an inside attack, with UCLA's Bob Leonard receiving fast tempo sets from Menges. In the game five clincher, the Gauchos led 6-1 before the Bruins rallied with six straight points to lead 7-6. UCLA kept just enough momentum to take the championship: 10-15, 15-8, 10-15, 15-11, 15-12. Menges and Mike Normand were named to the All-Tournament team. UCLA ended the season 30-5. It was the fourth championship in five years for the Bruins. Menges earned All-American honors in his senior year at UCLA.

== Beach career ==
Menges started playing beach volleyball on Santa Monica's Sorrento Beach at the age of 17. He commonly played with and against Tom Chamales, who had graduated a year before him from Santa Monica High, and Randy Niles. Initially, they played Santa Monica's "outside courts" before being invited up to play the "first court". It was at Santa Monica in 1972 that Menges met longtime partner Greg Lee. Menges' first Open tournament victory was with Lee at the 1973 Marine Open. They were partners off and on for the next two seasons while each completed an athletic career at UCLA. Menges played volleyball for Al Scates while Lee played basketball as a guard for John Wooden during the Bill Walton era. On the 1974 beach volleyball circuit Menges advanced to the finals of 4 events, winning 2 times, once with Chamales and once with Ron Von Hagen.

In 1975, Menges and Lee began playing full-time together, and the two went on a tear. They reached the finals of 10 events, winning all but one. In the mid-1970s, the beach volleyball tour consisted of 12 tournaments played up and down the southern California coast, from San Diego in the south to Santa Cruz in the north. Menges and Lee dominated the events, winning the final seven events of the 1975 season and the first six in 1976 to string together 13 tournament wins in a row. Conditioning and determination were a big part of the success they found. Said Menges: "In those days, teams in the winners' bracket played best-of-three matches to 11 points; losers'-bracket matches were best of three to 15 points." Some matches lasted as long as three hours. "It was more of an endurance game back then. You had to be in great shape."

In the mid to late 1970s, the team of Menges and Lee was the most dominant pairing on the beach volleyball scene. Their record of 13 Open wins in a row stood for 16 years until tied by the pair of Karch Kiraly and Kent Steffes. They made the finals in all 28 volleyball tournaments they entered together, and won 25 of them. The first pro beach volleyball World Championship was won by Menges and Lee in 1976. The 25 tournament wins by Menges and Lee places the pair at #6 on the all-time list of wins for a team.

Partner changes are common in Pro Beach Volleyball, and Menges played with many of the game's top players. Besides Ron Von Hagen and Greg Lee mentioned above, Menges partnered extensively in 1977 with Chris Marlow, and later with Matt Gage. Menges won his second Manhattan with Marlowe in 1977. In all he won six tournaments that year with Marlow, with the pair finishing off the year in September with a World Championship win, the second for Menges. Menges and Gage teamed-up 11 times in 1979, reaching he finals 8 times and winning 4 of them. Counting all years Menges and Gage entered 17 events together, winning 8 of them. Said Gage: “Menges and Von Hagen were my two strongest partners. I was comfortable with either one of those guys, and we had the same philosophy about siding out to wear down opponents.”

Menges was a part of the early success of such players as Sinjin Smith, who won his first Manhattan Open teaming with Menges in 1979, and Randy Stoklos, who won his first Manhattan Open with Menges in 1981. At the time of the 1981 Manhattan Open Stoklos was a 20-year-old just out of UCLA, while Menges was a beach veteran of 31. Menges also won tournaments pairing with Tom Chamales, Gary Hooper and Jon Stevenson. Menges offered that with all said and done, Greg Lee was his favorite partner.

On the 1980 beach volleyball circuit, Menges advanced to the finals of 8 events, winning 3 times. In 1981 and 1982, he reached 6 finals, winning 4 times, including his last championship win at the 1982 Mission Beach Open. He retired in 1983, but came out of retirement in 1991 at the age of 40 to compete in the AVP Beach circuit. He played in 15 more tournaments before retiring again.

All told during his 13-year career Menges entered 75 Open tournaments, advancing to the finals 62 times, and winning 48 events. The Manhattan Beach Open, the oldest and most prestigious pro beach event, was considered the premier event in the 1970s. Menges won the Manhattan five times, winning titles in 1975 and 1978 with Greg Lee, in 1977 with Chris Marlowe, in 1979 with Sinjin Smith and in 1981 with Randy Stoklos.

Menges was considered king of the beach in the mid to late 1970s. He and Lee were the subject of numerous articles on beach volleyball, and the image of a bandana clad Jim Menges digging up a volleyball made the cover of Volleyball Magazine. Following a loss that stopped Kiraly and Steffes from breaking the tour record of 13 tournament championships in a row set in 1975-76 by Menges and Lee, Kiraly said: "I guess it's appropriate that Menges and Lee stay in the record book. They laid the foundation for the sport."

== Post beach career ==
Following his playing days, Menges entered the real estate field in Orange County. During the late 1990s and 2000s, he became involved in coaching beach volleyball players and helped Jose Loiola and Emanuel Rego become the first team to qualify for the 2000 Olympics in Sydney, Australia. Menges has also served as Tournament Director for the AVP Tour.

Menges was inducted into the CBVA Beach Volleyball Hall of Fame in 1994.

== Player profile ==
During Menges' years of prominence, the side-out scoring system of the day resulted in much longer matches. To score points, you had to prevent the opposing team from siding out. It was consistency that won matches, and Menges was relentless in his focus and consistency. Like Lang and Von Hagen before him, and Smith and Stoklos after, Menges would defeat teams with a concentration and intensity that never faltered throughout two and three hour contests. Smaller than Lee, he would invariably get served and have control of their side out game. If teams altered their tactic and served Lee, Menges would set perfectly and play an intense, ball hawking defense. He would wear down his opponents, placing a relentless pressure on them to avoid making mistakes in long side-out battles, while not allowing himself or his partners to make errors when it was their turn to receive serve. He was the games best setter and an outstanding digger. Menges prepared for tournaments just by playing the game, and he played game after game, spending all day at the beach every day. Menges played for the fun of it and for the challenge of trying to prove himself. Said Menges, what he enjoyed most was... "the competition and being outside at the beach getting great exercise. I enjoyed playing tournaments to compete with others and to see who was the best". Menges excelled at the mental and physical skills of two man beach volleyball, and these enabled him to dominate the game and define an era of the sport.

As top accomplishments in beach volleyball, Menges lists: "First winning the first World Championship at Santa Monica's State Beach with Greg Lee in 1975. Second was winning those five Manhattan Beach Opens. That's something I'm proud of because everyone wanted to win the Manhattan. Third was my first Open win at the Marine Open with Greg Lee in 1973, beating Ron Lang and Ron Von Hagen in the finals. Fourth was winning the Hermosa Beach Open with Matt Gage in 1980."
