= Chris Marlowe =

American sportscaster and volleyball player (born 1951)

Personal information
- Full name: Christian Marlowe
- Nickname: The Lion
- Born: September 28, 1951 (age 75); Los Angeles, California, U.S.
- Hometown: Santa Monica, California, U.S.
- Height: 6 ft 2 in (1.88 m)
- Weight: 205 lb (93 kg)
- Education: San Diego State University

Volleyball information
- Position: Outside hitter / Setter
- Number: 10

National team
| 1976–1984 | United States |
Medal record
Men's volleyball
Representing the United States
Olympic Games
| Gold medal – first place | 1984 Los Angeles | Team |
NORCECA Championship
| Gold medal – first place | 1983 Indianapolis |

Christian Marlowe (born September 28, 1951) is an American professional sportscaster based in Denver, Colorado. He is the former play-by-play announcer for the Denver Nuggets of the National Basketball Association and in the summer he is a play-by-play announcer for the Association of Volleyball Professionals. He is a former collegiate basketball and volleyball player and played on the US National Men's Volleyball Team. He played beach volleyball extensively and won numerous tournaments on the Open beach circuit. He also was a captain of the US men's volleyball team that won the gold medal at the 1984 Olympic Games.

== Early life ==
Marlowe was born in Los Angeles, California on September 28, 1951, and grew up in Pacific Palisades. His father, Hugh Marlowe, was an actor and starred in over 30 movies. His mother, K.T. Stevens, was also an actor, and appeared in 11 films. Marlowe's maternal grandfather was the prolific film director Sam Wood, who was a three-time Academy Award nominee.

Marlowe grew up playing volleyball on the beach. He was a two-sport standout at Palisades High School in Los Angeles, California, playing basketball and volleyball. His Palisades High volleyball teams won three Los Angeles city championships. He graduated in 1969, after being selected a high school All-American.

== College career ==
Marlowe was awarded an athletic scholarship at San Diego State University, where he played both basketball and volleyball. San Diego State competed in the Pacific Coast Athletic Association in basketball. Marlowe played guard, and was a steady and consistent performer. He was selected Pacific Coast Athletic Association "Newcomer of the Year" in his freshman year. By his senior year, he was on the PCAA All-Conference team. Marlowe lettered all four seasons at SDSU, and set a school record by playing in 114 consecutive games.

In volleyball, San Diego State competed in the 18-team Southern California Intercollegiate Volleyball Association (SCIVA). Volleyball was a new sport for the NCAA, having been first sanctioned as a championship sport in 1970, Marlowe's freshman year. The competition in college volleyball was dominated by the schools of southern California. The Aztecs of San Diego State were soon contenders for the national title, and Marlowe was one of the standouts on the team.

In his junior year of 1971–72, Marlowe's Aztecs stepped into the spotlight as one of the nation's top teams. Marlowe was a starting outside hitter and setter for the Aztecs. SDSU and UC Santa Barbara were considered the top favorites to win the national championship. 1972 was the first appearance by the Aztecs in the four team volleyball championship. At the time the format of the tournament matched the format of a USVBA tournament, and consisted of a four-team preliminary round robin to determine seeding into a subsequent single-elimination championship bracket. SDSU made the trip back to Ball State University in Muncie, Indiana where the 1972 national tournament was being held. In round robin play, the Aztecs beat Ball State 2–1 (15–8, 6–15, 15–5) and handled UCLA 2–0 (15–13, 15–7) before losing to UCSB 0-2 (13–15, 10–15). UCLA, UC Santa Barbara and SDSU all ended up with identical 2 - 1 records, but the Bruins earned the top position in the playoff seeding on the basis of points differential. The Bruins easily beat Ball State in their semi-final. In the other semi-final, SDSU was down 2 games to none before they bounced back and avenged their round robin loss, defeating UC Santa Barbara in five, 11–15, 13–15, 15–9, 15–11, 15–12 for a 3–2 win. The win set up a championship final between San Diego State and the Bruins. In the championship match SDSU jumped out 2 games to none, and with an 8–3 lead in the third appeared ready for a three-game sweep. However, the Bruins rallied back to win it, 10–15, 9–15, 15–9, 15–10, 15–7. UCLA had won their third consecutive national crown.

In his senior year, Marlowe was voted team captain. California teams still dominated the national scene, and Long Beach State was the top ranked team and the favorite to win the title. In the regional finals, San Diego State met defending national champion UCLA at UCLA's Pauley Pavilion in a rematch of the 1972 national championship match. The Bruins went up 2–0 before a three-game comeback by the Aztecs eliminated the Bruins from the tournament. After the win, Marlowe commented to a Sports Illustrated writer: "When we came back and beat UCLA in Pauley, it was like it was willed to be. It was like God came down from the mountain and was rooting for the Aztecs."

The 1973 national championship tournament was hosted by San Diego State University in San Diego, California. In preliminary round robin play held in Peterson Gym, the Aztecs beat Army 2-0 (15–1, 15–5) and Ball State 2-1 (17–19, 15–12, 15–5) before losing to Long Beach State 1-2 (15–10, 13–15, 7–15). Long Beach State ended round robin play with a perfect 3–0 record and the #1 seed. SDSU was seeded second with a 2–1 record, Ball State was third seed and Army was seeded fourth. In their semi-final, SDSU defeated Ball State 3-0 (15–5, 15–7, 15–10) while Long Beach State defeated Army 3-0 (15–5, 15–1, 15–2), setting up a championship final between San Diego State and Long Beach State. A record crowd showed up at the San Diego Sports Arena for the championship final. In what was then the largest crowd to witness a volleyball match in the U.S., more than 10,000 fans were on hand as the Aztecs lost the first game of the match 11–15. Game 2 saw the noise in the gym reach a deafening level, as the Aztecs came back to beat Long Beach State in a barn burner, 15–13. The final two games were all Aztecs, as they won them 15–8, 15–6 to give them their first national championship. With the title point the fans stormed the court to celebrate the achievement. The championship win was the first and only Division I team title ever won by San Diego State University.

The 1973 San Diego State volleyball team finished with a collegiate won-loss record of 20–5. Marlowe was selected to the All Tournament team and was made first team All-American. The 1973 San Diego State volleyball team was inducted into the SDSU hall of Fame in 2003.

Marlowe graduated from San Diego State in 1974 with a B.A. in physical education.

Following his collegiate career, Marlowe continued to play volleyball on the club level, and competed on one of the nation's best USVBA teams. He was voted Most Valuable Player at the USVBA Open Nationals in 1976 and again in 1978.

== Beach career ==
Marlowe started competing in beach tournaments in 1975. On the beach he was nicknamed "The Lion" for his intensity and the unruly blonde hair that blew about on the top of Marlowe's head. In 1976 he was a captain on the national indoor team, but the team failed to qualify for the Olympic games. Marlowe had time enough left in the summer to team with Steve Obradovich and win the largest and most coveted beach event of the day, the Manhattan Beach Open.

The following year was Marlowe's big year in the sand. He teamed with Jim Menges, whose former partner, Greg Lee, had left to pursue a career in professional basketball. The pairing of Menges and Marlowe was dynamic. Together they took a first at the Santa Barbara Open followed by another first at the Hermosa Beach Open. Marlowe then paired with Ron Von Hagen to win the Rosecrans Open. Teaming with Menges again they won at the San Diego Open before the pair finally lost a championship match to Obradovich and Gary Hooper in the finals of the Laguna Beach Open. They came back to win at the Manhattan Beach Open and grabbed another first at the Lake Tahoe Open, before finishing the year by taking the world championship at the State Beach Open held at Will Rogers State Beach.

Marlowe did not play on the beach in 1978 but returned in 1979, partnering with Fred Sturm. They had one 3rd-place finish and five others in the top five. Following 1979, he moved away from the beach to focus instead on his fledgling acting career until 1982, when he returned to the US National team.

All told Marlowe won eight open tournaments, including two highly prestigious Manhattan Beach Opens and the 1977 World Championship.

== US National Team ==
Following his graduation from college, Marlowe continued to play volleyball on indoor national club teams which competed in the Open division of the USVBA. At the 1976 USVBA Open National Championship he was voted the Most Valuable Player. Following the tournament, he was selected to play on the US National team. His teammates chose him to be their team captain. The US national team failed to qualify for the 1976 Olympic games, and Marlowe returned to California and beach volleyball.

In 1977, the program hired former player Doug Beal as head coach of the U.S. Men's National Team. He became the driving force for establishing a full-time, year-around volleyball training center. The facility opened in 1978 in Dayton, Ohio. However, California was the hot bed of volleyball talent at the time, and though the nation's top players were willing to play on the national team, many were unable to relocate to Dayton. In 1980, the US national team again failed to qualify for the Olympic games, this time held in Moscow. The United States had boycotted the games, making the failure to qualify a moot point, but it was clear the US team had to make a change. In 1981 the national team training center was moved to San Diego, California. Marlowe rejoined the National team in 1982.

In 1982, the US team was ranked 13th internationally. A collection of the top collegiate players from the California area joined Marlowe on the team, including Karch Kiraly, Dusty Dvorak, Steve Timmons, Craig Buck, Steven Salmons, Pat Powers and Doug Partie. At this point, being on the national team was a full-time job, practicing five hours a day, five days a week. Marlowe had to adjust from being an outside hitter and setter in a 6-2 system, to a full-time setter in the 5-1 system the national team was using. It was a significant adjustment, but at this point in his career it was one he had to make to play at the Olympic level. He appealed to SDSU Aztecs coach Jack Henn to help him make the transition from outside hitter to setter. "Chris and I had a little bit of a falling-out after ’73," Henn said. "But he realized he had to change positions to play in the Olympics. He could have gone off in his gold chains, but he humbled himself and asked for help." By the following year, the U.S. squad was among the world's elite teams. Coming into the 1984 Olympic games, the roster had to be cut down to 12 players. Marlowe was the last man cut.

In the late spring of 1984, the US National team went on a five match tour of the Soviet Union, whose national team was the reigning world champions. The US swept all five matches of the series. Near the end of the final match, some six weeks before the start of the Olympics, setter Rod Wilde landed on the foot of a Soviet player who had crossed under the net. Wilde suffered a broken leg. Marlowe was asked to rejoin the team. In a show of support, his teammates selected him team captain by a unanimous vote on his first day back.

The turnaround for the US National team culminated with the gold medal at the 1984 Olympic Games in Los Angeles. Playing at the Olympic games and winning the gold medal were lifetime achievements for Marlowe. Asked how he felt, Marlowe said "I felt like I was on Cloud 10, one notch higher than Cloud 9."

Said US National Team head coach Doug Beal: "Chris wasn’t the most gifted player. He wasn’t the best jumper, but he had the knack of making people around him better. He saw the game like few players see it. He always made good decisions. He ranks right up there with the best competitors of all time. In ’84, we trained for 10 days before the Olympics in Pullman, Washington. That was the most intense, most emotional time, and Chris was the key to that training and our success."

== Entertainment and acting ==
Marlowe had come from a family of actors. He pursued this career as well, and in 1978 he spent a year appearing in the daytime TV series Love of Life. He also had several minor film roles. His movie credits include Rollerball, Rounders, Look Who's Talking Too, The 6th Man and Side Out. Early in his career, he guest starred on TV's The Love Boat, A Man Called Sloane, and Bosom Buddies, and was a regular on the short-lived Highcliffe Manor. During this time Marlowe also worked doing sports broadcasting jobs.

Following the 1984 Olympics, Marlowe's agent guided him to make a choice between pursuing a further career in acting or a further career in sports broadcasting. Said Marlowe: "That was a time when I was always auditioning for parts but nothing I really wanted. So a sports announcer job for me seemed to be more natural. I was playing the role of myself, which I really enjoyed."

== Broadcast career ==
Marlowe is a play-by-play announcer who splits his time between two major commitments. In the fall, winter and spring, he resides in Denver and did the play-by-play announcing for the Denver Nuggets of the NBA until 2026. In the summers, he returns to Los Angeles and works as a play-by-play announcer for the AVP. In addition to basketball and volleyball, he has done play-by-play announcing of over 25 other sports, and is considered one of America's most versatile television sports broadcasters.

Marlowe first got an opportunity to do TV broadcast work when ABC hired him to provide color commentary for the 1978 NCAA indoor volleyball championship. UCLA head coach Al Scates had been doing commentary for ABC when the Bruins were not in the NCAA championship tournament. In 1978 the Bruins made the final, and ABC asked Scates if he knew someone who could replace him in the booth. Scates got to know Marlowe as Marlowe used to work out at the Bruin gym, and Scates recommended him. Marlowe's first job was providing color commentary for the NCAA championship match between UCLA and Pepperdine. Said Scates: "They liked Chris so much, that was the end of my television career." Marlowe found he enjoyed broadcasting, and that he was good at it. Between acting jobs and his own volleyball commitments he continued to do color commentary for both indoor and beach volleyball for the next several years.

After Marlowe completed his athletic career with the 1984 Olympic games, he made a serious commitment to sports broadcasting, and he took courses in the skills of the trade. Marlowe credits sportscasting expert Lou Riggs of Santa Monica College for training him in sports broadcasting fundamentals. When Marlowe started with Prime Ticket, his first partner on play-by-play was Lynn Shackleford. He next worked with Keith Erickson. When Erickson quit that opened up the play-by-play spot that Marlowe had been preparing for. Marlowe moved over to play-by-play and was joined in the booth by former teammate Paul Sunderland as his analyst. Marlowe and Sunderland knew each other well, and had first played together on the U.S. National Indoor Volleyball Team in 1975. "When Paul moved into the color spot that really clicked. We were old friends, played together on the national team for years, and our chemistry was fantastic." Marlowe and Sunderland called their first volleyball event in 1985, doing the college regional playoff match between San Diego State and Pepperdine. Their first work broadcasting at an Olympic games was at the Summer Olympics in Barcelona in 1992. They teamed up again for the Olympics in Atlanta, and again four years later in Sydney.

Moving from analyst/color commentator to play-by-play was a big step-up in difficulty for Marlowe, but it meant many more broadcast opportunities. "It was smart to move to play-by-play because there is always someone else coming up who can fill the analyst role. Once I started doing that, I realized I could be good at it. I’m smart, and quick, good with numbers and could set up the analyst." Soon Marlowe was branching out into basketball, and then other sports as well. "My bosses at Prime Ticket started letting me do basketball – I also played that – and that led to me doing other things like boxing, gymnastics, swimming, water polo … even windsurfing."

Marlowe has worked to become very versatile. In his nearly 40-year career in sports broadcasting, he has covered and announced a variety of sporting events. Marlowe called Pacific 10 Basketball for FOX Sports Northwest in addition to handling USC Trojan play-by-play duties for FOX Sports West. Marlowe also did Pacific-10 college football play-by-play for FOX Sports Northwest, NCAA college basketball on ESPN and FOX, San Diego State basketball and WUSA Soccer for San Diego's Cox Cable, AVP Professional Beach Volleyball for NBC, college volleyball for CSTV, and NCAA Championships in swimming, diving, gymnastics and volleyball for ESPN. He has also called aerobics, baseball, boxing, cliff-diving, equestrian show jumping, fencing, poker, rhythmic gymnastics, skiing, college soccer, track and field, water polo, windsurfing and wrestling. He has hosted sports programs such as the "UCLA Sports Magazine" for Prime Sports, the "Just for Kicks" soccer show on ESPN, the "Marlowe Minute" for Dig Magazine on FOX Sports West and the "Aztec Sports Weekly" for Cox Cable.

Along with assignments for Fox Sports Net, Marlowe was the announcer for every Association of Volleyball Professionals event in the late 1980s and early 1990s. He was also an occasional anchor on the Southern California Sports Report. Marlowe is a veteran of six consecutive Olympic telecasts on NBC, starting with calling play-by-play for NBC's coverage of beach volleyball at the 2004 Summer Olympics in Athens, Greece. Marlowe also has done AVP events for NBC, college volleyball for CSTV, and volleyball, football and basketball for ESPN.

Marlowe has seen a number of changes in sports broadcasting over his career, among which is having women in front of the camera. He notes having enjoyed working with Michele Tafoya and Heather Cox, comments that both are very good at their jobs, and states having women as sports broadcasters has been a good change in the sports broadcasting industry.

== Personal life ==
Most of the year Marlowe resides in Denver, Colorado with his wife, Laurie. In the summers, they move to Manhattan Beach, California. They have two grown daughters, both of whom were standout setters for Arapahoe High School in Denver. Their older daughter, MacKenzie, graduated from Chapman University. She is interested in working in the film industry and has interned at DiNovi Pictures. She currently is an executive assistant at William Morris Endeavor. Their younger daughter, Grace, attends the USC School of Cinematic Arts.

== Awards ==
In 1986, Marlowe was inducted into the USVBA Hall of Fame in Wichita, Kansas. Eight years later in 1994, San Diego State inducted Marlowe into their Aztec Hall of Fame. The California Beach Volleyball Hall of Fame elected to induct Marlowe into their hall later that same year. Finally, on 23 April 2017, Marlowe was inducted into the Los Angeles City Section sports Hall of Fame.

At his induction into the Los Angeles City Section sports Hall of Fame, Marlowe spoke of the athletic accomplishments he valued most. Among these, he listed winning three LA city championships at Palisades High School, an NCAA championship at San Diego State University, being selected first team All American in his senior year at San Diego State, being twice selected MVP at the USVBA national championships, winning four USVBA Open team national championships, winning the World Championship and 8 other tournaments on the beach circuit, including the two Manhattans, and a gold medal at the Olympic games. Of them all, what he prized most was winning the Olympic gold medal in front of his family and friends at the games held in Los Angeles in 1984.

== See also ==
- SDSU Aztecs
- USA Volleyball
