= Purdue Boilermakers women's volleyball =

American college volleyball team

- University: Purdue University
- Head coach: Dave Shondell
- Conference: Big Ten
- Location: West Lafayette, Indiana, US
- Nickname: Boilermakers
- Colors: Old gold and black

AIAW/NCAA Regional Final
- 1982, 2010, 2013, 2020, 2021, 2025

AIAW/NCAA regional semifinal
- 1981, 1982, 1983, 1985, 1987, 2005, 2006, 2008, 2010, 2011, 2012, 2013, 2019, 2020, 2021, 2023, 2024, 2025

AIAW/NCAA tournament appearance
- 1978, 1979, 1981, 1982, 1983, 1984, 1985, 1987, 1990, 2004, 2005, 2006, 2007, 2008, 2010, 2011, 2012, 2013, 2015, 2016, 2017, 2018, 2019, 2020, 2021, 2022, 2023, 2024, 2025

Conference regular season champion
- 1982, 1985

Purdue's women's volleyball team is a varsity sports team at Purdue University. The team debuted in 1975. Carol Dewey became the first head coach. She coached for 20 years, when Joey Vrazel took over as head coach.

== History ==
=== Carol Dewey era ===
Carol Dewey was the first coach for the women's volleyball team. The Boilermakers finished with a 15–16 record during their inaugural season. In 1979, the volleyball team became Purdue's first women's revenue sport, and Dewey became a full-time coach. Dewey coached until 1994, accumulating 20 years as head coach for the university. She finished her career with a 469–256 record.

Under Dewey, Purdue's team produced five All-Americans, six Academic All-Americans, and 39 players that received the All-Big Ten award. She also coached three teams that won Big Ten titles, in 1980, 1982, and 1985. In her ninth season as Purdue's head coach, Dewey led the Purdue team to an undefeated regular season. They finished the season ranked eighth in the country.

=== Joey Vrazel era ===
Joey Vrazel was named head coach on February 22, 1995. The team finished the 1995 season with an 8–20 record and finished ninth place in the Big Ten. She announced her resignation after her best season coaching and caught the team and associate athletic director off guard. The former players were not as surprised, with one player expressing that she reported Vrazel's actions to the administration.

=== Jeff Hulsmeyer era ===
The third head coach of the volleyball team was Jeff Hulsmeyer, who started coaching the team in 1999. He was formerly the assistant coach for Illinois. The Boilermakers finished that season with a record of 15–14 record, finishing eighth in the Big Ten.

=== Dave Shondell era ===
Dave Shondell, the current head coach of the program, started his tenure in 2003. During his inaugural season, the attendance record was broken, averaging 1,534 fans per match.

== Facilities ==
The team plays in Holloway Gymnasium, which has a capacity of 2,288.

== Record ==
Season	Coach	Overall	Conference	Standing	Postseason
Carol Dewey () (1975–1981)
1975	Carol Dewey	15–16	3–3	4th	MAIAW Regional Tournament
1976	Carol Dewey	21–16	7–5	4th	IAIAW State Tournament
1977	Carol Dewey	25–11	5–3	4th	IAIAW State Tournament
1978	Carol Dewey	38–9	2–2	t-5th	AIAW Qualifier
1979	Carol Dewey	33–16	6–0	1st	AIAW Qualifier
1980	Carol Dewey	38–15	6–0	1st	MAIAW Regional Tournament
Carol Dewey (Big Ten Conference) (1981–1994)
1981	Carol Dewey	34–8	5–1	3rd	NCAA Regional Semifinals
1982	Carol Dewey	33–1	13–0	1st	NCAA Regional Finals
1983	Carol Dewey	26–6	13–0	2nd	NCAA Regional Semifinals
1984	Carol Dewey	25–12	10–3	2nd	NCAA First Round
1985	Carol Dewey	34–4	17–1	1st	NCAA Regional Semifinals
1986	Carol Dewey	19–16	8–10	6th	
1987	Carol Dewey	24–14	14–4	2nd	NCAA Regional Semifinals
1988	Carol Dewey	19–15	9–9	t-5th	
1989	Carol Dewey	13–20	7–11	7th	
1990	Carol Dewey	21–11	12–6	3rd	NCAA First Round
1991	Carol Dewey	13–16	10–10	t-6th	
1992	Carol Dewey	17–13	10–10	6th	
1993	Carol Dewey	15–14	8–12	6th	
1994	Carol Dewey	6–23	4–16	t-9th	
Carol Dewey:		469–256	169–106		
Joey Vrazel (Big Ten Conference) (1995–1998)
1995	Joey Vrazel	8–20	6–14	9th	
1996	Joey Vrazel	13–19	6–14	8th	
1997	Joey Vrazel	10–21	3–17	10th	
1998	Joey Vrazel	14–15	8–12	7th	
Joey Vrazel:		45–75	23–57		
Jeff Hulsmeyer (Big Ten Conference) (1999–2002)
1999	Jeff Hulsmeyer	15–14	7–14	t-8th	
2000	Jeff Hulsmeyer	13–19	5–15	9th	
2001	Jeff Hulsmeyer	4–25	1–19	11th	
2002	Jeff Hulsmeyer	12–21	2–18	t-10th	
Jeff Hulsmeyer:		44–79	15–65		
Dave Shondell (Big Ten Conference) (2003–present)
2003	Dave Shondell	14–17	7–13	8th	
2004	Dave Shondell	17–15	9–11	t-6th	NCAA Second Round
2005	Dave Shondell	25–9	12–8	5th	NCAA Regional Semifinals
2006	Dave Shondell	23–11	11–9	5th	NCAA Regional Semifinals
2007	Dave Shondell	19–14	11–9	t-3rd	NCAA Second Round
2008	Dave Shondell	26–9	13–7	4th	NCAA Regional Semifinals
2009	Dave Shondell	14–17	6–14	t-7th	
2010	Dave Shondell	24–11	12–8	4th	NCAA Regional Finals
2011	Dave Shondell	29–5	16–4	2nd	NCAA Regional Semifinals
2012	Dave Shondell	23–11	12–8	5th	NCAA Regional Semifinals
2013	Dave Shondell	23–12	11–9	6th	NCAA Regional Finals
2014	Dave Shondell	22–10	12–8	5th	
2015	Dave Shondell	23–10	13–7	5th	NCAA Second Round
2016	Dave Shondell	19–14	8–12	10th	NCAA Second Round
2017	Dave Shondell	23–10	12–8	t-5th	NCAA Second Round
2018	Dave Shondell	24–9	12–8	6th	NCAA Second Round
2019	Dave Shondell	24–8	13–6	5th	NCAA Regional Semifinals
2020	Dave Shondell	16–7	14–6	5th	NCAA Regional Finals
2021	Dave Shondell	26–7	15–5	4th	NCAA Regional Finals
2022	Dave Shondell	21–11	11–9	6th	NCAA Second Round
2023	Dave Shondell	23–9	15–5	t-3rd	NCAA Regional Semifinals
2024	Dave Shondell	27–7	16–4	4th	NCAA Regional Semifinals
Dave Shondell:		485–233	250–158		

Conference ranking source

Note: Purdue played all of its 2020 regular-season and postseason matches in spring 2021

== Boilermakers in professional volleyball ==
=== International Competition ===
Purdue has had one player in the Olympic Games.

- Annie Drews - 2020, 2024 – USA

=== Pro Volleyball Federation ===
- Raven Colvin (2025-)
- Sherridan Atkinson (2025-)
- Jena Otec (2025-)
- Ashley Evans (2024)
- Blake Mohler (2024-)
- Grace Cleveland (2024-)
- Maddie Schermerhorn (2024)

==== PVF Draft Picks ====
The inaugural Pro Volleyball Federation draft was in 2023, starting play for the 2024 season. Two players from Purdue have been selected.

Year	Round	Pick	Player	Team
2023	5	31	Maddie Schermerhorn	Vegas Thrill
2024	1	7	Raven Colvin	Grand Rapids Rise
