= 1981 NCAA men's volleyball tournament =

Tournament details
- Dates: May 1981
- Teams: 4

Final positions
- Champions: UCLA (8th title)
- Runners-up: USC (4th title match)

Tournament statistics
- Matches played: 4
- Attendance: 3,946 (987 per match)

Awards
- Best player: Karch Kiraly (UCLA)

The 1981 NCAA men's volleyball tournament was the 12th annual tournament to determine the national champion of NCAA men's collegiate volleyball. The tournament was played at the UC Santa Barbara Events Center in Santa Barbara, California during May 1981.

UCLA defeated USC in the final match, 3–2 (11–15, 15–7, 15–11, 8–15, 15–13), to win their eighth national title. This was a rematch of the previous two years' finals, which were split between UCLA and USC. The Bruins (32–3) were coached by Al Scates.

UCLA's Karch Kiraly was named Most Outstanding Player of the tournament. Kiraly, along with six other players, comprised the All-tournament team.

== Qualification ==
Until the creation of the NCAA Men's Division III Volleyball Championship in 2012, there was only a single national championship for men's volleyball. As such, all NCAA men's volleyball programs (whether from Division I, Division II, or Division III) were eligible. A total of 4 teams were invited to contest this championship.

Team	Appearance	Previous
Ohio State	6th	1980
Penn State	1st	Never
USC	4th	1980
UCLA	10th	1980

== Tournament bracket ==
- Site: UC Santa Barbara Events Center, Santa Barbara, California

Semifinals
UCLA (3)	15	15	15
Ohio State (0)	8	7	9
USC (3)	15	15	15
Penn State (0)	2	6	8

Championship
UCLA (3)	11	15	15	8	15
USC (2)	15	7	11	15	13
Third place
Ohio State (1)	15	15	7	8
Penn State (3)	17	10	15	15

== All tournament team ==
- Karch Kiraly, UCLA (Most outstanding player)
- Steve Gulnac, UCLA
- Steve Salmons, UCLA
- Tim Hovland, USC
- John Hedlund, USC
- Bill Stetson, USC
- Ahmet Ozacm, Penn State
