= 1971 NCAA men's volleyball tournament =

Tournament details
- Dates: May 1971
- Teams: 4

Final positions
- Champions: UCLA (2nd title)
- Runners-up: UC Santa Barbara
- Third place: Ball State
- Fourth place: Springfield

Tournament statistics
- Matches played: 10

Awards
- Best player: Kirk Kilgour (UCLA); Tim Bonynge (UCSB)

The 1971 NCAA men's volleyball tournament was the second annual tournament to determine the national champion of NCAA men's college volleyball. The tournament was played at Pauley Pavilion in Los Angeles, California. Like the previous year, the format of this championship consisted of a preliminary, four-team round robin to determine seeding for a subsequent single-elimination tournament.

UCLA defeated UC Santa Barbara, 3–0 (15–6, 17–15, 17–15), in the championship match to win their second consecutive national title. UCLA's Kirk Kilgour and UC Santa Barbara's Tim Bonynge were named the Most Outstanding Players of the tournament.

== Qualification ==
Until the creation of the NCAA Men's Division III Volleyball Championship in 2012, there was only a single national championship for men's volleyball. As such, all NCAA men's volleyball programs (whether from the University Division, or the College Division) were eligible. A total of 4 teams were invited to contest this championship.

Team	Appearance	Previous
Ball State	2nd	1970
Springfield	1st	Never
UCLA	2nd	1970
UC Santa Barbara	2nd	1970

== Round robin ==
Pos	Team	Pld	W	L	Pts	SW	SL	SR	SPW	SPL	SPR
1	UCLA	3	3	0	9	6	1	6.000	104	62	1.677
2	UC Santa Barbara	3	2	1	6	5	2	2.500	96	74	1.297
3	Ball State	3	1	2	3	2	4	0.500	60	75	0.800
4	Springfield	3	0	3	0	0	6	0.000	41	90	0.456

May 1971	UCLA	2–0	Springfield	Pauley Pavilion; Los Angeles, California
May 1971	(15–3, 15–4)			Pauley Pavilion; Los Angeles, California

May 1971	Ball State	0–2	UC Santa Barbara	Pauley Pavilion; Los Angeles, California
May 1971	(3–15, 8–15)			Pauley Pavilion; Los Angeles, California

May 1971	Ball State	0–2	UCLA	Pauley Pavilion; Los Angeles, California
May 1971	(7–15, 12–15)			Pauley Pavilion; Los Angeles, California

May 1971	Springfield	0–2	UC Santa Barbara	Pauley Pavilion; Los Angeles, California
May 1971	(7–15, 12–15)			Pauley Pavilion; Los Angeles, California

May 1971	UCLA	2–1	UC Santa Barbara	Pauley Pavilion; Los Angeles, California
May 1971	(15–11, 14–16, 15–9)			Pauley Pavilion; Los Angeles, California

May 1971	Ball State	2–0	Springfield	Pauley Pavilion; Los Angeles, California
May 1971	(15–3, 15–12)			Pauley Pavilion; Los Angeles, California

== Bracket ==
- Site: Pauley Pavilion, Los Angeles, California

Semifinals
1	UCLA (3)	15	15	15
4	Springfield (0)	6	1	3
2	UC Santa Barbara (3)	15	13	15	15
3	Ball State (1)	12	15	8	9

Championship
1	UCLA (3)	15	17	17
2	UC Santa Barbara (0)	6	15	15
Third place
3	Ball State (2)	15	15
4	Springfield (0)	4	6

== All tournament team ==
- Kirk Kilgour, UCLA (Co-Most Outstanding Player)
- Tom Bonynge, UC Santa Barbara (Co-Most Outstanding Player)
- Ed Machado, UCLA
- Dale Flannery, Ball State
- Jorn Oulie, UC Santa Barbara
- Larry Griebenow, UCLA
