= Don Shondell =

American volleyball coach (1929–2021)

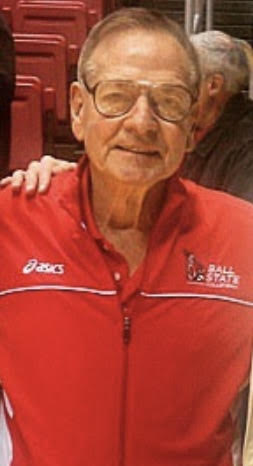

Biographical details
- Born: January 1, 1929 (age 97); Muncie, Indiana, U.S.
- Died: November 23, 2021; Muncie, Indiana
- Education: Ball State

Don Stuart Shondell (January 1, 1929 – November 23, 2021) was an American volleyball coach. He was the patriarch of one of the best known families in American volleyball. As the head coach of the Ball State Cardinals men's volleyball team he compiled a career record of 769–280–6 (.732), affording him the second highest number of wins in National Collegiate Athletic Association (NCAA) men's volleyball history, behind Al Scates of the University of California, Los Angeles.

== Coaching ==
Shondell graduated from Ball State University in 1952 and started Ball State's men's volleyball program in 1964. Shondell took a leave from the program in 1965 to complete a doctoral program at Indiana University Bloomington. As head coach of Ball State's men's volleyball program, he won 20 Midwestern Intercollegiate Volleyball Association (MIVA) titles in 34 seasons. In 1970, he led Ball State to the first NCAA Men's Volleyball Championship tournament. He later earned twelve more NCAA berths. Among his former players are Olympian Phil Eatherton and Walton.

Shondell was a co-founder of the MIVA, the organization's first president, and an eight-time MIVA coach of the year winner.

He retired as head coach of Ball State in 1998 and was replaced by Joel Walton, a former player and assistant coach. After retirement Shondell began coaching the Middle School volleyball team at Muncie Burris Laboratory School in Muncie, Indiana. He also coached youth volleyball in the Muncie area.

== Other works ==
Shondell was the co-author and editor of the Volleyball Coaching Bible.

== Personal life ==
Shondell was the father of Dave Shondell, the present head women's volleyball head coach at Purdue University, John Shondell, who is Dave's assistant at Purdue, and Steve Shondell, the former girls' volleyball coach at Burris Laboratory School and former head coach of the Ball State women's volleyball team.

Shondell was also the grandfather of former Tennessee women's player and current Youngstown State assistant coach Jasmine Fullove, former Purdue women's player Lindsay Shondell, and current Butler head coach Kyle Shondell.

Shondell died on November 23, 2021.
