= 2024 UC Irvine Anteaters men's volleyball team =

American college men's volleyball season

2024 UC Irvine Anteaters men's volleyball

Big West Tournament, Finals

NCAA Tournament, Final Four
- Conference: Big West Conference

Ranking
- Coaches: No. 4
- Record: 20–11 (7–3 Big West)
- Head coach: David Kniffin (12th season)
- Assistant coaches: Ron Larsen (1st season); Michael Brinkley (1st season); Scott Stadick (1st season)
- MVP: Hilir Henno
- Home stadium: Bren Events Center; Crawford Hall

The 2024 UC Irvine Anteaters men's volleyball team was the varsity intercollegiate volleyball program of the University of California, Irvine. The team's home venue is Bren Events Center located on campus in Irvine, California. They also play at Crawford Hall for smaller games. UCI has been a member of the Big West Conference since the 2017–18 season, when the league began sponsoring the sport. UC Irvine received an at-large bid to the NCAA tournament following a run to the Big West Finals, where they lost to Long Beach State. They ended the season falling 2–3 against eventual NCAA champion UCLA.

2024 Big West Conference men's volleyball standings
	Conf.				Overall
Team	W		L	PCT	W		L	PCT
No. 2 Long Beach State ‍†‍‡‍^{y}	9	–	1	.900	27	–	3	.900
No. 4 UC Irvine ‍‍‍^{y}	7	–	3	.700	20	–	11	.645
No. 5 Hawaii ‍‍‍	5	–	5	.500	23	–	7	.767
No. 20 UC San Diego ‍‍‍	4	–	6	.400	12	–	15	.444
No. 14 Cal State Northridge ‍‍‍	3	–	7	.300	13	–	16	.448
UC Santa Barbara ‍‍‍	2	–	8	.200	9	–	18	.333
† – Conference champion ‡ – Big West tournament champion y – Invited to the NCAA tournament Rankings from AVCA

== Previous season ==
Last season, UC Irvine finished with a 18–11 record, going 6–4 in the Big West, and finishing third in the conference. They did not receive an at-large bid to the NCAA tournament. The Anteaters ended their season losing 1–3 against Hawai'i in the Big West Tournament Finals.

== Preseason ==
=== Preseason All-Big West Team ===
Both the preseason All-Big West team, and the Big West Coaches' Poll were released on December 19, 2024.

Preseason All-Big West Team
Player	No.	Position	Class
Hilir Henno	20	Outside Hitter	Junior

=== Big West Coaches' Poll ===
Coaches' Poll
Pos.	Team	Points
1	Long Beach State	23 (3)
2	Hawai'i	21 (2)
3	UC Irvine	19 (1)
4	UC Santa Barbara	11
T-5	CSUN	8
T-5	UC San Diego	8

== Roster ==
2024 UC Irvine Anteaters Roster
Libero/Defensive Specialists: 1 Davis Lau - Graduate Student; 3 Cole Power - Graduate Student; 8 Gustavo Gomes - (redshirt) RS Junior; 30 Shane Aitken - Freshman; Setters: 4 Brett Sheward - Graduate Student; 7 Aidan Rigg – Freshman (also listed as an opposite hitter); 12 Joe Karlous - (redshirt) RS Senior; 22 Aidan Schulten - (redshirt) RS Freshman	Middle Blockers: 13 Beck Weber - (redshirt) RS Freshman; 17 Connor Campbell - Senior; 18 Nicolas Restrepo - Freshman; 23 Maxim Grigoriev - Sophomore	Outside Hitters: 2 Akhil Tangutur – Graduate Student; 9 Nolan Flexen – Junior; 10 Conner Dahm – (redshirt) RS Junior; 20 Hilir Henno - Junior; Opposite Hitters: 5 William D'Arcy – Sophomore; 11 Kobe Brown - Freshman; 14 Andon Kiriakou – Freshman

=== Coaches ===
2024 UC Irvine Anteaters Coaching Staff
- David Kniffin – head coach – 12th year
- Ron Larsen – assistant coach – 1st year
- Michael Brinkley – assistant coach – 1st year
- Scott Stadick – assistant coach – 1st year

== Schedule ==
Legend
	Anteaters win
	Anteaters loss
	Postponement
*	Non-Conference Game

2024 UC Irvine Anteaters Men's Volleyball Game Log (20–11)
Regular season (18–9)

January (5–2)
Date	TV	Opponent	Rank	Stadium	Score	Sets	Attendance	Overall	BWC
January 9	ESPN+	No. 19 George Mason*	No. 3	Crawford Hall; Irvine, California	2–3	(25–21, 22–25, 25–21, 23–25, 12–15)	409	0–1	–
January 10	ESPN+	St. Francis*	No. 3	Crawford Hall	3–0	(25–21, 25–23, 25–22)	400	1–1	—
January 13	ESPN+	No. 15 Princeton*	No. 3	Crawford Hall	3–1	(20–25, 25–17, 25–19, 25–18)	697	2–1	—
January 17	ESPN+	McKendree*	No. 6	Crawford Hall	3–0	(25–17, 25–19, 25–16)	424	3–1	—
January 26	BYUtv	at No. 8 BYU*	No. 7	Smith Fieldhouse; Provo, Utah	3–1	(22–25, 27–25, 25–18, 25–20)	3,662	4–1	—
January 27	BYUtv	at No. 8 BYU*	No. 7	Smith Fieldhouse	3–2	(23–25, 26–24, 25–18, 23–25, 15–13)	3,880	5–1	—
January 31	ESPN+	No. 5 UCLA*	No. 7	Bren Events Center; Irvine, California	2–3	(18–25, 15–25, 25–23, 25–21, 9–15)	2,644	5–2	—

February (5–2)
Date	TV	Opponent	Rank	Stadium	Score	Sets	Attendance	Overall	BWC
February 2	Pac-12.com	at No. 5 UCLA*	No. 7	Pauley Pavilion; Los Angeles, California	1–3	(23–25, 25–23, 26–28, 22–25)	1,917	5–3	—
February 7	ESPN+	No. 15 USC*	No. 7	Bren Events Center	3–1	(19–25, 25–22, 30–28, 27–25)	1,419	6–3	—
February 10	Pac-12.com	at No. 15 USC*	No. 7	Galen Center Los Angeles, California	1–3	(25–12, 22–25, 23–25, 14–25)	580	6–4	—
February 16	Pac-12.com	at No. 5 Stanford*	No. 7	Burnham Pavilion; Stanford, California	3–1	(28–26, 22–25, 25–19, 25–19)	615	7–4	—
February 17	Pac-12 Network	at No. 5 Stanford*	No. 7	Burnham Pavilion	3–1	(25–22, 25–22, 20–25, 25–21)	957	8–4	—
February 23	ESPN+	CUI*	No. 5	Crawford Hall	3–0	(25–22, 25–11, 25–21)	603	9–4	—
February 24	CUI Website	at CUI*	No. 5	CU Arena; Irvine, California	3–0	(25–20, 25–16, 25–20)	176	10–4	–

March (6–3)
Date	TV	Opponent	Rank	Stadium	Score	Sets	Attendance	Overall	BWC
March 1	ESPN+	at No. 18 UC San Diego	No. 5	LionTree Arena; La Jolla, California	3–0	(25–19, 25–19, 25–19)	810	11–4	1–0
March 3	ESPN+	No. 18 UC San Diego	No. 5	Crawford Hall	3–0	(25–20, 25–23, 25–19)	690	12–4	2–0
Outrigger Invitational
March 7	–	vs. No. 1 Grand Canyon*	No. 5	Stan Sheriff Center; Honolulu, Hawaii	3–2	(25–21, 19–25, 24–26, 29–27, 15–6)	–	13–4	—
March 8	–	vs. No. 14 Lewis*	No. 5	Stan Sheriff Center	2–3	(25–22, 19–25, 25–18, 20–25, 11–15)	–	13–5	—
March 10	ESPN+	vs. No. 3 Hawai'i*	No. 5	Stan Sheriff Center	2–3	(25–23, 19–25, 22–25, 25–17, 13–15)	7,558	13–6	—
March 13	ESPN+	No. 19 UC Santa Barbara	No. 5	Bren Events Center	3–0	(25–14, 25–22, 25–20)	843	14–6	3–0
March 15	–	at No. 19 UC Santa Barbara	No. 5	The Thunderdome; Santa Barbara, California	3–0	(25–20, 25–15, 25–22)	873	15–6	4–0
March 29	ESPN+	at No. 16 CSUN	No. 3	The Matadome; Northridge, California	1–3	(21–25, 21–25, 26–24, 18–25)	221	15–7	4–1
March 30	ESPN+	No. 16 CSUN	No. 3	Bren Events Center	3–0	(25–22, 25–21, 30–28)	758	16–7	5–1

April (2–2)
Date	TV	Opponent	Rank	Stadium	Score	Sets	Attendance	Overall	BWC
April 5	ESPN+	No. 4 Hawai'i	No. 5	Bren Events Center	3–0	(25–20, 25–19, 25–21)	2,058	17–7	6–1
April 6	ESPN+	No. 4 Hawai'i	No. 5	Bren Events Center	1–3	(25–22, 25–27, 18–25, 18–25)	2,600	17–8	6–2
April 12	ESPN+	No. 1 Long Beach State	No. 4	Bren Events Center	3–0	(25–17, 25–21, 25–21)	2,364	18–8	7–2
April 13	ESPN+	at No. 1 Long Beach State	No. 4	Walter Pyramid; Long Beach, California	0–3	(25–27, 21–25, 17–25)	4,006	18–9	7–3

Postseason (2–2)

2024 Big West Conference men's volleyball tournament (1–1)
Date	TV	Opponent	Rank	Stadium	Score	Sets	Attendance	Record	Postseason Record
April 19	ESPN+	vs. No. 5 Hawai'i (3); Semifinals	No. 3 (2)	Stan Sheriff Center; Honolulu, Hawai'i	3–0	(26–24, 36–34, 25–15)	6,400	19–9	1–0
April 20	ESPN+	vs. No. 2 Long Beach State (1); Finals	No. 3 (2)	Stan Sheriff Center	1–3	(23–25, 25–21, 16–25, 15–25)	2,334	19–10	1–1

2024 NCAA men's volleyball tournament (1–1)
Date	TV	Opponent	Rank	Stadium	Score	Sets	Attendance	Record	Postseason Record
April 30	NCAA.com	vs. No. 8 Penn State (5); First Round	No. 4 (4)	Walter Pyramid; Long Beach, California	3–0	(26–24, 25–16, 25–19)	3,024	20–10	1–0
May 2	NCAA.com	vs. No. 2 UCLA (1); Semifinals	No. 4 (4)	Walter Pyramid	2–3	(25–22, 20–25, 16–25, 25–18, 12–15)	3,786	20–11	1–1
*Non-conference game. ^{#}Rankings from AVCA Poll. (#) Tournament seedings in parentheses. All times are in Pacific.

== Awards and honors ==
=== Postseason ===
AVCA National Player of the Year
Honors	Player	Position	Date awarded
Player of the Year	Hilir Henno	Outside Hitter	April 28, 2024

AVCA All-Americans
Honors	Player	Position	Date awarded
First Team	Hilir Henno	Outside Hitter	April 28, 2024
Second Team	Cole Power	Libero	April 28, 2024
Second Team	Brett Sheward	Setter	April 28, 2024
Honorable Mention	Connor Campbell	Middle Blocker	April 28, 2024
Honorable Mention	Maxim Grigoriev	Middle Blocker	April 28, 2024

All-Big West Team
Honors	Player	Position	Date awarded
First Team	Maxim Grigoriev	Middle Blocker	April 17, 2025
First Team	Hilir Henno	Outside Hitter	April 17, 2025
First Team	Cole Power	Libero	April 17, 2025
First Team	Brett Sheward	Setter	April 17, 2025

== Rankings ==
Ranking movements Legend: ██ Increase in ranking ██ Decrease in ranking
	Week																	
Poll	Pre	1	2	3	4	5	6	7	8	9	10	11	12	13	14	15	16	Final
AVCA	4	3	6	7	7	7	7	5	5	5	5	4	3	5	4	3	4	4
