= 1973 NCAA men's volleyball tournament =

Tournament details
- Dates: May 1973
- Teams: 4

Final positions
- Champions: San Diego State (1st title)
- Runners-up: Long Beach State
- Third place: Ball State
- Fourth place: Army

Tournament statistics
- Matches played: 10
- Attendance: 13,412 (1,341 per match)

Awards
- Best player: Duncan McFarland (San Diego State)

The 1973 NCAA men's volleyball tournament was the fourth annual tournament to determine the national champion of NCAA men's college volleyball. The tournament occurred at Peterson Gym on the San Diego State University (SDSU) campus in San Diego, California. Like the previous year, this championship format consisted of a preliminary, four-team round-robin to determine seeding for a subsequent single-elimination tournament. The round-robin seeding games were played on Friday, May 25, at Peterson Gym. The semi-final and championship matches were held at the San Diego Sports Arena on Saturday, May 26.

Over 8,000 fans attended the championship match, which, at the time, was the largest crowd ever to witness a volleyball match in the United States.

San Diego State defeated Long Beach State, 3–1 (11–15, 15–13, 15–8, 15–6), in the championship match to win their first national title. San Diego State's Duncan McFarland was named the tournament's Most Outstanding Player.

== Qualification ==
The NCAA Men's Division III Volleyball Championship was created in 2012, and it is the only single national championship for men's volleyball. All NCAA men's volleyball programs (whether from the University Division or the College Division) were eligible. A total of 4 teams were invited to contest this championship.

Team	Appearance	Previous
Army	1st	Never
Ball State	4th	1972
Long Beach State	2nd	1970
San Diego State	2nd	1972

== Round robin ==
Pos	Team	Pld	W	L	Pts	SW	SL	SR	SPW	SPL	SPR
1	Long Beach State	3	3	0	9	6	1	6.000	100	58	1.724
2	San Diego State	3	2	1	6	5	3	1.667	112	83	1.349
3	Ball State	3	1	2	3	3	4	0.750	84	88	0.955
4	Army	3	0	3	0	0	6	0.000	23	90	0.256

May 1973	Ball State	0–2	Long Beach State	Peterson Gym; San Diego, California
May 1973	(11–15, 7–15)			Peterson Gym; San Diego, California

May 1973	Army	0–2	San Diego State	Peterson Gym; San Diego, California
May 1973	(1–15, 6–15)			Peterson Gym; San Diego, California

May 1973	Ball State	1–2	San Diego State	Peterson Gym; San Diego, California
May 1973	(19–17, 12–15, 5–15)			Peterson Gym; San Diego, California

May 1973	Army	0–2	Long Beach State	Peterson Gym; San Diego, California
May 1973	(2–15, 3–15)			Peterson Gym; San Diego, California

May 1973	Army	0–2	Ball State	Peterson Gym; San Diego, California
May 1973	(4–15, 7–15)			Peterson Gym; San Diego, California

May 1973	Long Beach State	2–1	San Diego State	Peterson Gym; San Diego, California
May 1973	(10–15, 15–13, 15–7)			Peterson Gym; San Diego, California

== Bracket ==
- Site: San Diego Sports Arena, San Diego, California

Semifinals
1	Long Beach State (3)	15	15	15
4	Army (0)	5	1	2
2	San Diego State (3)	15	15	15
3	Ball State (0)	5	7	10

Championship
1	Long Beach State (1)	15	13	8	6
2	San Diego State (3)	11	15	15	15
Third place
3	Ball State (2)	15	15
4	Army	7	8

== All tournament team ==
- Duncan McFarland, San Diego State (Most Outstanding Player)
- Chris Marlowe, San Diego State
- Randy Stevenson, San Diego State
- Dodge Parker, Long Beach State
- Miles Pabst, Long Beach State
- Dave Schakel, Ball State
