= 2024 Big West Conference men's volleyball tournament =

West Conference volleyball tournament

2024 Big West Conference Men's Volleyball Tournament
- Classification: Division I/II
- Teams: 6
- Site: Stan Sheriff Center; Honolulu, Hawai'i
- Champions: Long Beach State (2nd title)
- Winning coach: Alan Knipe (2nd title)
- MVP: Clarke Godbold (Long Beach State)
- Attendance: 14,821 (4,940 per match)
- Television: ESPN+
- Big West Conference Men's Volleyball Tournaments

2024 Big West Conference men's volleyball standings
	Conf.				Overall
Team	W		L	PCT	W		L	PCT
No. 2 Long Beach State ‍†‍‡‍^{y}	9	–	1	.900	27	–	3	.900
No. 4 UC Irvine ‍‍‍^{y}	7	–	3	.700	20	–	11	.645
No. 5 Hawaii ‍‍‍	5	–	5	.500	23	–	7	.767
No. 20 UC San Diego ‍‍‍	4	–	6	.400	12	–	15	.444
No. 14 Cal State Northridge ‍‍‍	3	–	7	.300	13	–	16	.448
UC Santa Barbara ‍‍‍	2	–	8	.200	9	–	18	.333
† – Conference champion ‡ – Big West tournament champion y – Invited to the NCAA tournament Rankings from AVCA

The 2024 Big West Conference men's volleyball tournament is a postseason men's volleyball tournament for the Big West Conference during the 2024 NCAA Division I & II men's volleyball season. It was held April 18 through April 20, 2024 at the Stan Sheriff Center in Honolulu, Hawai'i. Long Beach State received the conference's automatic bid to the 2024 NCAA Volleyball Tournament, and UC Irvine received one of the two at-large bids. Notably, the second set in the semifinals matchup between UC Irvine and Hawai'i produced the highest point set in Big West Conference men's volleyball tournament history.

== Seeds ==
All six teams were eligible for the postseason, with the top two seeds receiving byes to the semifinals. Teams were seeded by record within the conference, with a tiebreaker system to seed teams with identical conference records.

Seed	School	Conference	Tiebreaker
1	Long Beach State	9-1	–
2	UC Irvine	7-3	–
3	Hawai'i	5-5	–
4	UC San Diego	4-8	–
5	CSUN	3-7	–
6	UC Santa Barbara	2-8	–

== Schedule and results ==
The entire tournament was televised on Spectrum Hawai'i and simulcast live on ESPN+.

Time Network	Matchup	Score	Attendance	Broadcasters
Quarterfinals – Thursday, April 18
4:30 pm ESPN+	No. 4 UC San Diego vs. No. 5 CSUN	0-3 (20-25, 26-28, 22-25)	6,087	Kanoa Leahey & Chris McLachlin
7:00 pm ESPN+	No. 3 Hawai'i vs. No. 6 UC Santa Barbara	3-1 (23-25, 25-20, 25-17, 25-23)	6,087	Kanoa Leahey & Chris McLachlin
Semifinals – Friday, April 19
4:30 pm ESPN+	No. 1 Long Beach State vs. No. 5 CSUN	3-1 (25-23, 22-25, 25-20, 25-22)	6,400	Kanoa Leahey & Chris McLachlin
7:00 pm ESPN+	No. 2 UC Irvine vs. No. 3 Hawai'i	3-0 (26-24, 36-34, 25-15)	6,400	Kanoa Leahey & Chris McLachlin
Championship – Saturday, April 20
7:00 pm ESPN+	No. 1 Long Beach State vs. No. 2 UC Irvine	3-1 (25-23, 21-25, 25-16, 25-15)	2,334	Paul Sunderland & Kevin Barnett
Game times are HST. Rankings denote tournament seeding.

== Bracket ==
Quarterfinals; Thursday, April 18
4	UC San Diego	0
5	CSUN	3
3	Hawai'i	3
6	UC Santa Barbara	1

Semifinals; Friday, April 19
1	Long Beach State	3
5	CSUN	1
2	UC Irvine	3
3	Hawai'i	0

Championship; Saturday, April 20
1	Long Beach State	3
2	UC Irvine	1
