= Suwara =

Suwara is a surname. Notable people with the surname include:

- Ernie Suwara (born 1945), American volleyball player
- Rudy Suwara (born 1941), American volleyball player
- Wiktor Suwara (born 1996), Polish athlete
