= Steve Shondell =

American volleyball player and coach

Steve Shondell is a retired American volleyball coach.

== Family ==
Shondell's father, Dr. Don Shondell, was the head coach at Ball State University in Muncie for 34 seasons, and is a charter member of the AVCA Hall of Fame. Shondell played for his father at Ball State from 1974 to 1977 before becoming head coach at Muncie Burris. Shondell's brother Dave Shondell is the head coach of the women's volleyball team at Purdue University, his brother John is currently an assistant coach for the women's volleyball team at the University of Wisconsin, and his nephew, Kyle, is currently the head women's volleyball coach at Butler University.

== Ball State ==
Shondell was hired by Ball State University as Head Women's Volleyball Coach on April 13, 2010. In his first season as the Cardinals' head coach, Shondell was named the Mid-American Conference Coach of the Year after guiding the team to a 24–5 (14–2 MAC) record and the program's first MAC Regular Season title since 2002. The Cardinals also enjoyed national attention during the season, appearing on the front page of ESPN.com's College Sports section in a Nov. 18, 2010 story by Dave Reed.

== Muncie Burris ==
Shondell has amassed 1,183 wins in 34 years as head coach at Burris Laboratory School in Muncie, Indiana. According to the National Federation of High Schools Sports Record Book, Shondell's win total ranks in the top ten nationally in the history of high school girls’ volleyball. With only 95 losses in those 34 years, Shondell has an overall winning percentage of .926.

Shondell's Owls have won four national championships (plus runners-up nationally four times), 21 Indiana State Volleyball Championships, including the current streak of 14 consecutive in 2A since the state went to class systems in 1997. He has been named Indiana coach of the year 10 times, and was a national coach of the year finalist many years in the past 25 years and was named PrepVolleyball.com's National Coach of the Year in 2009. In Shondell's 34 years, Muncie Burris has gone undefeated seven times.

Shondell is a contributor to the Volleyball Coaching Bible.

== Club Munciana ==
Shondell is a founding member of Munciana, a volleyball club for 12- through 18-year-old girls. Steve coached the 14-year-old open club (Chipmunks) until 1996, and now coaches the 12-year-old club (Peppers). In addition to AAU titles, the Chipmunks won Junior Olympic National Championships in 1989, 1990, and 1996, and appeared in the finals in 1992. The Peppers won the Junior Olympic National Championship in 2006. The 1989 title was Munciana's first USAV National Championship. In 2008, the 18's Samurai finished as runners-up at the JVDA 18 Open Division National Championships in Louisville, Kentucky.

== Awards and honors ==
- 2010 – Mid-American Conference Coach of the Year
- 2009 – PrepVolleyball.com's National Coach of the Year
- 2007 – AVCA Hall of Fame
- 2005 – Ball State University Athletic Hall of Fame
- 1996 – Indiana Volleyball Hall of Fame
