= Ken Yankelevitz =

American video game controller designer (1942–2016)

- Yankelevitz (top) fitting a custom controller for a disabled child in 1983
- Born: Kenneth Stanley Yankelevitz; 1942
- Died: 2016 (aged 73–74)
- Occupations: Flight systems engineer Controller designer
- Employer: McDonnell Douglas
- Spouse: Diane (m. 1964)
- Children: 2
- Website: QuadControl.com (archived)

Kenneth Stanley Yankelevitz (1942–2016) was an American aerospace engineer and video game controller designer. He was a flight systems engineer at McDonnell Douglas and among the first to develop controllers for quadriplegics, who have no or limited control over all four limbs. He began building custom mouth based Atari 2600 controllers for clients in 1981, when Atari began referring players with disabilities to him. He founded KY Enterprises which developed controllers to accommodate a wide range of disabilities. Yankelevitz sold his products at cost and turned little profit. He developed disability accommodating controllers for increasingly more complicated video game systems for over 30 years before handing the torch to Fred Davidson, producer of the QuadStick, in 2014.

== Personal life ==
Yankelevitz was born in 1942 to Bee and Lewis Yankelevitz. He married his wife Diane on February 6, 1964. They moved to Long Beach, California and he began work as a flight systems engineer at McDonnell Douglas, an aerospace manufacturer and defense contractor. In 2005, Ken and Diane moved to Bozeman, Montana after retirement. Yankelevitz died in 2016.

== Career ==
In his spare time, Yankelevitz reverse engineered Atari CX40 joysticks (designed for the Atari 2600 then known as the VCS) and approached Atari management with his own design he saw as more robust. In 1981, Atari began referring him to quadriplegics looking to play their Atari 2600. According to Yankelevitz, "Atari referred me to a teenage quadriplegic in Pennsylvania who wanted to play video games [...] He was depressed and his family and church were searching for something to spark his interest in living after his accident." Soon after, he was contacted by Rancho Los Amigos National Rehabilitation Center to work with Kirk Kilgour, a former star volleyball player who had been paralyzed from the neck down just prior to an appearance at the Olympics. He designed an Atari 2600 controller that had a joystick operated by the mouth and a blow sensor to operate the action button.

A mouth controller from KY Enterprises as seen in 1983.

Yankelevitz founded KY Enterprises to begin selling his controllers. At the time he was the first and only producer of controllers for quadriplegics in North America. He sold his controllers at cost without turning a profit and had loaned or donated at least 100 to individuals and institutions by 1983. Yankelevitz said "how can you show a little kid who is disabled how to use a video game and then take the unit away because his parents can't afford to buy one?" Many therapists and psychiatrists applauded the controllers for providing patients with recreation, muscle stimulation, and improved self esteem. Yankelevitz also designed a button based controller called the Fingertip Controller designed for people with arthritis and cerebral palsy, it was also sold as alternative for able-bodied players.

The Fingertip Controller from KY Enterprises

Yankelevitz designed controllers that were specialized for individual clients, many of which came from Rancho Los Amigos. KY Enterprises was operated almost exclusively by Yankelevitz with help from his wife and two daughters. He described the entire operation as "an expensive hobby." Eventually the controllers became known as the QuadControl joysticks. In 1986, he attended the second annual conference on computer technology and the disabled at California State University, Northridge in which he demonstrated a method of controlling a computer by moving the muscles in his forehead. Yankelevitz continued to adapt his designs over the years as video game controller design became more complicated. He produced mouth controllers for various video game consoles for over 30 years.

== Legacy ==
In 2011, Yankelevitz turned 70 and many members of the disabled community began to worry about his increasing age. Mouth controllers had never been adopted by the commercial industry and many considered KY Enterprises products to be the only competitive option on the market both in terms of accessibility and price. Yankelevitz had already retired from his career in aerospace and began closing his operations for half of the year. AP News began running syndicated news story in local newspapers about the dilemma in 2011, which were read by former Cisco employee Fred Davidson. He began working to create his own design in association with quadriplegic gamer Matt Victor. Davidson created a Kickstarter for the QuadStick, a successor to Yankelevitz's designs. The Kickstarter was successful and the product launched in 2014.
