= 1970 NCAA men's volleyball tournament =

Tournament details
- Dates: May 1970
- Teams: 4

Final positions
- Champions: UCLA (1st title)
- Runners-up: Long Beach State
- Third place: UC Santa Barbara
- Fourth place: Ball State

Tournament statistics
- Matches played: 10
- Attendance: 3,143 (314 per match)

Awards
- Best player: Dane Holtzman (UCLA)

The 1970 NCAA men's volleyball tournament was the first annual tournament to determine the national champion of NCAA men's college volleyball. The tournament was played at Pauley Pavilion in Los Angeles, California.

UCLA defeated Long Beach State in the championship match (3 sets to 0) to win their first national title. UCLA's Dane Holtzman was named Most Outstanding Player of the tournament.

== Qualification ==
Until the creation of the NCAA Men's Division III Volleyball Championship in 2012, there was only a single national championship for men's volleyball. As such, all NCAA men's volleyball programs (whether from the University Division, or the College Division) were eligible. A total of 4 teams were invited to contest this championship.

Team	Appearance	Last Bid
Ball State	1st	Never
Long Beach State	1st	Never
UCLA	1st	Never
UC Santa Barbara	1st	Never

== Results ==
=== Round robin ===
Pos	Team	Pld	W	L	Pts	SW	SL	SR	SPW	SPL	SPR
1	UCLA	3	3	0	9	6	1	6.000	103	54	1.907
2	Long Beach State	3	2	1	6	5	2	2.500	91	88	1.034
3	Ball State	3	1	2	3	2	5	0.400	71	99	0.717
4	UC Santa Barbara	3	0	3	0	1	6	0.167	72	95	0.758

Date	Time		Score		Set 1	Set 2	Set 3	Set 4	Set 5	Total	Report
–	–	UCLA	2–0	UC Santa Barbara	15–6	15–10				30–16	
–	–	Ball State	0–2	Long Beach State	15–11	17–15				32–26	
–	–	Ball State	0–2	UCLA	4–15	6–15				10–30	
–	–	Long Beach State	2–0	UC Santa Barbara	15–9	15–10				30–19	
–	–	Ball State	2–1	UC Santa Barbara	15–9	5–15	15–13			35–37	
–	–	Long Beach State	1–2	UCLA	12–15	15–13	8–15			35–43	

=== Bracket ===
Semifinals
1	UCLA (3)	15	15	15
4	UC Santa Barbara (0)	10	13	8
2	Long Beach State (3)	16	6	15	15
3	Ball State (1)	14	15	10	6

Championship
1	UCLA (3)	15	15	15
2	Long Beach State (0)	7	4	8
Third place
4	UC Santa Barbara (2)	15	15
3	Ball State (0)	4	4

== All tournament team ==
- Dane Holtzman, UCLA (Most Outstanding Player)
- Kirk Kilgour, UCLA
- Ed Becker, UCLA
- Dodger Parker, Long Beach State
- Craig Foley, Long Beach State
- Tom Bonynge, UC Santa Barbara
