= Dave Shondell =

American volleyball player (born 1958)

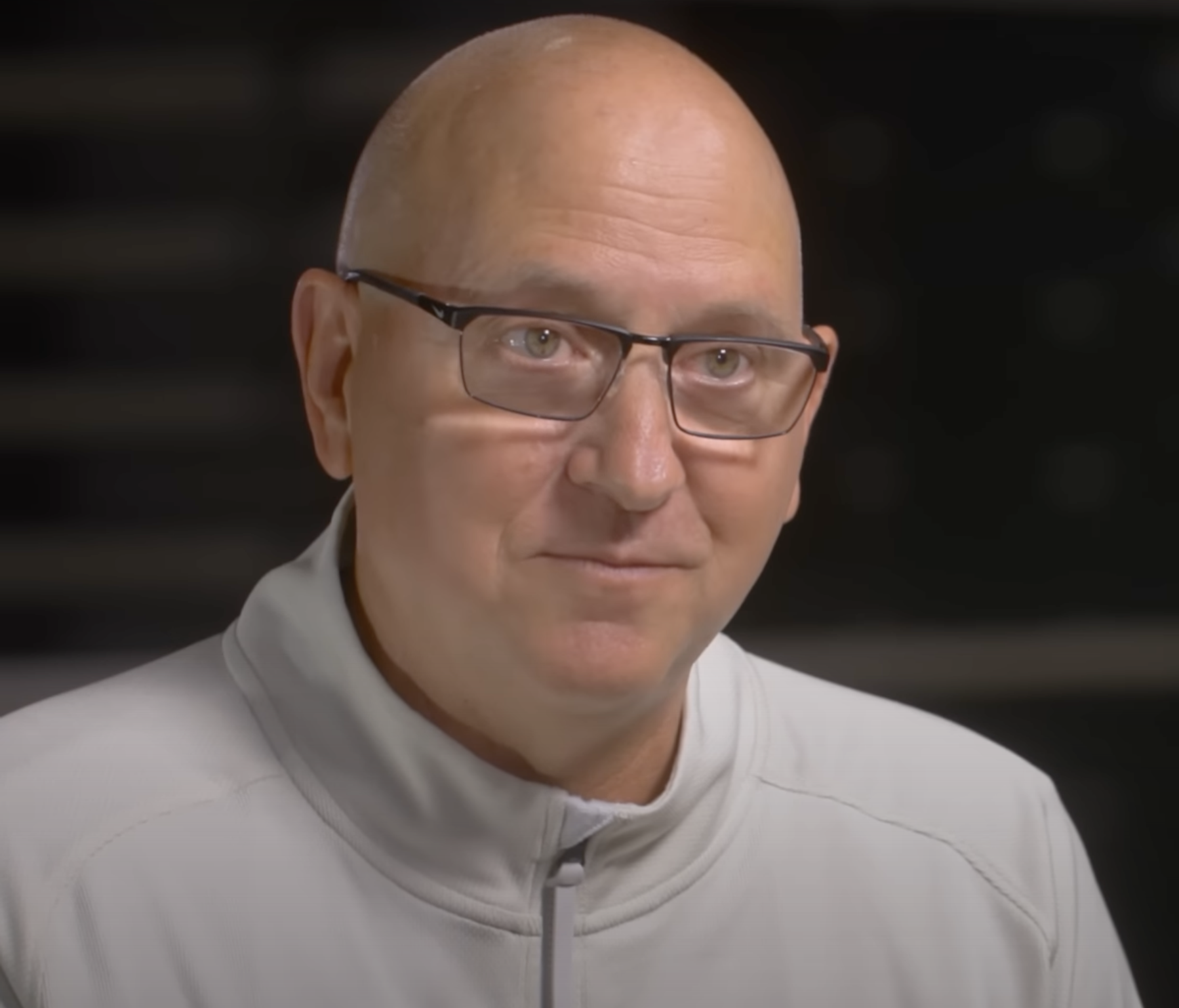

Current position
- Title: Head coach
- Team: Purdue
- Conference: Big Ten
- Record: 532–248 (.682)

Biographical details
- Born: January 17, 1958 (age 68); Muncie, Indiana
- Education: Ball State

Coaching career (HC unless noted)
- 1980-81: Ball State (asst.)
- 1981-1988: Daleville HS
- 1998-1999: USA Junior National Team (asst.)
- 1990-2002: Muncie Central HS
- 2003–Present: Purdue

Head coaching record
- Overall: 532–248 (.682)

Accomplishments and honors

Awards
- 2x Big Ten Coach of the Year (2011, 2021) AVCA Midwest Region Coach of the Year (2025) AVCA Northeast Region Coach of the Year (2021)

Dave Shondell (born January 17, 1958) is the head women's volleyball coach at Purdue University.

Shondell was raised in Muncie, Indiana. He began his career at Daleville High School in Daleville, Indiana, just outside Muncie. After his tenure there, he then moved to Muncie Central High School, in Muncie. While at Muncie Central and Daleville, he earned about 600 wins with roughly a .850 winning percentage, 4 state championships, and a mythical national runner-up. He was also recognized as the 2002 National Coach of the Year by Prepvolleyball.com. He took over as director the Munciana Volleyball Club while at Muncie Central. Munciana earned almost 20 national championships under Shondell's direction. It is still known as one of the premier volleyball clubs in the country. In 2003, he accepted the Women's Volleyball coaching job at Purdue University. In his twenty-two years at Purdue, Shondell has accumulated over 450 victories, eighteen NCAA Tournament berths, eleven trips to the Sweet Sixteen, and four trips to the Elite Eight.

== Head coaching record ==
Throughout his career at Purdue University, Shondell has gradually enhanced the program's Big Ten standings.

Record table
Season	Team	Overall	Conference	Standing	Postseason
Purdue Boilermakers (Big Ten Conference) (2003–Present)
2003	Purdue	14–17	7–13	8th	
2004	Purdue	17–15	9–11	T–6th	NCAA second round
2005	Purdue	25–9	12–8	5th	NCAA regional semifinal
2006	Purdue	23–11	11–9	5th	NCAA regional semifinal
2007	Purdue	19–14	11–9	T–3rd	NCAA second round
2008	Purdue	26–9	13–7	4th	NCAA regional semifinal
2009	Purdue	14–17	6–14	T–7th	
2010	Purdue	24–11	12–8	T–4th	NCAA regional final
2011	Purdue	29–5	16–4	T–2nd	NCAA regional semifinal
2012	Purdue	23–11	12–8	5th	NCAA regional semifinal
2013	Purdue	23–12	11–9	6th	NCAA regional final
2014	Purdue	22–10	12–8	T–5th	
2015	Purdue	23–10	13–7	5th	NCAA second round
2016	Purdue	19–14	8–12	10th	NCAA second round
2017	Purdue	23–10	12–8	5th	NCAA second round
2018	Purdue	24–9	12–8	6th	NCAA second round
2019	Purdue	24–8	14–6	5th	NCAA regional semifinal
2020	Purdue	16–7	14–6	5th	NCAA regional final
2021	Purdue	26–7	15–5	T–3rd	NCAA regional final
2022	Purdue	21–11	11–9	6th	NCAA second round
2023	Purdue	23–9	15–5	T–3rd	NCAA regional semifinals
2024	Purdue	27–7	16–4	4th	NCAA regional semifinals
2025	Purdue	27–7	15–5	3rd	NCAA regional final
2026	Purdue	20–8	11–6	T–5th	TBD
Purdue:		532–248 (.682)	276–169 (.620)		
Total:		532–248 (.682)			

== Family ==
Shondell is part of one of the most well-known families in volleyball.

Shondell is the son of Dr. Don Shondell. Shondell's brother is Steve Shondell, former head women's volleyball coach at Ball State University. Shondell's other brother, John, was one of his longtime assistants at Purdue. John's daughter Allie played under Shondell at Purdue. Shondell's youngest child Kyle is the head coach at Butler.
