= Carol Dewey =

American volleyball coach

- Occupation: volleyball coach

Carol Dewey is an American volleyball coach. She became the first head coach of Purdue University's women's volleyball team in 1975. She retired in 1994. After retiring as a head coach, Dewey worked as a compliance and academic officer.

== Early life ==
Dewey is from Brecksville, Ohio. In 1967, she graduated from Muskingum College.

== Career ==
=== Playing ===
As a player, she was on the 1975 U.S. National Team. Dewey was also a part of the E. Pluribus Unum team in 1972 and 1973, winning national championships both years.

=== Coaching ===
Dewey coached at Purdue University for 20 years, from 1975 to 1994. The program became the first women's revenue sport at Purdue University.

Under Dewey, Purdue's team produced five All-Americans, six Academic All-Americans, and 39 players that received the All-Big Ten award. She also coached three teams that won Big Ten titles, in 1980, 1982, and 1985.

In her ninth season as Purdue's head coach, Dewey led Purdue to an undefeated regular season. They finished the season ranked eighth in the country.

Dewey remained with Purdue after retiring from coaching, working as a compliance and academic officer from 1995 to 2000. She retired with an overall record of 469–256, a Purdue record for wins for a single sport coach.

== Accomplishments ==
Dewey was inducted into the Purdue Intercollegiate Athletics Hall of Fame in 2003. In 2005, she was inducted into the American Volleyball Coaches Association Hall of Fame.

She received the Bertha Lucas All-Time Great Coach Award from USA Volleyball. Dewey was a three-time Big Ten Coach of the Year, achieving the honor in 1982, 1985, and 1987.

== Head coaching record ==
Record table
Season	Team	Overall	Conference	Standing	Postseason
Purdue University (Big Ten) (1975–1994)
1975	Purdue University	15-16	-		
1976	Purdue University	21-16	-		
1977	Purdue University	25-11	-		
1978	Purdue University	38-9	-		
1979	Purdue University	33-16	-		
1980	Purdue University	38-15	-		
1981	Purdue University	34-8	-		
1982	Purdue University	33-1	-		
1983	Purdue University	26-6	-		
1984	Purdue University	25-12	-		
1985	Purdue University	34-4	-		
1986	Purdue University	19-16	-		
1987	Purdue University	24-14	-		
1988	Purdue University	19-15	-		
1989	Purdue University	13-20	-		
1990	Purdue University	21-11	-		
1991	Purdue University	13-16	-		
1992	Purdue University	17-30	-		
1993	Purdue University	15-14	-		
1994	Purdue University	6-23	-		
Total:					
National champion Postseason invitational champion Conference regular season champion Conference regular season and conference tournament champion Division regular season champion Division regular season and conference tournament champion Conference tournament champion
