= Burris Laboratory School =

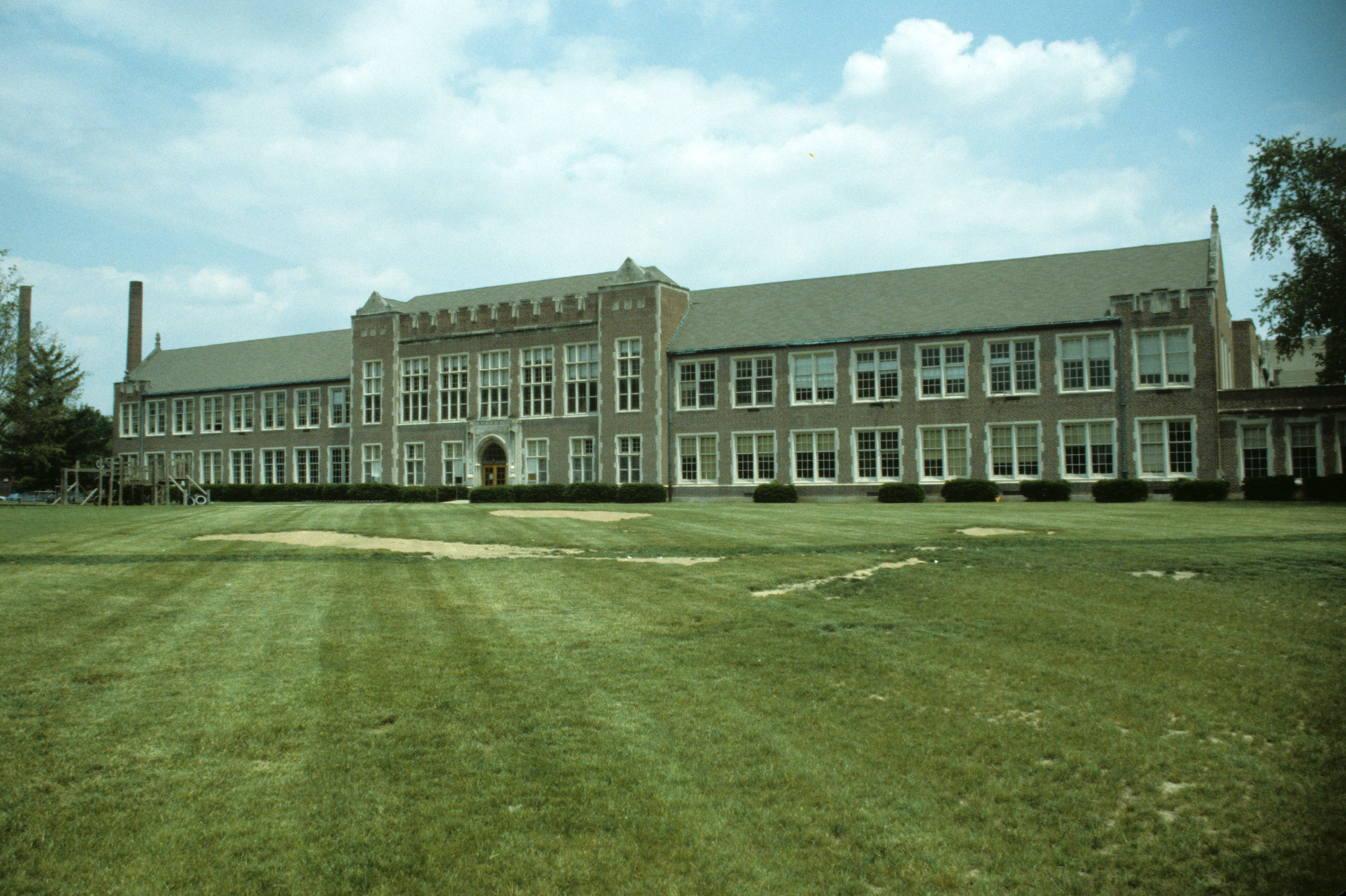

Location
- 2201 West University Avenue; Muncie, Indiana 47306; United States; 40°11′48″N 85°24′44″W

Information
- School type: Public laboratory school
- Sister school: Indiana Academy for Science, Mathematics, and Humanities
- Superintendent: Jeremy Coleman
- Principal: Abigail Comber
- Staff: 52.00 (FTE)
- Grades: K–12
- Enrollment: 668 (2023–2024)
- Student to teacher ratio: 12.85
- Color
- Athletics conference: Pioneer Conference
- Nickname: Owls
- Website: Official website

Burris Laboratory School is a kindergarten through twelfth grade public laboratory school located on the west side of Muncie, Indiana. The school is a division of Ball State University and provides University pre-service teachers an opportunity for classroom observation and practice. The school also shares a campus with the Indiana Academy for Science, Mathematics, and Humanities. Currently Burris has implemented a system for middle school called impact.

== History ==
The school was established in 1929 and is named after Benjamin J. Burris, the first president of what was then known as Ball Teachers College. Originally part of the Muncie school district, it became independent in 1974. Its district is now coterminous with the entire state of Indiana. Students are admitted via a lottery system.

== Athletics ==
Burris Laboratory School was affiliated with the Mid-Eastern Conference (MEC) from 1979 through the 2013/2014 school year, with the Owl serving as the school's mascot. Burris has a girls' volleyball program with four national championships, and 21 state championships, 14 of which are consecutive. Starting in the 2014–2015 school year, the school is a member of the Pioneer Conference.

State Championships

Taken from IHSAA State Championship History

Sport	Year(s)
Boys Track (1)	1943
Volleyball (23)	1982, 1985, 1986, 1989, 1990, 1992, 1993, 1994, 1997(2A), 1998(2A), 1999(2A), 2000(2A), 2001(2A), 2002(2A), 2003(2A), 2004(2A), 2005(2A), 2006(2A), 2007(2A), 2008(2A), 2009(2A), 2010(2A), 2023 (2A)

== Notable alumni ==
- Greg Adams, music writer and reissue producer (class of 1988)
- Angelin Chang, Grammy Award-winning classical pianist and music educator
- S. T. Joshi, award-winning literary scholar and editor (Class of 1976)
- Patrick Tovatt, actor (class of 1959)

== See also ==
- List of high schools in Indiana
