= Joey Vrazel =

American volleyball player and coach

JoEllen “Joey” Vrazel is an American former volleyball player and volleyball coach.

== Career ==
=== Playing ===
Joey Vrazel received 18 scholarships to play volleyball, and accepted a partial scholarship offer at Utah State.

Vrazel played volleyball for Texas A&M. She was a five time All-American there. Vrazel graduated with a degree in physical education in 1984.

She was on the USA National team twice. She also played for Utah State University's national championship team in 1978 and a second place finish the following year. She also played professionally for the New York Liberties from 1987 to 1989.

=== Coaching ===
==== California State University ====
Vrazel was an assistant coach for four years at California State University, Fresno.

==== Washington ====
Vrazel was an assistant coach from 1984 to 1988 at the University of Washington.

==== Purdue ====
Joey Vrazel was hired as the Purdue women's volleyball head coach on February 22, 1995. In her first season as head coach, the team was 16th in the country for attendance, averaging 1,351 fans per game. The next year, seven Boilermakers were named Academic All-Big Ten, a school record. During the 1997 season, the team won its 500th match.

She announced her resignation after her best season coaching, and caught the team and associate athletic director off guard. The former players were not as surprised, with one player expressing that she reported Vrazel's actions to the administration. She recounted on incident in which the coach made them pick up sticks in the woods, tell them their problems, and then burn them to make the problems go away.

The first three seasons of coaching at Purdue were 8-20, 13-19, and 10-21 respectively.

==== Clemson ====
Vrazel was named an assistant coach at Clemson University on March 31, 2000. As an assistant coach she is responsible for administrative duties, facilitating communication between the coaching staff and strength staff, and leading the team's conditioning and nutritional programs.
