= Kirk Kilgour =

American volleyball player (1947–2002)

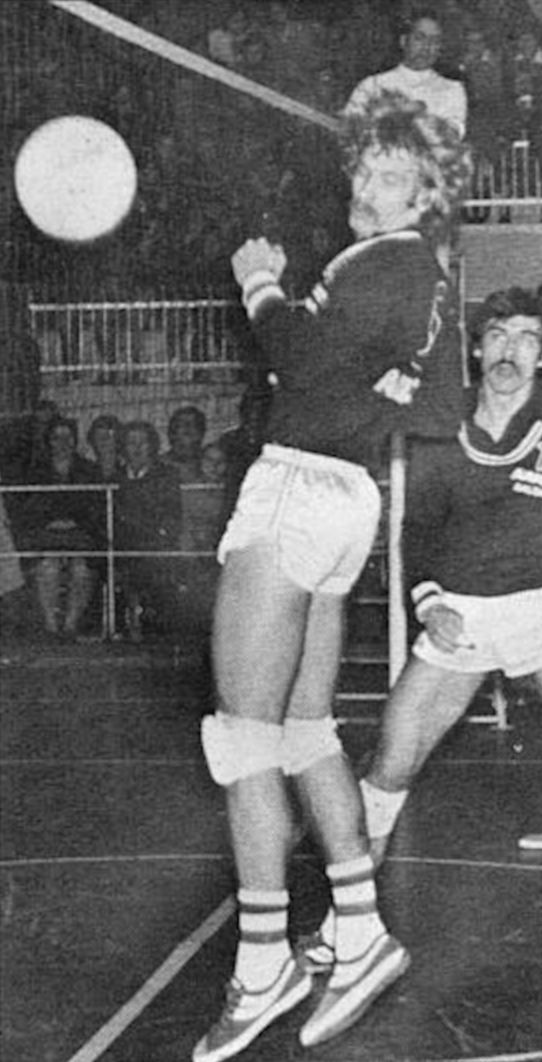
- Kilgour playing for Ariccia in the mid-1970s

Personal information
- Born: December 28, 1947 Los Angeles, California
- Died: July 10, 2002 (aged 54) Denver, Colorado
Medal record
Men's volleyball
Representing the United States
Pan American Games
Silver medal – second place	1971 Cali	Team

Kirk Kilgour (December 28, 1947 – July 10, 2002) was an American volleyball player and disability advocate. He went to high school at Mira Costa High in Manhattan Beach, California. He was an all-star basketball player in junior college and switched to volleyball at the suggestion of then UCLA head coach Al Scates. He was best known for his spiking and led UCLA to its first national championship in 1970. He also helped UCLA win the championship in 1971 and was a three time All-American player. In 1971, he played in the Pan American Games for the United States. He planned to compete in the 1976 Summer Olympics in Montreal.

On January 9, 1976, while playing for an Italian volleyball team in preparation for the Olympics, he landed poorly during a tumbling exercise and broke his neck. He was sent to a hospital in Rome where he underwent surgery and was placed inside an iron lung. Kilgour's spinal cord had snapped leaving him paralyzed from the neck down. He became quadriplegic and wheelchair bound, ending his volleyball playing career. He later became a volleyball coach at Pepperdine University in Malibu, California and a television sports commentator providing commentary for the 1984, 1992, and 1996 Summer Olympics. Kilguor died of pneumonia on July 10, 2002 at Mediplex Specialty Hospital in Thornton, Colorado. He was 54 years old.

== Other work ==
Kilgour was an avid video game player who tasked McDonnell Douglas engineer Ken Yankelevitz to develop a mouth controlled joystick for the Atari 2600 designed for quadriplegics. Yankelevitz began donating hundreds of mouth controllers and formed a company called KY Enterprises to sell his controller designs. Kilgour gave a talk at the second annual conference on computer technology and the disabled at California State University, Northridge in which he demonstrated a computer recognizing voice activated commands. Kilgour also worked as a consultant on Extreme Ghostbusters.
