= 1972 NCAA men's volleyball tournament =

Tournament details
- Dates: May 1972
- Teams: 4

Final positions
- Champions: UCLA (3rd title)
- Runners-up: San Diego State
- Third place: Ball State
- Fourth place: UC Santa Barbara

Tournament statistics
- Matches played: 10

Awards
- Best player: Dick Irvin (UCLA)

The 1972 NCAA men's volleyball tournament was the third annual tournament to determine the national champion of NCAA men's college volleyball. The tournament was played at Irving Gymnasium at Ball State University in Muncie, Indiana. Like the previous year, the format of this championship consisted of a preliminary, four-team round robin to determine seeding for a subsequent single-elimination tournament.

UCLA defeated San Diego State, 3–2 (10–15, 9–15, 15–9, 15–10, 15–7), in the championship match to win their third consecutive national title. UCLA's Dick Irvin was named the Most Outstanding Player of the tournament.

== Qualification ==
Until the creation of the NCAA Men's Division III Volleyball Championship in 2012, there was only a single national championship for men's volleyball. As such, all NCAA men's volleyball programs (whether from the University Division, or the College Division) were eligible. A total of 4 teams were invited to contest this championship.

| Team | Appearance | Previous |
|---|---|---|
| Ball State | 3rd | 1971 |
| San Diego State | 1st | Never |
| UCLA | 3rd | 1971 |
| UC Santa Barbara | 3rd | 1971 |

== Round robin ==
| Pos | Team | Pld | W | L | Pts | SW | SL | SR | SPW | SPL | SPR |
|---|---|---|---|---|---|---|---|---|---|---|---|
| 1 | UCLA | 3 | 2 | 1 | 6 | 4 | 2 | 2.000 | 78 | 55 | 1.418 |
| 2 | UC Santa Barbara | 3 | 2 | 1 | 6 | 4 | 2 | 2.000 | 80 | 75 | 1.067 |
| 3 | San Diego State | 3 | 2 | 1 | 6 | 4 | 3 | 1.333 | 89 | 76 | 1.171 |
| 4 | Ball State | 3 | 0 | 3 | 0 | 1 | 6 | 0.167 | 55 | 96 | 0.573 |

| May 1972 | Ball State | 1–2 | San Diego State | Irving Gymnasium; Muncie, Indiana |
| May 1972 | (8–15, 15–6, 5–15) | | | Irving Gymnasium; Muncie, Indiana |

| May 1972 | UCLA | 2–0 | UC Santa Barbara | Irving Gymnasium; Muncie, Indiana |
| May 1972 | (15–13, 15–7) | | | Irving Gymnasium; Muncie, Indiana |

| May 1972 | San Diego State | 2–0 | UCLA | Irving Gymnasium; Muncie, Indiana |
| May 1972 | (15–7, 15–11) | | | Irving Gymnasium; Muncie, Indiana |

| May 1972 | Ball State | 0–2 | UC Santa Barbara | Irving Gymnasium; Muncie, Indiana |
| May 1972 | (9–15, 13–15) | | | Irving Gymnasium; Muncie, Indiana |

| May 1972 | San Diego State | 0–2 | UC Santa Barbara | Irving Gymnasium; Muncie, Indiana |
| May 1972 | (13–15, 10–15) | | | Irving Gymnasium; Muncie, Indiana |

| May 1972 | Ball State | 0–2 | UCLA | Irving Gymnasium; Muncie, Indiana |
| May 1972 | (1–15, 4–15) | | | Irving Gymnasium; Muncie, Indiana |

== Bracket ==
- Site: Irving Gymnasium, Muncie, Indiana

Semifinals
1 | UCLA (3) | 15 | 15 | 12 | 15
4 | Ball State (1) | 9 | 9 | 15 | 2
2 | UC Santa Barbara (2) | 15 | 15 | 9 | 11 | 12
3 | San Diego State (3) | 11 | 13 | 15 | 15 | 15

Championship
1 | UCLA (3) | 10 | 9 | 15 | 15 | 15
3 | San Diego State (2) | 15 | 15 | 9 | 10 | 7
Third place
2 | UC Santa Barbara (0) | 10 | 4
4 | Ball State (2) | 15 | 15

== All tournament team ==
- Dick Irvin, UCLA (Most Outstanding Player)
- John Zajec, UCLA
- Rick Niemi, Ball State
- Randy Stevenson, San Diego State
- Wayne Gracey, San Diego State
- David DeGroot, UC Santa Barbara
