= UC Irvine Anteaters men's volleyball =

American college volleyball team

- University: University of California, Irvine
- Head coach: David Kniffin (14th season)
- Conference: Big West
- Location: Irvine, California, US
- Home arena: Bren Events Center (capacity: 5,000)
- Nickname: Anteaters
- Colors: Blue and gold

NCAA tournament champion
- 2007, 2009, 2012, 2013

NCAA tournament runner-up
- 2026

NCAA tournament semifinal
- 2006, 2007, 2009, 2012, 2013, 2015, 2024, 2026

NCAA tournament appearance
- 2006, 2007, 2009, 2012, 2013, 2015, 2018, 2024, 2026

Conference tournament champion
- 2007, 2012, 2015

Conference regular season champion
- 2006, 2009, 2015

The UC Irvine Anteaters men's volleyball team is the men's intercollegiate volleyball team at the University of California, Irvine. The school began play in the 1988 season, and joined the WIVA in the 1989 season. UC Irvine then became a founding member of the Mountain Pacific Sports Federation in the 1992–93 season. Beginning with the 2017–18 season, UCI moved to the Big West Conference's inaugural men's volleyball league. Irvine has won the NCAA Men's National Collegiate Volleyball Championship four times (2007, 2009, 2012, 2013) and appeared in the tournament an additional four.

== Yearly record ==
Year	Head Coach	Overall record	Conference record	Conference standing	Postseason
(Independent) (1988–1988)
(WIVA Conference) (1989–1992)
(MPSF) (1993–2017)
2007	John Speraw	29–5	0–0	–	NCAA Champions
2008	John Speraw	17–12	0–0	–	
2009	John Speraw	26–4	0–0	–	NCAA Champions
2010	John Speraw	15–14	0–0	–	
2011	John Speraw	19–12	2–0	T–1st	
2012	John Speraw	26–5	17–5	1st	NCAA Champions
2013	David Kniffin	25–7	18–6	T–2nd	NCAA Champions
2014	David Kniffin	18–11	15–9	T–4th	
2015	David Kniffin	28–5	19–3	1st	NCAA Semifinals
2016	David Kniffin	10–20	7–15	T–8th	
2017	David Kniffin	20–7	13–5	4th	
(Big West Conference) (2018–present)
2018	David Kniffin	21–10	6–4	T–2nd	NCAA Quarterfinals
2019	David Kniffin	18–11	5–5	3rd	
2020	David Kniffin	10–6	0–2	–	COVID
2021	David Kniffin	2–14	2–8	6th	
2022	David Kniffin	11–16	3–7	5th	
2023	David Kniffin	18–11	6–4	3rd	
2024	David Kniffin	20–11	7–3	2nd	NCAA Semifinals
2025	David Kniffin	21–7	6–4	3rd	
2026	David Kniffin	21–9	5–5	T–3rd	NCAA Runner-up
2027	David Kniffin	0–0	0–0		
Total:		374–185 (.669)	131–85 (.606)		
National champion Postseason invitational champion Conference regular season champion Conference regular season and conference tournament champion Division regular season champion Division regular season and conference tournament champion Conference tournament champion

== Notable alumni ==
The following alumni are distinguished for their contribution to the school's men's volleyball program and for having a successful playing career individually.

- Kévin Tillie, 2011–13
- Carson Clark, 2009–12
- Ryan Ammerman, 2006–09
- Jayson Jablonsky, 2004–07
- David Smith, 2004–07
- Brian Thornton, 2004–07
