= John Speraw =

American volleyball coach

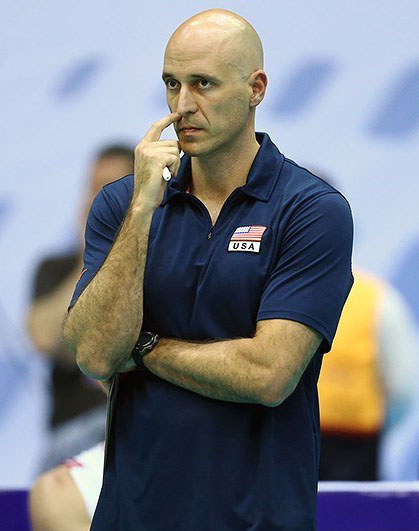
- Speraw in 2015

Personal information
- Born: October 18, 1971 (age 55); Arcadia, California, U.S.
- Hometown: California
- Education: UCLA

Coaching information
- Current team: USA Volleyball
Previous teams coached
Teams
USA Men's Volleyball; UCLA Men's Volleyball; USA Men's Volleyball (Asst.); UCLA Men's Volleyball (Asst.); UC Irvine Men's Volleyball (Head Coach)

Best results
Years	Location	Result
2007, 2009, 2012, 2023, 2024	NCAA National Championship (head coach)	1st
- Last updated: May 4, 2024

John Speraw (born October 18, 1971) is an American volleyball coach and former player. He currently serves as the president and CEO of USA Volleyball. Prior to this, he served as head coach of the United States men's national volleyball team, the UCLA Bruins men's volleyball team, and the UC Irvine Anteaters men's volleyball team.

== College career ==
Speraw played as middle blocker on the UCLA Bruins men's volleyball team. With the team, he won two NCAA National Championships in 1993 and 1995. He graduated from UCLA in 1995 with a degree in Microbiology and Molecular Genetics, after which he spent three seasons as a volunteer assistant coach before being appointed to a full-time position in 1998.

== Coaching career ==
From 2002 to 2012, Speraw was the head coach of the UC Irvine Anteaters men's volleyball team. Under his leadership, the Anteaters won the NCAA National Championships in 2007, 2009, and 2012. In 2012, Speraw returned to UCLA as the men's volleyball head coach. In 2023, Speraw coached the team to its first national championship since 2006. The team defended its title in 2024, earning its 21st overall championship.

At the 2008 Summer Olympics in Beijing, Speraw served as assistant coach to the United States men's national volleyball team under Hugh McCutcheon, helping the team win a gold medal. He continued as assistant coach under Alan Knipe during the 2012 Summer Olympics in London, where the USA came in fifth place.

In 2013, Speraw became the head coach for the United States men's volleyball team. Under his coaching, the team won a bronze medal at the 2016 Summer Olympics. At the 2020 Summer Olympics in Tokyo, the team failed to make it out of pool play for the first time in over 20 years. At the 2023 FIVB Volleyball Men's Nations League, Speraw coached the team to a silver medal after losing to Poland in the finals.

== President of USA Volleyball ==
On September 26, 2024, Speraw was named President and CEO of USA Volleyball. At this time, he also resigned from his positions as the head coach of the United States men's national volleyball team and head coach of the UCLA Bruins men's volleyball team.

== Honors and awards ==
- Only individual in men's volleyball history to win an NCAA Championship as a head coach, assistant coach and player
- NCAA Champion, UC Irvine Head Coach 2007, 2009, and 2012
- NCAA Champion, UCLA Head Coach 2023, 2024
- NCAA Champion, UCLA Assistant Coach 1996, 1998, and 2000
- NCAA Champion, UCLA Player 1993 and 1995
- MPSF Coach of the Year, 2006
- U.S. National Indoor Team Head Coach, Bronze Medal, 2016 Rio de Janeiro Olympics
- U.S. National Indoor Team Assistant Coach, Gold Medal, 2008 Beijing Olympics
- U.S. National Indoor Team Assistant Coach, 2012 London Olympics
