= 2024 NCAA men's volleyball tournament =

Men's college volleyball tournament

Tournament details
- Dates: April 30 – May 4
- Teams: 8

Final positions
- Champions: UCLA (21st title)
- Runners-up: Long Beach State

Tournament statistics
- Matches played: 7
- Attendance: 24,350 (3,479 per match)

Awards
- Most Outstanding Player: Ethan Champlin ^{(UCLA)}

The 2024 NCAA men's volleyball tournament was the 53rd edition of the NCAA men's volleyball tournament, an annual tournament to determine the national champion of NCAA Division I and NCAA Division II men's collegiate indoor volleyball. The single-elimination tournament, which was expanded to eight teams with the addition of an automatic bid for the Southern Intercollegiate Athletic Conference (SIAC) champion, began with four quarterfinal matches. The entire tournament was hosted by California State University, Long Beach from April 30 to May 4, 2024, at the Walter Pyramid in Long Beach.

The quarterfinals and semifinals were streamed live on NCAA.com. The National Championship was moved from ESPN2 to ESPN and took place on May 4 with ESPN+ simulcasting it.

In an unprecedented decision, the SIAC was granted a waiver to be allowed an automatic bid despite not meeting the two-year eligibility waiting period requirement. The SIAC was granted the bid because the conference, consisting primarily of historically black colleges and universities, had been fostering growth and diversity in a community and region that has had little representation in men's volleyball.

With Fort Valley State University receiving the automatic bid for the SIAC conference, the school made history as the first HBCU to compete in the NCAA Men's National Collegiate Volleyball Championship.

Of note, the quarterfinals featured a sweep in every game, the first such occurrence since the 2013 NCAA Men's Volleyball Tournament, albeit an important difference being that the field was much smaller back then (4 compared to 8).

With UCLA winning its 21st title, it's the first time the school has repeated as champions since the 1995-1996 seasons. Likewise, their win marks the sixth school in a row to repeat as champions, starting with UC Irvine's repeat wins in the 2012-2013 seasons. Ironically, John Speraw, who just won back-to-back titles with UCLA also won with UC Irvine in 2012 season, before leaving to coach at UCLA in 2013.

== Bids ==
The tournament field was announced on NCAA.com Sunday, April 21, 2024, at 1 p.m. EDT.

School	Conference	Record	Berth	Source
Long Beach State	Big West	25–2	Tournament champion	
Belmont Abbey	Conference Carolinas	21–4	Tournament champion	
Penn State	EIVA	23–6	Tournament champion	
Ohio State	MIVA	22–8	Tournament champion	
Grand Canyon	MPSF	25–4	Tournament champion	
Fort Valley State	SIAC	17–8	Tournament champion	
UC Irvine	Big West	19–10	At-large	
UCLA	MPSF	23–5	At-large	

== Bracket ==
Quarterfinals; Tuesday, April 30; NCAA.com
1	UCLA	3
8	Fort Valley State	0
4	UC Irvine	3
5	Penn State	0
6	Ohio State	0
3	Grand Canyon	3
7	Belmont Abbey	0
2	Long Beach State	3

Semifinals; Thursday, May 2 NCAA.com
1	UCLA	3
4	UC Irvine	2
3	Grand Canyon	2
2	Long Beach State	3

National Championship; Saturday, May 4 ESPN, ESPN+ (SAP)
1	UCLA	3
2	Long Beach State	1

== Schedule and results ==
All times Pacific.

Match	Time	Matchup	Score	Attendance	Broadcasters	Referees
Quarterfinals – Tuesday, April 30
1	11:00 a.m.	UCLA vs. Fort Valley State	3–0 (25–14, 25–15, 25–15)	3,024	Daniel Gillman & Rob St. Claire	Sergio Gonzales, Ron Pelham, Rachel Jensen, Jason Schmidt
2	1:30 p.m.	UC Irvine vs.Penn State	3–0 (26–24, 25–16, 25–19)	3,024	Daniel Gillman & Rob St. Claire	Ron Pelham, Stephen Shepherd, Shane White, John Park
3	5:00 p.m.	Long Beach State vs. Belmont Abbey	3–0 (25–18, 25–14, 25–11)	3,463	Daniel Gillman & Rob St. Claire	Krystian Krzyzak, Sergio Gonzales, John Park, Shane White
4	7:30 p.m.	Grand Canyon vs. Ohio State	3–0 (25–23, 25–20, 25–21)	3,463	Daniel Gillman & Rob St. Claire	Stephen Shepherd, Sergio Gonzales, Rachel Jensen, Jason Schmidt
Semifinals – Thursday, May 2
5	3:30 p.m.	UCLA vs. UC Irvine	3–2 (22–25, 25–20, 25–16, 18–25, 15–12)	3,786	Daniel Gillman & Rob St. Claire	Ron Pelham, Krystian Krzyzak, Rachel Jensen, Shane White, Jason Schmidt, John Park
6	6:00 p.m.	Long Beach State vs. Grand Canyon	3–2 (24–26, 26–28, 25–18, 25–23, 15–10)	3,786	Daniel Gillman & Rob St. Claire	Krystian Krzyzak, Stephen Shepherd, Rachel Jensen, Shane White, Jason Schmidt, John Park
National Championship – Saturday, May 4
7	2:00 p.m.	UCLA vs. Long Beach State	3–1 (25–21, 25–20, 27–29, 25–21)	3,804	Paul Sunderland & Kevin Barnett (ESPN2); Rigoberto Plascencia & Alex Pombo (ESPN+ SAP)	Ron Pelham, Krystian Krzyzak, Rachel Jensen, Shane White, Jason Schmidt, John Park

== All Tournament Team ==
- Hilir Henno, UC Irvine
- Camden Gianni, Grand Canyon University
- Skyler Varga, Long Beach State
- Simon Torwie, Long Beach State
- Andrew Rowan, UCLA
- Merrick McHenry, UCLA
- Ethan Champlin, UCLA (Most Outstanding Player)
