= Ernie Suwara =

American volleyball player (born 1945)

Ernie Suwara (born 15 March 1945) is an American former volleyball player who competed in the 1964 Summer Olympics.
