= Al Scates =

American volleyball player and coach (born 1939)

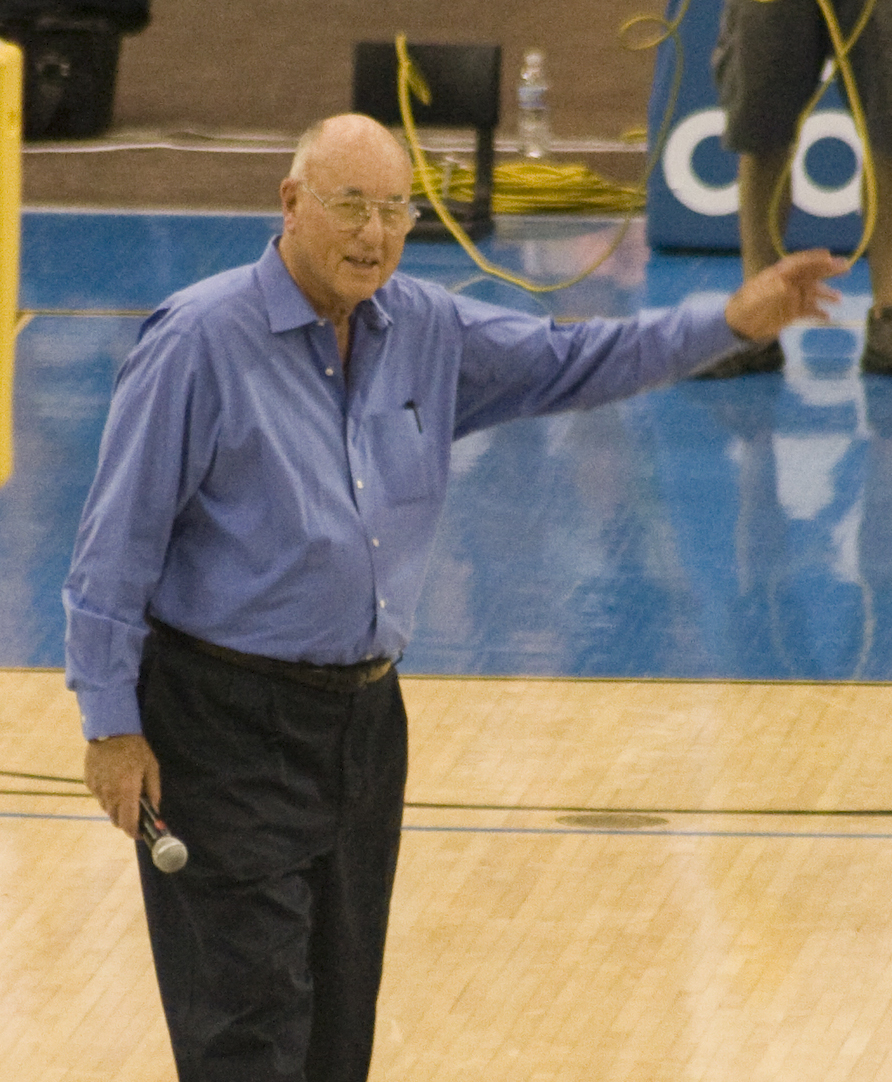
- Scates in 2009

Personal information
- Born: June 13, 1939 (age 87) Los Angeles, California, U.S.
- Education: UCLA
- Occupation: Volleyball coach
- Spouse: Sue Scates
Medal record
Men's volleyball
Representing the United States
Pan American Games
Gold medal – first place	1967 Winnipeg	Team

Allen Edward Scates (born June 13, 1939) is an American former volleyball player and coach who was head coach of the UCLA Bruins for 48 years. Scates is the winningest volleyball coach in the history of the NCAA, and the 19 NCAA titles the Bruins won during his tenure ties him for the most NCAA titles won by a coach in a single sport with Arkansas' John McDonnell (Indoor Track and Field). Scates' teams won collegiate volleyball championships in five different decades. In addition to coaching, Scates was a physical education instructor at Horace Mann and Hawthorne, two of the elementary schools in the Beverly Hills Unified School District.

== Early life and athletic career ==
Scates grew up in Santa Monica in Los Angeles and attended Westchester High School. At 6 ft 2, he was tall and athletic, and played both basketball and football in high school. When he graduated he went to Santa Monica College, majoring in physical education with the goal of coaching football at the high school level. He played football at Santa Monica College, and was an undersized center on the school's basketball team.

Scates' interest in volleyball began when his college football coach required his players to try out for a volleyball team to stay in shape during the off season. Scates did not make the team roster, but a teammate of his on the basketball team not only made the team, but was the best player on the floor. “So I asked him where he learned to play,” Scates said. “He told me State Beach in Santa Monica. So I decided to learn how to play.” Scates was soon a regular at State Beach.

In 1959 Scates transferred to UCLA. Though a junior with only a couple years of experience, he made the school's volleyball team as a walk on. A left handed outside hitter, he made a particularly effective right front. The team played several of the college club teams, but the major event of the year was the USVBA Open National tournament. Scates was selected as an All American, and was team captain for the Bruins in 1960 and 1961. From the USVBA Nationals he was selected as a member of the U.S. National team. Meanwhile, on the beach he earned a AAA rating, often teaming with Bob Mendoza, a San Diego Hall of Champions inductee.

== Early coaching ==
At the age of 24 Scates moved from player to coach. When the UCLA volleyball coach took a sabbatical, he offered Scates the job. Scates was surprised but accepted. He then went to meet with Athletic Director Wilbur Johns. "He didn't even tell me to sit down," Scates recalled. "I told him that I cannot accept a salary for coaching volleyball because I wanted to be in the Olympics in 1964, and at that time if you coached a sport for money or played for money you were not considered an amateur and couldn't participate in the Olympics. "When he heard that he jumped up, shook my hand, and said, 'Congratulations, son, you're hired.'"

The program was run on a shoestring budget. In Scates’ first year the volleyball team was allotted $100. The team uniforms were the discarded old uniforms from the basketball team. Shoes, socks, and even the entry fees to tournaments were all paid for by Scates and the players. In his first year in 1963 the team finished with a 26-3 record, and placed second at the USVBA national championship. Scates still competed for the U.S. national team as an outside hitter but missed the cut for the 1964 Summer Olympics in Tokyo. Scates' Bruins won a USVBA national title in 1965, and again in 1967.

In 1970 the NCAA elevated men's volleyball to a championship sport. In the first sanctioned championship Scates and the Bruins swept Long Beach State University to win the first NCAA title in volleyball. They would win the next two years as well, and win six of the first seven NCAA Championships held. From 1981 to 1984, Scates' teams won four consecutive national championships, the longest such streak by any men's volleyball team. UCLA is the only team that has won more than two consecutive championships, holding streaks of at least 3 national championships 3 times.

== Coaching style ==
Scates was highly competitive both as a player and a coach, and he designed his practices to underscore competition and intensity. Practices moved at a high pace, with high repetitions and little time between drills. "I ran shorter drills and quicker, and I didn’t stop the drills to explain things very much. I just tried to coach and keep things going at the same time." John Wooden was a major influence on Scates and eventually a lifelong friend. "I used to sit up there and watch him when we weren’t practicing. I learned a lot from that. I liked how he changed drills very quickly. He didn’t have any down time. And then I read a book he wrote in 1965 called 'Practical Modern Basketball.'"

The Bruins volleyball team had an "A" squad and a developmental squad. A large blue curtain separated the two practice courts. Players were in constant competition to stay on the "A" squad. Scates used a scoring system for his players during the practices, and their position on the team depended on the points they were scoring in practice. The coaches with the development squad could recommend players to move up, and Scates would check scores and move an "A" court player down. The scoring system allowed the players to know there was nothing personal in the choices being made. John Speraw, a former player and current head coach at UCLA, commented "the way he managed to make objective decisions was to stay fairly separate from the players. It was never personal. And once you graduated, he enjoyed the relationship that developed with his players." He highly valued competitiveness in a player, and wanted to go into matches with players that hated to lose. UCLA alumnus Karch Kiraly noted a common thread in the players around him at UCLA: "He recruited people that were like I was. We absolutely hated to lose and loved to win, and that's what the Bruins were like. They were a reflection of Al, and Al wanted to win every single match, every single season."

Like Wooden, Scates established himself as an innovator, changing a deliberate game to the fast-paced sport it is today. "Until the late ’60s, the game was a very slow game,” Scates said. "You didn’t try to deceive anybody. You just tried to set a high ball to the outside and if your hitter was better than the blockers you scored a point. By the late 1960s we started setting very quick here at UCLA. We started running an offense that is still being run today.” Said USC coach Bill Ferguson “He is responsible for so much of our sport’s development that we will never be able to fathom what he did to promote our game. He is the best in-game tactician there ever was.”

== Accomplishments ==
Scates left the UCLA Bruins with a career record of 1,239–290, more matches than any collegiate coach. The only coach who approaches it in volleyball is Penn State women's volleyball coach Russ Rose. In 37 years, Rose has won seven NCAA titles and compiled a record of 1246–198. Scates holds the best winning percentage of all coaches in all sports. No other program at UCLA in the last 50 years has won as many national titles as Scates' volleyball teams. Sometimes referred to as "the other Wizard of Westwood," he won more NCAA titles than John Wooden. Twice his teams won national titles three years in a row.

Scates has played a role in the development of many volleyball players. Through his program Scates has coached 78 All Americans, 44 U.S. national team members, 27 Olympians, 7 players that were chosen as NCAA Player of the Year, and launched dozens of coaching careers. Coaching positions held by former Scates' players include the former and current Bruins women's team coaches, Andy Banachowski and Mike Sealy. Prominent beach volleyball players that played indoor for Scates include Jim Menges, Sinjin Smith, Randy Stoklos, Ricci Luyties and Karch Kiraly.

In 2006, the Bruins and Scates won their last national championship with a win over Penn State University at Penn State's Rec Hall. It was Scates' 19th national championship. Scates lists the 2006 UCLA Bruins as one of his favorites, who began the season 12–12, but closed with a 14-game winning streak. The 12 losses were the most ever for an NCAA Championship team, and the second most for the Bruins in a single season under Scates.

Scates was selected NCAA coach of the year 1984, 1987 and 1993. His teams hold ten NCAA records, including most consecutive victories (48), most consecutive home wins (83) and most consecutive tournament wins (14). He was inducted into the International Volleyball Hall of Fame in 1993.

== Retirement ==
After coaching the Bruins for 50 seasons, Scates retired at the end of the 2012 season. He is the most successful coach in the history of the sport. He has been inducted into the Hall of Fame of a number of volleyball organizations, including The American Volleyball Coaches Association, The UCLA Athletics, The California Beach Volleyball and the Volleyball Halls of Fame. He was the first active coach inducted into the UCLA and Volleyball Halls of Fame. In retirement, he offered "It is a privilege to coach the fine men that have participated and continue to compete for UCLA volleyball. I have enjoyed being a continuous member of UCLA volleyball since I walked onto the team as a junior in 1959." Said Penn State's Russ Rose “I look at the 19 national championships and shake my head. I can understand 50 years at UCLA because they don’t have winter. But the number of great players who have played at UCLA and the bond they all have for each other and the university is the greatest contribution he has made to the sport. That’s his lasting legacy.”

== Personal life ==
Scates is married. He and his wife have three children. His son, David, is a Physical Education and Health and Guidance teacher at Herbert Hoover High School in Glendale, CA. He also has two daughters, Leslie and Tracy, and four grandchildren, three from Leslie and one from David. Scates is on the Board of Directors of the American Volleyball Coaches Association (AVCA). He was featured in the January 2007 issue of Coaching Volleyball Magazine, the official magazine of the AVCA.

Scates was part of the Alpha Psi chapter of Phi Kappa Sigma International Fraternity while he matriculated at UCLA.

== Awards and recognition ==
- In 2003, Scates was enshrined in the UCLA Hall of Fame.
- In 2004, Scates was enshrined in the American Volleyball Coaches Association (AVCA) Hall of Fame.
- Scates has been named Coach of the Year five times: 1984, 1987, 1993, 1996, 1998.

== Championships ==
UCLA has won the following Volleyball Championships under Scates.

- USVBA (2): 1965, 1967
- NCAA (19): 1970, 1971, 1972, 1974, 1975, 1976, 1979, 1981, 1982, 1983, 1984, 1987, 1989 1993, 1995, 1996, 1998, 2000, 2006

== Head coaching record ==
Record table
Season	Team	Overall	Conference	Standing	Postseason
UCLA (Mountain Pacific Sports Federation) (1963–2010)
1963	UCLA	26–3		2	USVBA 2nd Place
1964	UCLA	23–4		1	USVBA 2nd Place
1965	UCLA	24–2		1	USVBA Champions
1966	UCLA	25–3		1	USVBA 2nd Place
1967	UCLA	23–3		1	USVBA Champions
1968	UCLA	24–5		2	USVBA 4th Place
1969	UCLA	27–3		2	USVBA 2nd Place
1970	UCLA	24–1		2	NCAA Champions
1971	UCLA	29–1		2	NCAA Champions
1972	UCLA	27–7		2	NCAA Champions
1973	UCLA	21–8		4	Regional Runner-Up
1974	UCLA	30–5		3	NCAA Champions
1975	UCLA	27–8		4	NCAA Champions
1976	UCLA	15–2		1	NCAA Champions
1977	UCLA	19–4		2	Regional Runner-Up
1978	UCLA	21–3		1	NCAA Runner-Up
1979	UCLA	30–0		1	NCAA Champions
1980	UCLA	32–2		1	NCAA Runner-Up
1981	UCLA	32–3		2	NCAA Champions
1982	UCLA	29–0		1	NCAA Champions
1983	UCLA	27–4		1	NCAA Champions
1984	UCLA	38–0		1	NCAA Champions
1985	UCLA	32–8		3	Regional Runner-Up
1986	UCLA	30–9		2	Regional Runner-Up
1987	UCLA	38–3		1	NCAA Champions
1988	UCLA	28–10		4	First round
1989	UCLA	29–5		T-1	NCAA Champions
1990	UCLA	23–5		2	Regional Runner-Up
1991	UCLA	16–9		1	Regional Runner-Up
1992	UCLA	17–7		2	Regional Runner-Up
1993	UCLA	24–3		1	NCAA Champions
1994	UCLA	27–2		1	NCAA Runner-Up
1995	UCLA	31–1		1	NCAA Champions
1996	UCLA	26–5		1	NCAA Champions
1997	UCLA	24–5		1	NCAA Runner-Up
1998	UCLA	28–4		1	NCAA Champions
1999	UCLA	20–7		3	First round
2000	UCLA	29–5		1	NCAA Champions
2001	UCLA	24–8		1	NCAA Runner-Up
2002	UCLA	25–7		T-5	First round
2003	UCLA	15–14		9	
2004	UCLA	24–6		3	Regional semifinals
2005	UCLA	26–6		2	NCAA Runner-Up
2006	UCLA	26–12		7	NCAA Champions
2007	UCLA	19–11		5	First round
2008	UCLA	17–14		5	First round
2009	UCLA	14–16		8	First round
2010	UCLA	16–14		7	First round
2011	UCLA	16–15		8	First round
2012	UCLA	22–8		5	First round
UCLA:		1239–290			
Total:		1239–290			
National champion Postseason invitational champion Conference regular season champion Conference regular season and conference tournament champion Division regular season champion Division regular season and conference tournament champion Conference tournament champion
