= Ball State Cardinals men's volleyball =

Varsity volleyball team

- Founded: 1964
- University: Ball State University
- Athletic director: Jeff Mitchell
- Head coach: Mike Iandolo
- Conference: MIVA
- Location: Muncie, Indiana, US
- Home arena: Worthen Arena (capacity: 11,500)
- Nickname: Cardinals
- Colors: Cardinal and White

AIAW/NCAA tournament semifinal
- 1970, 1971, 1972, 1973, 1974, 1979, 1980, 1984, 1985, 1988, 1989, 1990, 1994, 1995, 1997, 2002, 2022, 2026

AIAW/NCAA tournament appearance
- 1970, 1971, 1972, 1973, 1974, 1979, 1980, 1984, 1985, 1988, 1989, 1990, 1994, 1995, 1997, 2002, 2022, 2026

Conference tournament champion
- 1964, 1965, 1966, 1967, 1968, 1984, 1985, 1988, 1989, 1990, 1994, 1995, 1997, 2002, 2022, 2026

Conference regular season champion
- 1964, 1965, 1966, 1967, 1968, 1970, 1971, 1974, 1975, 1976, 1979, 1984, 1985, 1988, 1989, 1990, 1995, 1996, 1997, 2002, 2022, 2023, 2024, 2026

The Ball State Cardinals men's volleyball team is one of 18 varsity teams at Ball State University in Muncie, Indiana.

The Cardinals are a charter member of the Midwestern Intercollegiate Volleyball Association (MIVA), which they have been competing in since the varsity program's inception in 1964.

== Arena ==
The Cardinals play their home matches at Worthen Arena on campus. They began playing at the arena in 1992, after having spent more than 28 seasons at Irving Gymnasium. At the conclusion of the 2023 season, the Cardinals held a 284-93 (.753) in Worthen Arena.

Worthen Arena also played host to the 1992 NCAA men's volleyball tournament.

== Coaching history ==
Since the team's founding in 1964, the men's volleyball program has had four head coaches. Dr. Don Shondell founded the men's volleyball program and served as its first head coach. Dr. Shondell was also one of the founders of the Midwestern Intercollegiate Volleyball Association. The Cardinals have competed in the conference since its founding.

Dr. Shondell was the head coach of the men's volleyball program for 34 years and amassed a record of 769-280-6 (.732). Dr. Shondell is the second-winningest coach in NCAA Division I men's volleyball history, behind former UCLA head coach Al Scates. In 1996, Dr. Shondell was inducted into the International Volleyball Hall of Fame.

In 1998, Dr. Shondell retired as head coach and was replaced by then-assistant coach, Joel Walton. Over 23 seasons as head coach, Walton amassed a record of 413-258 (.636), ranking him the twelfth winningest coach in NCAA Division I men's volleyball history. Walton remained the head coach of the men's volleyball program for 23 seasons until his retirement in 2021.

In June 2021, Donan Cruz was named the third head coach in program history. In Cruz's first year as head coach, he led the Cardinals to their first MIVA regular season championship, conference tournament championship, and NCAA Tournament berth since 2002. In his second season, the Cardinals were again the regular season champions but fell to Ohio State in the MIVA tournament championship match. Cruz resigned as head coach in June 2025.

On December 17, 2025, Mike Iandolo was named the fourth head coach in program history.

== Yearly records (1966-Present) ==
Season	Coach	Overall	Conference	Standing	Postseason
Don Shondell (Midwestern Intercollegiate Volleyball Association) (1966–1998)
1966-1998	Don Shondell	769–280			
Don Shondell:		769–280 (.733)	0–0 (–)		
Joel Walton (Midwestern Intercollegiate Volleyball Association) (1999–2021)
1999	Joel Walton	13–14	8–6	5th	
2000	Joel Walton	16–15	6–8	6th	
2001	Joel Walton	19–9	12–4	2nd	
2002	Joel Walton	23–8	14–2	1st–T	NCAA Tournament Semifinals
2003	Joel Walton	19–9	11–5	3rd	
2004	Joel Walton	22–9	12–4	3rd	
2005	Joel Walton	17–15	10–6	4th	
2006	Joel Walton	21–7	8–4	3rd	
2007	Joel Walton	18–12	8–4	4th	
2008	Joel Walton	21–10	10–2	2nd	
2009	Joel Walton	18–10	6–4	3rd	
2010	Joel Walton	19–11	7–5	4th	
2011	Joel Walton	19–11	7–5	4th	
2012	Joel Walton	14–12	5–7	4th	
2013	Joel Walton	21–6	9–5	3rd	
2014	Joel Walton	22–8	10–4	3rd	
2015	Joel Walton	13–6	6–10	6th	
2016	Joel Walton	20–9	12–4	3rd	
2017	Joel Walton	19–10	9–7	5th	
2018	Joel Walton	18–12	10–4	3rd	
2019	Joel Walton	15–15	6-8	5th	
2020	Joel Walton	12–8	4–3	3rd	
2021	Joel Walton	12–8	8–5	4th	
Joel Walton:		415–238 (.636)	193–106 (.645)		
Donan Cruz (Midwestern Intercollegiate Volleyball Association) (2022–2025)
2022	Donan Cruz	23–4	12–2	1st	NCAA Tournament Semifinals
2023	Donan Cruz	20–9	11–3	1st	
2024	Donan Cruz	21–10	13–3	1st	
2025	Donan Cruz	17–13	9–7	5th	
Donan Cruz:		81–36 (.692)	45–15 (.750)		
Mike Iandolo (Midwestern Intercollegiate Volleyball Association) (2026–present)
2026	Mike Iandolo	26–5	13–3	1st	NCAA Tournament Semifinals
Mike Iandolo:		26–5 (.839)	13–3 (.813)		
Total:		1291–559 (.698)	0–0 (–)		
National champion Postseason invitational champion Conference regular season champion Conference regular season and conference tournament champion Division regular season champion Division regular season and conference tournament champion Conference tournament champion
