= UCLA Bruins men's volleyball =

American college volleyball team

- University: UCLA
- Head coach: John Hawks (1st season)
- Conference: MPSF
- Location: Los Angeles, California, US
- Home arena: Pauley Pavilion, John Wooden Center (capacity: 12,829, 1,808)
- Nickname: Bruins
- Colors: Blue and gold

AIAW/NCAA tournament champion
- 1970, 1971, 1972, 1974, 1975, 1976, 1979, 1981, 1982, 1983, 1984, 1987, 1989, 1993, 1995, 1996, 1998, 2000, 2006, 2023, 2024

AIAW/NCAA tournament runner-up
- 1978, 1980, 1994, 1997, 2001, 2005, 2018, 2025

AIAW/NCAA tournament semifinal
- 2016, 2022

AIAW/NCAA Regional Final
- 2026

The UCLA Bruins men's volleyball program represents the University of California, Los Angeles (UCLA) in the sport of men's volleyball as a member of the Mountain Pacific Sports Federation (MPSF). UCLA played its first season in 1953 and has won a record 21 NCAA titles. Al Scates had been the head coach each year since 1963 until his retirement after the 2012 season. John Speraw took over as head coach after Scates’ retirement. After the 2024 season, Speraw left the program to become the president and CEO of USA Volleyball. John Hawks, who was previously an assistant coach for the Bruins from 2015-2022, would return as the team’s head coach. The Bruins play most of their home matches in Pauley Pavilion, but when Pauley is not available, they play in the Wooden Center.

Scates had more wins than any other NCAA Division I men's volleyball coach, with a record (since 1970, since no records were kept from 1953 to 1969) of 1,239–290.

== NCAA championships ==
The Bruins have won 21 NCAA championships, most recently on May 4, 2024. This marks the first time the Bruins have won back-to-back championships since the 1995-96 seasons.

== MPSF championships ==
- 2022 regular season champions
- 2023 regular season and tournament champions
- 2024 regular season and tournament champions
- 2025 regular season champions
- 2026 regular season and tournament champions

== Season-by-season results ==
| Year | Overall record | Conference record | Conference standing | Postseason |
|---|---|---|---|---|
| 2020 | 10–9 | 2–3 | 5th | – |
| 2021 | 15–6 | 15–6 | 2nd | – |
| 2022 | 22–5 | 11–1 | 1st | NCAA Semifinal |
| 2023 | 31–2 | 12–0 | 1st | NCAA Champions |
| 2024 | 26–5 | 11–1 | 1st | NCAA Champions |
| 2025 | 22–7 | 10–2 | 1st | NCAA Runners-up |
| 2026 | 29–2 | 13–1 | T-1st | NCAA Regional Final |
| Total | 133–29 | 64–12 | | |

Updated through the end of the 2026 season.

== Olympians ==
Former players who have gone to the Olympic Games to play or coach.

- Mike O’Hara, Ernie Suwara, Keith Erickson (1964)
- Larry Rundle (1968)
- **Karch Kiraly, Steve Salmons, Dave Saunders (1984)**
- **Karch Kiraly, Ricci Luyties, Doug Partie, Dave Saunders (1988)**
- Doug Partie*, Fred Sturm (coach), Greg Giova-nazzi (Asst. Coach) (1992)
- Carl Henkel, **Karch Kiraly**, Dan Landry, Bjorn Maaseide (Norway), Jeff Nygaard, Sinjin Smith, **Kent Steffes**, Fred Sturm (Coach), Rudy Suwara (Asst. Coach) (1996)
- Dan Landry, Jeff Nygaard, Erik Sullivan, Bjorn Maaseide (Norway), Mark Williams (Australia), Kevin Wong (2000)
- Bjorn Maaseide (Norway), Stein Metzger, Jeff Nygaard, Erik Sullivan, Mark Williams (Australia) (2004)
- **John Speraw (Assistant Coach-men) (2008)**
- John Speraw (Assistant Coach-men), Karch Kiraly** (Assistant Coach-women) (2012)
- John Speraw* (Head Coach-men), Erik Sullivan (Team Leader-men), Karch Kiraly* (Head Coach-women) (2016)
- John Speraw (Head Coach-men), Erik Sullivan (Team Leader-men), **Karch Kiraly (Head Coach-women)**, Mitch Stahl, Garrett Muagututia (2020)
- John Speraw* (Head Coach-men), Erik Sullivan (Team Leader-men), Karch Kiraly** (Head Coach-women), Micah Maʻa, Garrett Muagututia (2024)

Note: Team won gold medal in bold, team won silver medal (**), team won bronze medal (*)

== Postseason ==
=== MPSF Championship Tournament ===
| Year | Round | Opponent | Result |
|---|---|---|---|
| 2022 | Semifinals | Stanford | L 2–3 |
| 2023 | Semifinals; Championship | Grand Canyon; Stanford | W 3–0; W 3–0 |
| 2024 | Semifinals; Championship | USC; Grand Canyon | W 3–0; L 2-3 |
| 2025 | Semifinals | Pepperdine | L 2–3 |

=== NCAA National Championship ===
| Year | Round | Opponent | Result |
|---|---|---|---|
| – | – | – | – |
| 2022 | Opening Round; Semifinals | Pepperdine; Long Beach State | W 3–1; L 2–3 |
| 2023 | Semifinals; Championship | Long Beach State; Hawai'i | W 3–0; W 3–1 |
| 2024 | Quarterfinals; Semifinals; Championship | Fort Valley State; UC Irvine; Long Beach State | W 3–0; W 3-2; W 3–1 |
| 2025 | Quarterfinals; Semifinals; Championship | Belmont Abbey; Hawai'i; Long Beach State | W 3–0; W 3-0; L 0-3 |

== Awards and honors ==
- April 18, 2023 – Andrew Rowan named 2023 MPSF Freshman of the Year
- April 25, 2023 – Head coach John Speraw Named MPSF Men's Volleyball Coach of the Year
- May 6, 2023 – Ido David, Troy Gooch, and Alex Knight (MOP) were named to the NCAA Championship All-tournament team
- May 4, 2024 - Ethan Champlin (MOP), Andrew Rowan, and Merrick McHenry were all named to the NCAA Championship All-tournament team

== See also ==
- List of NCAA men's volleyball programs
