= Alan Knipe =

American volleyball coach (born 1969)

Biographical details
- Born: January 1, 1969 (age 57); Huntington Beach, California, U.S.

Playing career
- 1989: Orange Coast
- 1990–1992: Long Beach State
- Position: Middle blocker

Coaching career (HC unless noted)
- 1994–1995: Golden West
- 1996–2000: Long Beach State (assistant)
- 2001–2009: Long Beach State
- 2013–2025: Long Beach State

National team
- 2009–2012: United States

Head coaching record
- Overall: 474–185

Accomplishments and honors

Championships
- As coach: 3 NCAA (2018, 2019, 2025); 6 Big West regular season (2018–2019, 2022–2025); 2 Big West tournament (2018, 2024); 3 MPSF regular season (2001, 2008, 2017); MPSF tournament (2017); California State Community College (1995); As player: NCAA (1991)

Awards
- As coach: 3× AVCA Coach of the Year (2004, 2017–2018); 3× Big West Coach of the Year (2018–2019, 2024); 2× MPSF Coach of the Year (2008, 2017); As player: First-Team All-American (1992); Second-Team All-American (1991)
Medal record
Head coach for men's volleyball
Representing United States
FIVB World League
Silver medal – second place	2012 Sofia
Pan American Cup
Gold medal – first place	2008 Winnipeg
NORCECA Championship
Silver medal – second place	2011 Puerto Rico
Silver medal – second place	2009 Puerto Rico

Alan Knipe (born January 1, 1969) is the head coach of the Long Beach State men's volleyball team. As a player at CSULB, he helped the team reach back-to-back NCAA Men's Volleyball Championships in 1990 and 1991, winning the Championship in 1991. As a head coach, he has guided them to ten NCAA Semifinal appearances (2004, 2008, 2016, 2017, 2018, 2019, 2022, 2023, 2024, 2025) and three National Championships (2018, 2019, 2025). As a player, assistant coach and head coach, Knipe has helped the Long Beach State team to 12 of the program's 14 NCAA Semifinal appearances.

== Playing career ==
Knipe played on the Long Beach State men's volleyball team from 1990 to 1992. In 1991, he was named to the All-American second team and helped The Beach win the NCAA Championship. In 1992, he was named to the All-America first team.

Knipe then played for the U.S. national team in 1992 and 1993. Knipe played professionally in Italy and Belgium. He also played on the Bud Light 4-Man Pro Beach Volleyball Tour.

== Coaching career ==
=== College ===
Knipe was the men's head volleyball coach at Golden West College in 1994 and 1995. In 1995, along with Co-Head Coach and former CSULB teammate Patrick Sullivan, led the team to the California State JC championship. The championship was the first in school history for the men's team. His win-loss record at GWC was 28–14 (.667).

Knipe then became an assistant coach at Long Beach State in 1996. He was named the Head Coach in 2000. In 2004, he led the team to a 28–7 record and into the NCAA final. He was named the AVCA National Coach of the Year.

In 2008, he led the team to the NCAA Tournament semifinals and was named MPSF Coach of the Year and Volleyball Magazine Coach of the Year. Following the 2009 season, Knipe took three seasons off to coach the United States Men's National Volleyball team. Knipe lead Long Beach State to four straight NCAA Final Four appearances from 2016 to 2019. Winning the NCAA Championship in 2018 and 2019, the first back-to-back National Championships at Long Beach State. Knipe was named AVCA Coach of the year in 2017 and 2018. He was also named conference coach of the year in 2017, 2018, and 2019. He has helped develop 6 National Player of the Year, starting with Paul Lotman (2008), Taylor Crabb (2013), Josh Tuaniga (2017), TJ DeFalco (2017, 2019) and Aleksander Nikolov (2022).

=== International ===
Knipe became the Head Coach of the U.S. Men's National Team in 2009. Leading the team to the silver medal at the 2009 and 2011 at the NORCECA Championships as well as the 2012 FIVB World League. Knipe coached Team USA to the World League Finals in 2009, 2011, and 2012. At the 2012 Summer Olympics, the U.S. finished tied for fifth, winning their pool and finishing with a 4–2 record.

== Personal life ==
Knipe graduated from Marina High School in 1987 and from Long Beach State in 1992. He lives in Huntington Beach, California, with his wife and two sons, Evan and Aidan.

== Head coaching record ==
=== College ===
Record table
Season	Team	Overall	Conference	Standing	Postseason
Long Beach State 49ers (Mountain Pacific Sports Federation) (2001–2009)
2001	Long Beach State	18–7	12–5	1st	
2002	Long Beach State	13–18	9–13	7th	
2003	Long Beach State	17–13	11–11	8th	
2004	Long Beach State	28–7	18–4	2nd	NCAA Runner-up
2005	Long Beach State	22–10	14–8	5th	
2006	Long Beach State	22–10	14–8	4th	
2007	Long Beach State	11–17	6–16	10th	
2008	Long Beach State	23–7	18–4	1st	NCAA Semifinal
2009	Long Beach State	14–14	11–11	7th	
Long Beach State 49ers (Mountain Pacific Sports Federation) (2013–2017)
2013	Long Beach State	24–8	18–6	T–2nd	
2014	Long Beach State	18–10	15–9	T–4th	
2015	Long Beach State	15–13	11–11	7th	
2016	Long Beach State	25–8	17–5	T–2nd	NCAA Semifinal
2017	Long Beach State	24–7	16–2	1st	NCAA Semifinal
Long Beach State 49ers/Beach (Big West Conference) (2018–2025)
2018	Long Beach State	28–1	9–1	1st	NCAA Champion
2019	Long Beach State	28–2	10–0	1st	NCAA Champion
2020	Long Beach State	10–1	N/A (Note: Season not played past March 6 due to COVID-19 pandemic)	N/A	Abbreviated season due to COVID-19
2021	Long Beach State	7–5	6–4	3rd	
2022	Long Beach State	21–6	8–2	1st	NCAA Runner-up
2023	Long Beach State	21–5	9–1	T–1st	NCAA Semifinal
2024	Long Beach State	27–3	9–1	1st	NCAA Runner-up
2025	Long Beach State	30–3	8–2	1st	NCAA Champion
Long Beach State:		446–171 (.723)	249–124 (.668)		
Total:		446–171 (.723)			
National champion Postseason invitational champion Conference regular season champion Conference regular season and conference tournament champion Division regular season champion Division regular season and conference tournament champion Conference tournament champion

=== Junior college ===
Record table
Season	Team	Overall	Conference	Standing	Postseason
Golden West Rustlers (1994–1995)
1994	Golden West	10–9	9–8		
1995	Golden West	18–5	12–5		
Golden West:		28–14 (.667)	21–13 (.618)		
Total:		28–14 (.667)			
