= 2025 Long Beach State Beach men's volleyball team =

American college volleyball season

2025 Long Beach State Beach men's volleyball
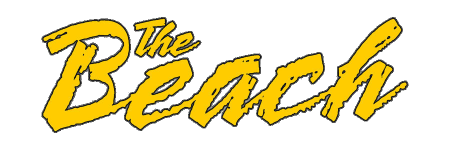

Big West Regular Season Champions

NCAA Tournament, Champions
- Conference: Big West Conference

Ranking
- Coaches: No. 1
- Record: 30-3 (8-2 Big West)
- Head coach: Alan Knipe (22nd season)
- Assistant coaches: Nick MacRae (13th season); McKay Smith (5th season); Andy Read (29th season)
- Home arena: Walter Pyramid

2025 Big West Conference men's volleyball standings
	Conf.				Overall
Team	W		L	PCT	W		L	PCT
No. 1 Long Beach State ‍†‍‍^{y}	8	–	2	.800	30	–	3	.909
No. 3 Hawaii ‍‍‡‍^{y}	7	–	3	.700	27	–	6	.818
No. 5 UC Irvine ‍‍‍	6	–	4	.600	21	–	7	.750
No. 10 UC San Diego ‍‍‍	3	–	7	.300	18	–	12	.600
No. 17 UC Santa Barbara ‍‍‍	3	–	7	.300	12	–	16	.429
No. 9 Cal State Northridge ‍‍‍	3	–	7	.300	18	–	11	.621
† – Conference champion ‡ – Big West tournament champion y – Invited to the NCAA tournament Rankings from AVCA

The 2025 Long Beach State Beach men's volleyball team represented Long Beach State University in the 2025 NCAA Division I & II men's volleyball season. The Beach, led by twenty-second year head coach Alan Knipe, played their home games at Walter Pyramid. The Beach competed as members of the Big West Conference. The Long Beach State Beach lost to Hawai'i in the Big West Conference tournament. The team then received an at-large bid to the NCAA tournament, and went on to win the national championship versus UCLA, winning in three straight sets. This is their fourth men's volleyball NCAA championship, and their first since their back-to-back wins in 2018 and 2019.

== Preseason ==
=== Coaches poll ===
The preseason poll was released on December 19, 2024. Long Beach State was picked to finish first in the Big West Conference standings.

=== Big West Coaches' Poll ===
Coaches' Poll
Pos.	Team	Points
1	Long Beach State	24 (4)
2	UC Irvine	21 (2)
3	Hawai'i	18
4	UC Santa Barbara	12
5	CSUN	8
6	UC San Diego	7

== Roster ==
2025 Long Beach State Beach roster
Defensive specialist/libero: 11 Kellen Larson - Freshman; 28 Chris Connelly - (redshirt) Sophomore; 40 Ford Harman - (redshirt) Freshman; Middle blockers: 3 Lazar Bouchkov - Sophomore; 5 Isaiah Preuitt - Freshman; 6 Ben Braun - Junior; 19 DiAeris McRaven - Senior; 24 Noah Robin - (redshirt) Senior	Outside hitters: 2 Sebastian Rodriguez - (redshirt) Senior; 8 Sotiris Siapanis - Senior; 9 Sebastiano Sani - Sophomore; 10 Connor Bloom - (redshirt) Junior; 12 Alex Kandev - Freshman; 17 Dane Hillis - (redshirt) Junior; 20 Georgi Binev - Sophomore; 34 Nate Baddeley - (redshirt) Freshman	Opposite hitters: 4 Skyler Varga - (redshirt) Junior; 9 Nathan Harlan - Junior; 10 Connor Bloom - (redshirt) Junior; 16 Nico Lietz - (redshirt) Sophomore; 18 Nato Dickinson - (redshirt) Senior; 20 Georgi Binev - Sophomore; 25 Ryan Peluso - (redshirt) Sophomore; 31 Daniil Hershtynovich - Sophomore; Setters: 1 Moni Nikolov - Freshman; 13 Island Doty - Junior; 25 Ryan Peluso - (redshirt) Sophomore; 40 Ford Harman - (redshirt) Freshman

== Schedule ==
Legend
	Beach win
	Beach loss
	Postponement
*	Non-Conference Game

2025 Long Beach State Beach Men's Volleyball Game Log (30–3)
Regular season (26–2)

January (7–0)
Date	TV	Opponent	Rank	Stadium	Score	Sets	Attendance	Overall	BWC
Exhibition - North American Challenge
January 3	-	Saskatchewan*	No. 2	Walter Pyramid; Long Beach, California	3-0	(25–23, 25–21, 25–19)	–	–	–
January 3	-	Trinity Western*	No. 2	Walter Pyramid	3-0	(25–15, 25–17, 25–15)	–	–	—
January 4	-	Calgary*	No. 2	Walter Pyramid	3-0	(25–15, 25–20, 25–19)	157	–	—
January 10	ESPN+	Saint Francis*	No. 2	Walter Pyramid	3-0	(25–13, 25–15, 25–12)	1,281	1-0	—
January 15	ESPN+	at Lindenwood	No. 2	Robert F. Hyland Performance Arena; St. Charles, Missouri	3-0	(25–14, 25–16, 25–19)	612	2-0	—
January 16	ESPN+	at McKendree*	No. 2	Melvin Price Convocation Center; Lebanon, Illinois	3-0	(25–19, 25–20, 25–23)	350	3-0	—
January 18	ESPN+	at No. 12 Lewis*	No. 2	Neil Carey Arena; Romeoville, Illinois	3-1	(20–25, 27–25, 25–16, 25–23)	1,400	4-0	—
January 24	ESPN+	Concordia Irvine*	No. 2	Walter Pyramid	3-0	(25–22, 25–19, 25–15)	1,625	5-0	—
January 26	ESPN+	at No. 11 Pepperdine*	No. 2	Firestone Fieldhouse; Malibu, California	3-2	(25–14, 24–26, 18–25, 25–17, 15–7)	630	6-0	—
Silver State Showdown
January 31	ESPN+	vs. Fort Valley State*	No. 1	Reno Convention Center; Reno, Nevada	3-0	(25–19, 25–17, 25–20)	100	7-0	—

February (7–0)
Date	TV	Opponent	Rank	Stadium	Score	Sets	Attendance	Overall	BWC
February 1	ESPN+	vs. Belmont Abbey*	No. 1	Reno Convention Center; Reno, Nevada	3-0	(25–17, 25–14, 25–20)	150	8-0	—
February 7	ESPN+	#3 UCLA*	No. 1	Walter Pyramid	3-1	(25–21, 20–25, 25–16, 25–22)	4,420	9-0	—
February 12	B1G+	at No. 3 UCLA*	No. 1	Pauley Pavilion	3-0	(25–23, 25–19, 25–23)	4,248	10-0	—
February 14	ESPN+	Vanguard*	No. 1	Walter Pyramid	3-0	(25–15, 25–11, 25–22)	1,763	11-0	—
February 21	ESPN+	No. 8 Grand Canyon*	No. 1	Walter Pyramid	3-0	(25–18, 27–25, 25–18)	2,450	12-0	—
February 22	ESPN+	Barton*	No. 1	Walter Pyramid	3-0	(25–14, 25–14, 25–16)	1,508	13-0	—
February 23	ESPN+	Barton*	No. 1	Walter Pyramid	3-0	(25–14, 25–13, 25–20)	1,338	14-0	—

March (7–1)
Date	TV	Opponent	Rank	Stadium	Score	Sets	Attendance	Overall	BWC
March 5	ESPN+	at No. 7 CSUN	No. 1	Premier America Credit Union Arena; Northridge, California	3-0	(25–22, 25–15, 25–20)	1,107	15-0	1–0
March 7	ESPN+	Sacred Heart*	No. 1	Walter Pyramid	3-0	(25–18, 25–16, 25–20)	1,927	16-0	—
March 14	ESPN+	No. 7 CSUN	No. 1	Walter Pyramid	3-0	(25–17, 25–14, 25–18)	3,165	17-0	2–0
March 15	ESPN+	No. 19т Princeton*	No. 1	Walter Pyramid	3-0	(25–19, 25–22, 25–19)	2,278	18-0	—
March 21	ESPN+	NJIT*	No. 1	Walter Pyramid	3-1	(25–9, 25–14, 23–25, 25-19	1,890	19-0	—
March 22	ESPN+	NJIT*	No. 1	Walter Pyramid	3-0	(25–18, 25–13, 25–20)	1,572	20-0	—
March 28	ESPN+	No. 5 UC Irvine	No. 1	Walter Pyramid	0-3	(25–27, 19–25, 19–25)	4,676	20-1	2–1
March 29	ESPN+	No. 5 UC Irvine	No. 1	Bren Events Center Irvine, California	3-0	(25–23, 25–19, 29–27)	4,758	21-1	3–1

April (5–1)
Date	TV	Opponent	Rank	Stadium	Score	Sets	Attendance	Overall	BWC
April 3	ESPN+	at No. 16 UC Santa Barbara	No. 1	The Thunderdome; Santa Barbara, California	3-1	(25–23, 25–16, 19–25, 25–19)	2,243	22-1	4–1
April 4	ESPN+	No. 16 UC Santa Barbara	No. 1	Walter Pyramid	3-0	(25–14, 25–20, 25–17)	2,921	23-1	5–1
April 11	ESPN+	at No. 4 Hawai'i	No. 1	Stan Sheriff Center; Honolulu, Hawai'i	3-1	(25–21, 25–18, 18–25, 25–21)	10,300	24-1	6–1
April 12	ESPN+	at No. 4 Hawai'i	No. 1	Stan Sheriff Center	2-3	(25–21, 20–25, 25–18, 19–25, 13–15)	10,300	24-2	6–2
April 18	ESPN+	at No. 10 UC San Diego	No. 1	LionTree Arena; La Jolla, California	3-0	(25–23, 25–10, 25–22)	4,000	25-2	7–2
April 19	ESPN+	No. 10 UC San Diego	No. 1	Walter Pyramid	3-0	(25–12, 25–21, 25–18)	4,364	26-2	8–2

Postseason (1–1)

Big West Tournament (1–1)
Date	TV	Opponent	Rank	Stadium	Score	Sets	Attendance	Record	BWC Tournament Record
April 24	ESPN+	vs. No. 10 UC San Diego (4); Semifinals	No. 1 (2)	Stan Sheriff Center; Honolulu, Hawai'i	3-0	(25–18, 25–23, 25–17)	7,209	27-2	1–0
April 25	ESPN+	vs. No. 3 Hawai'i (2); Finals	No. 1 (2)	Stan Sheriff Center	1-3	(21–25, 22–25, 25–21, 22–25)	8,576	27-3	1-1

NCAA Tournament (3–0)
Date	TV	Opponent	Rank	Stadium	Score	Sets	Attendance	Overall	Tournament Record
May 8	ESPN+	vs. Fort Valley State (8)	No. 1 (1)	Covelli Center; Columbus, Ohio	3-0	(25–21, 25–16, 25–16)	2,263	28-3	1–0
May 10	ESPN+	vs. No. 6 Pepperdine (5)	No. 1 (1)	Covelli Center	3-1	(20–25, 25–23, 25–19, 25–23)	3,342	29-3	2–0
May 12	ESPN+	vs. No. 3 UCLA (3)	No. 1 (1)	Covelli Center	3-0	(25–17, 25–23, 25–21)	3,063	30-3	3–0
*Non-conference game. ^{#}Rankings from AVCA Poll. (#) Tournament seedings in parentheses. All times are in Pacific.

== Rankings ==
Ranking movements Legend: ██ Increase in ranking ██ Decrease in ranking
	Week																	
Poll	Pre	1	2	3	4	5	6	7	8	9	10	11	12	13	14	15	16	Final
AVCA	2	2	1	1	1	1	1	1	1	1	1	1	1	1	1	1	1	1
