= Charlie Wade =

American volleyball coach

Current position
- Title: Head coach
- Team: Hawaii
- Conference: Big West
- Record: 349–136

Biographical details
- Born: October 8, 1963 (age 63); Redondo Beach, California
- Education: Cal State Fullerton (1991)

Coaching career (HC unless noted)

Women's volleyball
- 1987–1988: Cal State Fullerton (assistant)
- 1995–1997: Hawaii (assistant)
- 1998–2005: Hawaii (associate)
- 2006–2008: Pacific (CA)

Men's volleyball
- 2010–present: Hawaii

Head coaching record
- Overall: 349–136 (men's); 38–46 (women's)
- Tournaments: 12–5 (NCAA)

Accomplishments and honors

Championships
- 3 NCAA Division I (2021, 2022, 2026); 4 Big West tournament (2019, 2022, 2023 2025); 3 Big West regular season (2021, 2023, 2026)

Awards
- AVCA Coach of the Year (2019); 3× Big West Coach of the Year (2022, 2023, 2025)

Charlie Wade (born October 8, 1963) is the head coach of the Hawaii Rainbow Warriors volleyball team.

== Coaching career ==
Wade spent 11 years at the University of Hawai'i with the Rainbow Wahine volleyball staff, nine as an associate coach to Dave Shoji, help guiding Hawaii to 11 conference championships, 11 consecutive NCAA tournament appearances, six Regional Finals, and four Final Fours. During that time span, Hawaii held a conference record of 160-1, an overall record of 310-39 and an NCAA Championship match in 1996. Wade was also instrumental in producing eight All-Americans and 18 All-America awards, including two National Players of the Year.

Wade departed Hawaii after the 2005 season to accept the head coaching position for the women's team at Pacific. Wade served as head coach of the women's volleyball program at the University of the Pacific from 2006–2008.

After being out of coaching for a year, Wade was named head coach for the men's team at the University of Hawaii following the resignation of Mike Wilton.

In 2019, Wade coached the program’s first conference champion after UH defeated Long Beach State in five-sets to capture the Big West crown and earned the program's first automatic berth into the NCAA Tournament. Because of this historic milestone for the program, Wade was named 2019 AVCA Coach of the Year. He then guided the program to another Big West Championship in 2022 and consecutive NCAA National Championships in 2021 and 2022.

In 2023, Wade guided the program to another Big West Championship, secure them an automatic berth into the NCAA Tournament, ultimately losing to the UCLA Bruins in the championship match.

In 2025, Wade not only led the program to a Big West Championship and NCAA appearance, he also became the winningest head coach in UH mens volleyball history with a record of 319-131, surpassing Mike Wilton record of 316-167.

== Personal life and education ==
In 1981, Wade graduated Warsaw Community High School (Warsaw, IN), and received a bachelor's degree in kinesiology from Cal State Fullerton in 1991.

Wade is married to former University of Washington volleyball player Tani Martin, with whom he has three sons, Makana, Kainoa & Kekoa. His oldest son Makana is on the coaching staff for the Hawaii Rainbow Warriors volleyball team. His second son, Kainoa, started his collegiate volleyball tenure in 2024 at the University of Hawaii.

=== Misconduction allegation ===
In April 2019, Wade was put under investigation for misconduct against a female player in California when he was coaching a club volleyball team, an allegation which led to the resignation of Long Beach State assistant Scott Touzinsky. Wade was cleared of all misconduct by the United States Center for SafeSport in January 2020, and was able to claim his AVCA coach of the year award.

== Head coaching record ==
=== Women's ===
Record table
Season	Team	Overall	Conference	Standing	Postseason
Pacific Tigers (Big West Conference) (2006–2008)
2006	Pacific	8–21	3–11		
2007	Pacific	18–9	9–7		
2008	Pacific	12–16	10–6		
Pacific:		38–46 (.452)	22–24 (.478)		
Total:		38–46 (.452)			

=== Men's ===
Record table
Season	Team	Overall	Conference	Standing	Postseason
Hawaii Rainbow Warriors (Mountain Pacific Sports Federation) (2010–2017)
2010	Hawaii	19–10	14–8	4th	
2011	Hawaii	15–13	13–9	5th	
2012	Hawaii	7–20	4–18	12th	
2013	Hawaii	11–17	10–14	8th	
2014	Hawaii	15–12	13–11	9th	
2015	Hawaii	24–7	18–4	2nd	NCAA Play-In
2016	Hawaii	16–12	11–11	7th	
2017	Hawaii	27–6	14–4	3rd	NCAA Semifinals
Hawaii Rainbow Warriors (Big West Conference) (2018–present)
2018	Hawaii	19–8	6–4	T–2nd	
2019	Hawaii	28–3	8–2	2nd	NCAA Runner-up
2020	Hawaii	15–1 (Note: Season not played past March 6 due to COVID-19 pandemic)	0–0	–	Postseason not held
2021	Hawaii	17–1	10–0	1st	NCAA Champion
2022	Hawaii	27–5	7–3	2nd	NCAA Champion
2023	Hawaii	29–3	9–1	T–1st	NCAA Runner-up
2024	Hawaii	23–7	5–5	3rd	
2025	Hawaii	27–6	7–3	2nd	NCAA Semifinals
2026	Hawaii	30–5	9–1	1st	NCAA Champion
Hawaii:		349–136 (.720)	158–98 (.617)		
Total:		349–136 (.720)			
National champion Postseason invitational champion Conference regular season champion Conference regular season and conference tournament champion Division regular season champion Division regular season and conference tournament champion Conference tournament champion
