= 2019 Big West Conference men's volleyball tournament =

2019 Big West Conference Men's Volleyball Tournament
- Classification: Division I/II
- Teams: 6
- Site: Stan Sheriff Center; Honolulu, Hawaii
- Champions: Hawai'i (1st title)
- Winning coach: Charlie Wade (1st title)
- MVP: Stijn van Tilburg (Hawaii)
- Attendance: 10,300
- Television: SPEC HI
- Big West Conference Men's Volleyball Tournaments

2019 Big West Conference men's volleyball standings
	Conf.				Overall
Team	W		L	PCT	W		L	PCT
No. 2 Long Beach State ‍†‍‍^{y}	10	–	0	1.000	28	–	2	.933
No. 1 Hawaii ‍‍‡‍^{y}	8	–	2	.800	28	–	3	.903
No. 5 UC Santa Barbara ‍‍‍	4	–	5	.444	18	–	10	.643
No. 8 UC Irvine ‍‍‍	4	–	5	.444	18	–	11	.621
No. 12 Cal State Northridge ‍‍‍	2	–	7	.222	13	–	14	.481
UC San Diego ‍‍‍	0	–	9	.000	7	–	20	.259
† – Conference champion ‡ – Big West tournament champion y – Invited to the NCAA tournament Rankings from AVCA

The 2019 Big West Conference men's volleyball tournament was a postseason men's volleyball tournament for the Big West Conference during the 2019 NCAA Division I & II men's volleyball season. It was held from April 18 through April 20, 2019 at University of Hawaii's Stan Sheriff Center. The winner received the conference's automatic bid to the 2019 NCAA Volleyball Tournament.

== Seeds ==
All six teams were eligible for the postseason, with the top two seeds receiving byes to the semifinals. Teams were seeded by record within the conference, with a tiebreaker system to seed teams with identical conference records.

Seed	School	Conference	Tiebreaker
1	Long Beach State	10–0	–
2	Hawai'i	8–2	–
3	UC Irvine	4–5	2–0 vs. UCSB
4	UCSB	4–5	0–2 vs. UC Irvine
5	CSUN	2–7	–
6	UC San Diego	0–9	–

== Schedule and results ==
Time Network	Matchup	Score	Attendance	Broadcasters
Quarterfinals – Thursday, April 18
5:00 pm Big West TV/SPEC	No. 3 UC Irvine vs. No. 6 UC San Diego	3–0 (26–24, 25–15, 25–14)	7,287	Kanoa Leahey & Lisa Strand Ma'a
7:30 pm Big West TV/SPEC	No. 4 UCSB vs. No. 5 CSUN	3-2 (25-16, 25–27, 26–28, 25–13, 15–9)	7,287	Kanoa Leahey & Ryan Kalei Tsuji
Semifinals – Friday, April 19
5:00 pm Big West TV/SPEC	No. 1 Long Beach State vs. No. 4 UCSB	3–1 (25–19, 21–25, 25–18, 25–17)	8,534	Kanoa Leahey & Lisa Strand Ma'a
7:30 pm Big West TV/SPEC	No. 2 Hawai'i vs. No. 3 UC Irvine	3–0 (25–17, 25–16, 25–18)	8,534	Kanoa Leahey & Ryan Kalei Tsuji
Championship – Saturday, April 20
8:00 pm Big West TV/SPEC	No. 1 Long Beach State vs. No. 2 Hawai'i	2–3 (15–25, 23–25, 25–22, 25–20, 8–15)	10,300	Kanoa Leahey & Ryan Kalei Tsuji
Game times are Hawaiian Time. Rankings denote tournament seeding.

== Bracket ==
Quarterfinals; Thursday, April 18
4	UCSB	3
5	CSUN	2
3	UC Irvine	3
6	UC San Diego	0

Semifinals; Friday, April 19
1	Long Beach State	3
4	UCSB	1
2	Hawai'i	3
3	UC Irvine	0

Championship; Saturday, April 20
1	Long Beach State	2
2	Hawai'i	3

Hawai'i won the 2019 Big West Conference men's volleyball tournament. The title is their first Big West men's volleyball title.
