= 2025 UC Irvine Anteaters men's volleyball team =

American college men's volleyball season

2025 UC Irvine Anteaters men's volleyball

Big West Tournament, Semifinals
- Conference: Big West Conference

Ranking
- Coaches: No. 5
- Record: 21–7 (6-4 Big West)
- Head coach: David Kniffin (13th season)
- Assistant coaches: Ron Larsen (2nd season); Michael Brinkley (2nd season); Marty Ross (1st season)
- Home stadium: Bren Events Center; Crawford Hall

The 2025 UC Irvine Anteaters men's volleyball team is the varsity intercollegiate volleyball program of the University of California, Irvine. The team's home venue is Bren Events Center located on campus in Irvine, California. They also play at Crawford Hall for smaller games. UCI has been a member of the Big West Conference since the 2017-18 season, when the league began sponsoring the sport. Despite finishing the regular season ranked 4th in the nation, 4th in RPI, 4th in KPI, and 1st in strength of schedule, UC Irvine did not receive an at-large bid to the NCAA tournament. They end the season falling 1-3 against eventual conference tournament champion Hawai'i, and dropping to 5th in the nation having not played in the tournament.

2025 Big West Conference men's volleyball standings
	Conf.				Overall
Team	W		L	PCT	W		L	PCT
No. 1 Long Beach State ‍†‍‍^{y}	8	–	2	.800	30	–	3	.909
No. 3 Hawaii ‍‍‡‍^{y}	7	–	3	.700	27	–	6	.818
No. 5 UC Irvine ‍‍‍	6	–	4	.600	21	–	7	.750
No. 10 UC San Diego ‍‍‍	3	–	7	.300	18	–	12	.600
No. 17 UC Santa Barbara ‍‍‍	3	–	7	.300	12	–	16	.429
No. 9 Cal State Northridge ‍‍‍	3	–	7	.300	18	–	11	.621
† – Conference champion ‡ – Big West tournament champion y – Invited to the NCAA tournament Rankings from AVCA

== Previous season ==
Last season, UC Irvine finished with a 20–11 record, going 7–3 in the Big West, and finishing second in the conference. They received an at-large bid to the 2024 NCAA men's volleyball tournament, along with conference champion Long Beach State. The Anteaters took 5 sets and lost 3, falling to the eventual champion, the UCLA Bruins in the semifinals 2–3. UC Irvine finished the season ranked 4th in the nation.

== Preseason ==
=== Preseason All-Big West Team ===
Both the preseason All-Big West team, and the Big West Coaches' Poll were released on December 19, 2024.

Preseason All-Big West Team
Player	No.	Position	Class
Maxim Grigoriev	23	Middle Blocker	Junior
Hilir Henno	20	Outside Hitter	Senior

=== Big West Coaches' Poll ===
Coaches' Poll
Pos.	Team	Points
1	Long Beach State	24 (4)
2	UC Irvine	21 (2)
3	Hawai'i	18
4	UC Santa Barbara	12
5	CSUN	8
6	UC San Diego	7

== Roster ==
2025 UC Irvine Anteaters Roster
Libero/Defensive Specialists: 1 Shane Atiken - (redshirt) RS Freshman; Setters: 2 Micah Tumas - Freshman; 12 Joe Karlous – Graduate Student; 15 Cameron Kosty - Freshman (also listed as an opposite hitter); 22 Aidan Schulten - RS Sophomore; 24 Aidan Rigg - (redshirt) RS Freshman	Middle Blockers: 7 Micah Goss - Freshman; 8 Lukas Winn – Freshman; 10 Nicolas Restrepo – (redshirt) RS Freshman; 11 Kobe Brown – (redshirt) RS Freshman; 13 Beck Weber - (redshirt) RS Sophomore; 19 Alec Apelian - Freshman; 23 Maxim Grigoriev - Junior	Outside Hitters: 6 Tim Ennis – Freshman; 9 Nolan Flexen – Senior; 16 Aidan Cuppett – Freshman; 20 Hilir Henno - Senior; Opposite Hitters: 5 William D'Arcy – Junior; 14 Andon Kiriakou – Sophomore

=== Coaches ===
2025 UC Irvine Anteaters Coaching Staff
- David Kniffin – head coach – 13th year
- Ron Larsen – assistant coach – 2nd year
- Michael Brinkley – assistant coach – 2nd year
- Marty Ross – assistant coach – 1st year

== Schedule ==
Legend
	Anteaters win
	Anteaters loss
	Postponement
*	Non-Conference Game

2025 UC Irvine Anteaters Men's Volleyball Game Log (21-7)
Regular season (20–6)

January (6–0)
Date	TV	Opponent	Rank	Stadium	Score	Sets	Attendance	Overall	BWC
UC Santa Barbara Invitational
January 9	-	vs. Menlo*	No. 3	The Thunderdome; Santa Barbara, California	3-0	(25–14, 25–10, 25–21)	100	1–0	–
January 10	-	vs. Tusculum*	No. 3	The Thunderdome	3-0	(25–12, 25–14, 25–14)	221	2–0	—
January 11	-	vs. Missouri S&T*	No. 3	The Thunderdome	3-0	(25–18, 25–21, 25–14)	157	3-0	—
January 22	ESPN+	No. 5 BYU*	No. 2	Bren Events Center; Irvine, California	3-2	(25–17, 21–25, 25–23, 24–26, 15–12)	1,518	4-0	—
January 24	ESPN+	No. 5 BYU*	No. 2	Bren Events Center	3-0	(25–21, 25–12, 25–19)	2,823	5-0	—
January 31	ESPN+	at No. 9 Stanford*	No. 2	Burnham Pavilion; Stanford, California	3-0	(25–19, 25–20, 25–23)	824	6-0	—

February (4–3)
Date	TV	Opponent	Rank	Stadium	Score	Sets	Attendance	Overall	BWC
February 1	ESPN+	at No. 9 Stanford*	No. 2	Burnham Pavilion; Stanford, California	3-0	(25–23, 25–18, 33–31)	1,423	7-0	—
February 8	ESPN+	at Concordia Irvine*	No. 2	CU Arena; Irvine, California	3-1	(28–26, 25–17, 26–28, 25–15)	273	8-0	—
February 12	ESPN+	No. 5 USC*	No. 2	Bren Events Center	3-2	(25–20, 26–28, 25–21, 18–25, 26–24)	2,199	9-0	—
February 14	ESPN+ & B1G+	at No. 5 USC*	No. 2	Galen Center; Los Angeles, California	3-0	(25–18, 25–22, 25–21)	1,058	10-0	—
February 19	ESPN+	No. 3 UCLA*	No. 2	Bren Events Center	0-3	(22–25, 17–25, 23–25)	2,927	10-1	—
February 22	B1G+	at No. 3 UCLA*	No. 2	Pauley Pavilion; Los Angeles, California	2-3	(25–21, 21–25, 25–20, 14–25, 10–15)	2,512	10-2	—
February 28	ESPN+	at No. 4 Hawai'i	No. 3	Stan Sheriff Center; Honolulu, Hawai'i	0-3	(21–25, 24–26, 22–25)	7,849	10-3	0–1

March (5–2)
Date	TV	Opponent	Rank	Stadium	Score	Sets	Attendance	Overall	BWC
March 2	ESPN+	at No. 4 Hawai'i	No. 3	Stan Sheriff Center; Honolulu, Hawai'i	0-3	(22–25, 19–25, 20–25)	8,087	10-4	0–2
March 7	ESPN+	Pepperdine*	No. 4	Bren Events Center	3-0	(25–17, 25–21, 25–19)	1,380	11-4	—
March 8	ESPN+	Sacred Heart*	No. 4	Bren Events Center	3-0	(25–17, 25–16, 25–13)	632	12-4	—
March 21	ESPN+	Daemen*	No. 5	Recreation Athletic Complex; Fairfax, Virginia	3-0	(25-18, 25-18, 25-14	0	13-4	—
March 22	ESPN+	George Mason*	No. 5	Recreation Athletic Complex; Fairfax, Virginia	3-0	(25–21, 25–17, 25–18)	875	14-4	—
March 28	ESPN+	at No. 1 Long Beach State	No. 5	Walter Pyramid; Long Beach, California	3-0	(27–25, 25–19, 25–19)	4,676	15-4	1–2
March 29	ESPN+	No. 1 Long Beach State	No. 5	Bren Events Center	0-3	(23–25, 19–25, 27–29)	4,758	15-5	1–3

April (5-1)
Date	TV	Opponent	Rank	Stadium	Score	Sets	Attendance	Overall	BWC
April 4	ESPN+	at No. 10 UC San Diego	No. 4	Lion Tree Arena; La Jolla, California	1-3	(25-23, 17-25, 22-25, 22-25)	1,195	15-6	1-4
April 5	ESPN+	No. 10 UC San Diego	No. 4	Bren Events Center	3-0	(27-25, 25-21, 25-16)	1,581	16-6	2-4
April 10	ESPN+	at No. 18 UC Santa Barbara	No. 5	The Thunderdome; Santa Barbara, California	3-2	(25-19, 17-25, 19-25, 30-28, 15-12)	751	17-6	3-4
April 12	ESPN+	No. 18 UC Santa Barbara	No. 5	Bren Events Center	3-0	(25-19, 25-17, 25-17)	1,612	18-6	4-4
April 17	ESPN+	No. 9 CSUN	No. 4	Bren Events Center	3-0	(25-14, 25-16, 25-18)	1,843	19-6	5-4
April 19	ESPN+	at No. 9 CSUN	No. 4	The Matadome; Northridge, California	3-2	(25-21, 20-25, 22-25, 25-18, 15-13)	362	20-6	6-4

Postseason (1–1)

2025 Big West Conference men's volleyball tournament (1–1)
Date	TV	Opponent	Rank	Stadium	Score	Sets	Attendance	Record	Postseason Record
April 24	ESPN+	vs. No. 9 CSUN (6); First Round	No. 4 (3)	Stan Sheriff Center; Honolulu, Hawai'i	3-2	(22-25, 25-18, 16-25, 25-23, 19-17)	4,649	21-6	1-0
April 25	ESPN+	vs. No. 3 Hawai'i (2); Semifinals	No. 4 (3)	Stan Sheriff Center; Honolulu, Hawai'i	1-3	(21-25, 25-15, 21-25, 23-25)	7,209	21-7	1-1
*Non-conference game. ^{#}Rankings from AVCA Poll. (#) Tournament seedings in parentheses. All times are in Pacific.

== Awards and honors ==
=== Regular season ===
All-Big West Team
Honors	Player	Position	Date awarded
Offensive Player of the Week	Hilir Henno	Outside Hitter	January 13, 2025
Offensive Player of the Week	Nolan Flexen	Outside Hitter	January 27, 2025
Defensive Player of the Week & Freshman of the Week	Micah Goss	Middle Blocker	January 27, 2025
Setter of the Week	Joe Karlous	Outside Hitter	January 27, 2025
Offensive Player of the Week	Hilir Henno	Outside Hitter	February 3, 2025
Setter of the Week	Joe Karlous	Outside Hitter	February 3, 2025
Offensive Player of the Week	Nolan Flexen	Outside Hitter	February 17, 2025
Defensive Player of the Week	Maxim Grigoriev	Middle Blocker	February 17, 2025
Offensive Player of the Week	Hilir Henno	Outside Hitter	March 10, 2025
Offensive Player of the Week	Hilir Henno	Outside Hitter	March 24, 2025
Defensive Player of the Week	Shane Aitken	Libero	April 14, 2025

=== Postseason ===
AVCA All-Americans
Honors	Player	Position	Date awarded
First Team	Hilir Henno	Outside Hitter	May 05, 2025
Second Team	Nolan Flexen	Outside Hitter	May 05, 2025
Honorable Mention	Shane Aitken	Libero	May 05, 2025
Honorable Mention	William D'Arcy	Outside Hitter	May 05, 2025
Honorable Mention	Micah Goss	Middle Blocker	May 05, 2025
Honorable Mention	Maxim Grigoriev	Middle Blocker	May 05, 2025

All-Big West Team
Honors	Player	Position	Date awarded
First Team	Nolan Flexen	Outside Hitter	April 23, 2025
First Team	Maxim Grigoriev	Middle Blocker	April 23, 2025
First Team	Hilir Henno	Outside Hitter	April 23, 2025
Honorable Mention	William D'Arcy	Opposite Hitter	April 23, 2025

Big West All-Freshman Team
Honors	Player	Position	Date awarded
First Team	Micah Goss	Middle Blocker	April 23, 2025

== Rankings ==
Ranking movements Legend: ██ Increase in ranking ██ Decrease in ranking ( ) = First-place votes
	Week																	
Poll	Pre	1	2	3	4	5	6	7	8	9	10	11	12	13	14	15	16	Final
AVCA	3	3	2	2 (1)	2 (2)	2 (1)	2	3	4	4	5	5	4	5	4	4	4	5
