= 2025 Hawaii Rainbow Warriors volleyball team =

2025 Hawaii Rainbow Warriors volleyball

2025 Big West Conference men's volleyball tournament, Champions

NCAA Tournament, Semi Finals
- Conference: Big West Conference
- Record: 27-6 (7-3 Big West)
- Head coach: Charlie Wade (16th season)
- Associate head coach: Milan Zarkovic (12th season)
- Assistant coaches: Kupono Fey (3rd season); Chad Giesseman (2nd season)
- Home stadium: Stan Sheriff Center

The 2025 Hawaii Rainbow Warriors volleyball team is the varsity intercollegiate volleyball program of the University of Hawaii at Manoa (UH). The Rainbow Warriors, led by 16th-year head coach Charlie Wade, played their home matches at the Stan Sheriff Center on the UH campus in the Honolulu neighborhood of Mānoa. The Rainbow Warriors, members of the Big West Conference, were picked third in the Big West preseason coaches poll, with Long Beach State selected first and UC Irvine second. Hawaiʻi entered the 2025 season looking to return to national prominence following their absence from the 2024 NCAA Tournament. The team ultimately won the Big West Conference Championship to secure an automatic bid to the NCAA Tournament. The Rainbow Warriors advanced to the national semifinals before falling to the UCLA Bruins, concluding their season.

2025 Big West Conference men's volleyball standings
	Conf.				Overall
Team	W		L	PCT	W		L	PCT
No. 1 Long Beach State ‍†‍‍^{y}	8	–	2	.800	30	–	3	.909
No. 3 Hawaii ‍‍‡‍^{y}	7	–	3	.700	27	–	6	.818
No. 5 UC Irvine ‍‍‍	6	–	4	.600	21	–	7	.750
No. 10 UC San Diego ‍‍‍	3	–	7	.300	18	–	12	.600
No. 17 UC Santa Barbara ‍‍‍	3	–	7	.300	12	–	16	.429
No. 9 Cal State Northridge ‍‍‍	3	–	7	.300	18	–	11	.621
† – Conference champion ‡ – Big West tournament champion y – Invited to the NCAA tournament Rankings from AVCA

== Previous season ==
Last season, the University of Hawaii finished wit a 23–7 record, going 5–5 in the Big West. The Warriors ended the season with a loss to UC Irvine in the Big West Championship Finals.

== Preseason ==
Both the preseason All-Big West team, and the Big West Coaches' Poll were released on December 19, 2024. Hawaii was picked to finish third in the Big West Conference and had one player make preseason team.

=== Big West Coaches' Poll ===
Coaches' Poll
Pos.	Team	Points
1	Long Beach State	24 (4)
3	UC Irvine	21 (2)
2	Hawai'i	18
4	UC Santa Barbara	12
5	CSUN	8
6	UC San Diego	7

=== Preseason All-Big West Team ===
Preseason All-Big West Team
Player	No.	Position	Class
Tread Rosenthal	13	Setter	Sophomore

== Roster ==
2025 Hawaii Rainbow Warriors Roster
Defensive Specialist/Libero: 5 'Eleu Choy - Senior; 6 Matthew Wheels - Freshman; Middle Blockers: 8 Kurt Nusterer - (redshirt) Junior; 9 Justin Todd - (redshirt) Freshman; 14 Presley Longfellow - Junior; 16 Ofeck Hazan - Freshman; 19 Alex Parks - (redshirt) Sophomore; 22 Zachary Thompson - Senior	Outside Hitters: 7 Adrien Roure - Freshman; 9 Justin Todd - Freshman; 11 Finn Kearney - Freshman (also listed as an opposite hitter); 15 Kai Taylor - (redshirt) Freshman (also listed as a libero); 20 Kawai Hong - Senior; 23 Louis Sakanoko - Sophomore (also listed as an opposite hitter); 24 Clay Wieter - Senior	Opposite Hitters: 4 Kainoa Wade - Freshman; 10 Kristian Titriyski - Freshman; Setters: 1 Victor Lowe - Freshman; 3 Vladimir Kubr - Junior; 13 Tread Rosenthal - Sophomore

=== Coaches ===
2025 Hawaii Rainbow Warriors Coaching Staff
- Charlie Wade – head coach – 16th year
- Milan Zarkovic – associate head coach – 12th year
- Kupono Fey - assistant coach - 3rd year
- Chad Giesseman – assistant coach – 2nd year

== Schedule ==
Date Time	TV/Radio	Opponent	Rank	Stadium	Score	Sets	Attendance	Overall	BWC
Preseason Exhibition Match
Dec. 30 6 p.m.	Not Broadcast	British Columbia	#4	Stan Sheriff Center Honolulu, HI	W, 3–0	25–18 25–14 25–19	—	0-0	—
Regular Season Matches
Jan. 3 7 p.m.	SPEC	McKendree	#4	Stan Sheriff Center Honolulu, HI	W, 3–1	25-20 20–25 25–22 25–22	5371	1-0	—
Jan. 5 5 p.m.	ESPN Honolulu	McKendree	#4	Stan Sheriff Center Honolulu, HI	W, 3-0	25-20 25–19 25–16	5187	2-0	—
Jan. 8 7 p.m.	SPEC	Harvard	#4	Stan Sheriff Center Honolulu, HI	W, 3-0	25-18 25–17 25–20	5035	3-0	—
Jan. 10 2 p.m.	ESPN Honolulu	Harvard	#4	Stan Sheriff Center Honolulu, HI	W, 3-2	25-17 25–27 25–15 21–25 16–14	5676	4-0	—
Jan. 15; 7 p.m.	SPEC	Princeton	#4	Stan Sheriff Center Honolulu, HI	W, 3-1	25-20 25–18 20–25 25–17	5775	5-0	—
Jan. 17; 7 p.m.	ESPN Honolulu	Princeton	#4	Stan Sheriff Center Honolulu, HI	W, 3-0	25-17 25–17 25–23	7152	6-0	—
Jan. 31; 4 p.m.	BYUtv	@ BYU	#4	Smith Fieldhouse Provo, UT	W, 3-2	20-25 25–22 23–25 25–16 22–20	5019	7-0	—
Feb. 1; 4 p.m.	BYUtv	@ BYU	#4	Smith Fieldhouse Provo, UT	W, 3-1	25-18 25–22 22–25 25–22	5387	8-0	—
Feb. 5; 7 p.m.	SPEC	Stanford	#4	Stan Sheriff Center Honolulu, HI	W, 3-2	23-25 25–20 25–19 20–25 16–14	6832	9-0	—
Feb. 7; 7 p.m.	SPEC	Stanford	#4	Stan Sheriff Center Honolulu, HI	L, 1-3	25-19 24–26 23–25 24–26	8559	9-1	—
Feb. 20; 2 p.m.	ESPN+	@ Belmont Abbey	#4	Wheeler Center Belmont Abbey Belmont, NC	W, 3-0	25-15 25–15 25–23	1145	10-1	—
Feb. 21; 1 p.m.	ESPN+	@ Queens (N.C.)	#4	Curry Arena Charlotte, NC	W, 3-0	25-19 25–21 25–16	917	11-1	—
Feb. 22; 6 a.m.	ESPN+	@ Catawba College	#4	Goodman Arena Salisbury, NC	W, 3-1	25-19 25–11 25–27 25–19	780	12-1	—
Feb. 22; 1 p.m.	ESPN+	@ Queens (N.C.)	#4	Curry Arena Charlotte, NC	W, 3-1	25-20 25–20 22–25 25–20	753	13-1	—
Feb. 28; 7 p.m.	SPEC	UC Irvine (Big West Conference Play)	#4	Stan Sheriff Center Honolulu, HI	W, 3-0	25-21 26–24 25–22	7849	14-1	1-0
Mar. 2; 5 p.m.	SPEC	UC Irvine (Big West Conference Play)	#4	Stan Sheriff Center Honolulu, HI	W, 3-0	25-22 25–19 25–20	8087	15-1	2-0
Mar. 5; 7 p.m.	SPEC	Lindenwood	#3	Stan Sheriff Center Honolulu, HI	W, 3-0	25-13 25–20 27–25	5382	16-1	2-0
Mar. 7 7 p.m.	CBS Sports Radio Hawai'i	Lindenwood	#3	Stan Sheriff Center Honolulu, HI	W, 3-1	25-16 23–25 27–25 25–23	5953	17-1	2-0
OUTRIGGER Invitational
Mar. 13 7 p.m.	SPEC	Ball State	#3	Stan Sheriff Center Honolulu, HI	W, 3-0	25-19 25–13 29–27	5690	18-1	2-0
Mar. 14 7 p.m.	SPEC	Penn State	#3	Stan Sheriff Center Honolulu, HI	W, 3-0	25-13 25–23 25–12	6692	19-1	2-0
Mar. 15 7 p.m.	SPEC	USC	#3	Stan Sheriff Center Honolulu, HI	L, 1-3	21-25 20–25 28–26 21–25	8599	19-2	2-0
Big West Conference Play
Mar. 28 7 p.m.	SPEC	UC San Diego	#4	Stan Sheriff Center Honolulu, HI	W, 3-0	25-21 25–21 25–18	6801	20-2	3-0
Mar. 29 7 p.m.	SPEC	UC San Diego	#4	Stan Sheriff Center Honolulu, HI	W, 3-1	27-25 25–23 17–25 25–18	7481	21-2	4-0
Apr. 4 3 p.m.	ESPN+	@ CSUN	#5	Premier America Credit Union Arena Northridge, CA	L, 0-3	17-25 20–25 20–25	700	21-3	4-1
Apr. 5 3 p.m.	ESPN+	@ CSUN	#5	Premier America Credit Union Arena Northridge, CA	W, 3-0	25-18 25–21 29–27	1059	22-3	5-1
Apr. 11 7 p.m.	SPEC	Long Beach State	#4	Stan Sheriff Center Honolulu, HI	L, 1-3	21-25 18–25 25–18 21–25	10300	22-4	5-2
Apr. 12 7 p.m.	SPEC	Long Beach State	#4	Stan Sheriff Center Honolulu, HI	W, 3-2	21-25 25–20 18–25 25–19 15–13	10300	23-4	6-2
Apr. 18 4 p.m.	ESPN+	@ UC Santa Barbara	#3	Thunderdome Santa Barbara, CA	W, 3-1	25-22 19–25 25–22 25–20	727	24-4	7-2
Apr. 19 4 p.m.	ESPN+	@ UC Santa Barbara	#3	Thunderdome Santa Barbara, CA	L, 0-3	22-25 22–25 25–27	713	24-5	7-3
OUTRIGGER Big West Championship presented by the Hawaiian Islands
Apr. 25 7 p.m.	SPEC	UC Irvine (Semifinals)	—	Stan Sheriff Center Honolulu, HI	W, 3-1	25-21 15–25 25–21 25–23	7209	25-5	
Apr. 26 7 p.m.	SPEC	Long Beach State (Championship)	—	Stan Sheriff Center Honolulu, HI	W, 3-1	25-21 25–22 21–25 25–22	8576	26-5	
NCAA Championship
May 8 7:30 a.m.	ESPN+	Penn State (Quarterfinals)	—	Covelli Center Columbus, OH	W, 3-1	25-19 21–25 25–23 25–23	—	27-5	—
May 10 2 p.m.	ESPN+	UCLA (Semifinals)	—	Coveli Center Columbus, OH	L, 0-3	14-25 23–25 23–25	3342	27-6	—

== Rankings ==
	Week																	
Poll	Pre	1	2	3	4	5	6	7	8	9	10	11	12	13	14	15	16	Final
AVCA	4	4	4	4	4	4	4	4	3	3	4	4	5	4	3	3	2	3
