= 2019 Midwestern Intercollegiate Volleyball Association tournament =

2019 Midwestern Intercollegiate Volleyball Association standings
	Conf.				Overall
Team	W		L	PCT	W		L	PCT
No. 6 Lewis ‍†‍‡‍^{y}	13	–	1	.929	26	–	6	.813
No. 9 Loyola ‍‍‍	12	–	2	.857	21	–	8	.724
No. 15 Fort Wayne ‍‍‍	8	–	6	.571	17	–	12	.586
McKendree ‍‍‍	7	–	7	.500	13	–	13	.500
Ball State ‍‍‍	6	–	8	.429	15	–	15	.500
Lindenwood ‍‍‍	5	–	9	.357	9	–	19	.321
Ohio State ‍‍‍	5	–	9	.357	10	–	19	.345
Quincy ‍‍‍	0	–	14	.000	5	–	23	.179
† – Conference champion ‡ – 2019 MIVA Tournament champion y- Invited to the NCAA Volleyball Tournament; As of May 4, 2019; Rankings from AVCA

The 2019 Midwestern Intercollegiate Volleyball Association Tournament was the men's volleyball tournament for the Midwestern Intercollegiate Volleyball Association held during the 2019 NCAA Division I & II men's volleyball season. It was held April 13 through April 20, 2019 at campus sites. The winner received the Association's automatic bid to the 2019 NCAA Volleyball Tournament.

== Seeds ==
All eight teams are eligible for the postseason, with the highest seed hosting each round. Teams were seeded by record within the conference, with a tiebreaker system to seed teams with identical conference records.

Seed	School	Conference	Tiebreaker
1	Lewis	13–1	–
2	Loyola	12–2	–
3	Fort Wayne	8–6	–
4	McKendree	7–7	–
5	Ball State	6–8	–
6	Lindenwood	5–9	
7	Ohio State	5–9	
8	Quincy	0–14	–

== Schedule and results ==
Time Network	Matchup	Score	Attendance	Broadcasters
Quarterfinals – Saturday, April 13
5:00 pm YouTube	No. 3 Fort Wayne vs. No. 6 Lindenwood	3–0 (25–12, 25–21, 25–19)	512	Michael Maahs
7:00 pm GLVC SN	No. 4 McKendree vs. No. 5 Ball State	3–2 (25–19, 25–22, 25–27, 27–29, 16–14)	782	Nate Gatter
7:00 pm GLVC SN	No. 1 Lewis vs. No. 8 Quincy	3–0 (25–17, 25–19, 25–20)	327	Adam King & Jacob Sadowski
7:00 pm ESPN3	No. 2 Loyola vs. No. 7 Ohio State	3–1 (25–15, 20–25, 25–14, 25–22)	687	Jason Goch & Ray Gooden
Semifinals – Wednesday, April 17
7:00 pm GLVC SN	No. 1 Lewis vs. No. 4 McKendree	3–0 (25–17, 25–21, 25–17)	237	Adam King & Jacob Sadowski
7:00 pm ESPN3	No. 2 Loyola vs. No. 3 Fort Wayne	3–1 (19–25, 25–21, 25–18, 25–23)	611	Jason Goch & Ray Gooden
Championship – Saturday, April 20
7:00 pm GLVC SN	No. 1 Lewis vs. No. 2 Loyola	3–0 (25–17, 25–18, 25–19)	1,100	Adam King & Jacob Sadowski
Game times are host team times (ET and CT). Rankings denote tournament seeding.

== Bracket ==
Quarterfinals; Saturday, April 13
1	Lewis	3
8	Quincy	0
4	McKendree	3
5	Ball State	2
2	Loyola	3
7	Ohio State	1
3	Fort Wayne	3
6	Lindenwood	0

Semifinals; Wednesday, April 17
1	Lewis	3
4	McKendree	0
2	Loyola	3
3	Fort Wayne	1

Championship; Saturday, April 20
1	Lewis	3
2	Loyola	0
