= 2025 Big West Conference men's volleyball tournament =

West Conference volleyball tournament

2025 Big West Conference Men's Volleyball Tournament
- Classification: Division I/II
- Teams: 6
- Site: Stan Sheriff Center; Honolulu, Hawai'i
- Champions: Hawai'i (4th title)
- Winning coach: Charlie Wade (4th title)
- MVP: Adrien Roure (Hawai'i)
- Attendance: 20,434 (6,811 per match)
- Television: ESPN+ & ESPNU
- Big West Conference Men's Volleyball Tournaments

2025 Big West Conference men's volleyball standings
	Conf.				Overall
Team	W		L	PCT	W		L	PCT
No. 1 Long Beach State ‍†‍‍^{y}	8	–	2	.800	30	–	3	.909
No. 3 Hawaii ‍‍‡‍^{y}	7	–	3	.700	27	–	6	.818
No. 5 UC Irvine ‍‍‍	6	–	4	.600	21	–	7	.750
No. 10 UC San Diego ‍‍‍	3	–	7	.300	18	–	12	.600
No. 17 UC Santa Barbara ‍‍‍	3	–	7	.300	12	–	16	.429
No. 9 Cal State Northridge ‍‍‍	3	–	7	.300	18	–	11	.621
† – Conference champion ‡ – Big West tournament champion y – Invited to the NCAA tournament Rankings from AVCA

The 2025 Big West Conference men's volleyball tournament is a postseason men's volleyball tournament for the Big West Conference during the 2025 NCAA Division I & II men's volleyball season. It was held April 24 through April 26, 2025 at the Stan Sheriff Center in Honolulu, Hawai'i. The winner received the conference's automatic bid to the 2025 NCAA Volleyball Tournament.

== Seeds ==
All six teams were eligible for the postseason, with the top two seeds receiving byes to the semifinals. Teams were seeded by record within the conference, with a tiebreaker system to seed teams with identical conference records.

Seed	School	Conference	Tiebreaker
1	Long Beach State	8-2	–
2	Hawai'i	7-3	–
3	UC Irvine	6-4	–
4	UC San Diego	3-7	1-1 vs. UC Irvine
5	UC Santa Barbara	3-7	0-2 vs. UC Irvine; 2-0 vs. CSUN
6	CSUN	3-7	0-2 vs. UC Irvine; 0-2 vs. UC Santa Barbara

== Schedule and results ==
The entire tournament was televised on Spectrum Hawai'i and simulcast live on ESPN+.

Time Network	Matchup	Score	Attendance	Broadcasters
Quarterfinals – Thursday, April 24
4:30 pm ESPN+	No. 4 UC San Diego vs. No. 5 UC Santa Barbara	3-2 (20-25, 27-25, 25-22, 23–25, 15–13)	4,649	Kanoa Leahey & Chris McLachlin
7:00 pm ESPN+	No. 3 UC Irvine vs. No. 6 CSUN	3-2 (22-25, 25–18, 16-25, 25-23, 19-17)	4,649	Kanoa Leahey & Chris McLachlin
Semifinals – Friday, April 25
5:00 pm ESPN+	No. 1 Long Beach State vs. No. 4 UC San Diego	3-0 (25-18, 25–23, 25–17)	7,209	Kanoa Leahey & Chris McLachlin
7:30 pm ESPN+	No. 2 Hawai'i vs. No. 3 UC Irvine	3-1 (25-21, 15–25, 25-21, 25-23)	7,209	Kanoa Leahey & Chris McLachlin
Championship – Saturday, April 26
7:00 pm ESPN+	No. 1 Long Beach State vs. No. 2 Hawai'i	1-3 (21-25, 22–25, 25–21, 22-25)	8,576	Paul Sunderland & Kevin Barnett
Game times are HST. Rankings denote tournament seeding.

== Bracket ==
Quarterfinals; Thursday, April 24
4	UC San Diego	3
5	UC Santa Barbara	2
3	UC Irvine	3
6	CSUN	2

Semifinals; Friday, April 25
1	Long Beach State	3
4	UC San Diego	0
2	Hawai'i	3
3	UC Irvine	1

Championship; Saturday, April 26
1	Long Beach State	1
2	Hawai'i	3
