= 2019 Mountain Pacific Sports Federation men's volleyball tournament =

Men's volleyball tournament

2019 Mountain Pacific Sports Federation Men's Volleyball Tournament
- Classification: Division I/II
- Teams: 7
- Site: Firestone Fieldhouse; Malibu, CA
- Champions: Pepperdine (5th title)
- Winning coach: David Hunt (1st title)
- MVP: David Wieczorek (Pepperdine)
- Attendance: 1,787
- Television: MPSF TV
- Mountain Pacific Sports Federation Men's Volleyball Tournaments

2019 Mountain Pacific Sports Federation volleyball standings
	Conf.				Overall
Team	W		L	PCT	W		L	PCT
No. 3 Pepperdine ‍†‍‡‍^{y}	9	–	3	.750	23	–	7	.767
No. 7 UCLA ‍‍‍	8	–	4	.667	19	–	9	.679
No. 4 USC ‍‍‍^{y}	7	–	5	.583	18	–	11	.621
No. 10 Stanford ‍‍‍	6	–	6	.500	15	–	11	.577
No. 11 BYU ‍‍‍	6	–	6	.500	13	–	12	.520
No. 15 Grand Canyon ‍‍‍	3	–	9	.250	13	–	16	.448
No. 13 Concordia Irvine ‍‍‍	3	–	9	.250	14	–	19	.424
† – Conference champion ‡ – 2019 MPSF Tournament champion y- Invited to the NCAA Volleyball Tournament; As of May 4, 2019; Rankings from AVCA

The 2019 Mountain Pacific Sports Federation Volleyball Tournament was a postseason men's volleyball tournament for the Mountain Pacific Sports Federation during the 2019 NCAA Division I & II men's volleyball season. It was held April 13 through April 20, 2018 at campus sites. The winner received The Federation's automatic bid to the 2019 NCAA Volleyball Tournament.

== Seeds ==
All seven teams were eligible for the postseason, with the #1 seed receiving a bye to the semifinals and home court hosting rights for the semifinals and championship. Teams were seeded by record within the conference, with a tiebreaker system to seed teams with identical conference records. The #1 seed played the lowest remaining seed in the semifinals.

Seed	School	Conference	Tiebreaker
1	Pepperdine	9–3	–
2	UCLA	8–4	–
3	USC	7–5	–
4	Stanford	6–6	1–1 vs. BYU with 5 sets won (2–3, 3–1)
5	BYU	6–6	1–1 vs. Stanford with 4 sets won (3–2, 1–3)
6	Grand Canyon	3–9	1–1 vs. Concordia Irvine with 4 sets win (1–3, 3–0)
7	Concorida Irvine	3–9	1–1 vs. Grand Canyon with 3 sets win (3–1, 0–3)

== Schedule and results ==
Time Network	Matchup	Score	Attendance	Broadcasters
Quarterfinals – Saturday, April 13
7:00 pm MPSF TV	No. 2 UCLA vs. No. 7 Concordia Irvine	3–0 (25–21, 25–23, 25–17)	602	Denny Cline & Peter Ashley
7:00 pm MPSF TV	No. 3 USC vs. No. 6 Grand Canyon	3–0 (25–17, 25–19, 25–22)	400	Paul Duchesne
7:00 pm MPSF TV	No. 4 Stanford vs. No. 5 BYU	2–3 (25–18, 16–25, 24–26, 25–19, 14–16)	881	Kevin Danna
Semifinals – Thursday, April 18
5:00 pm MPSF TV	No. 1 Pepperdine vs. No. 5 BYU	3–0 (25–17, 25–23, 25–18)	1,818	Al Epstein
7:30 pm MPSF TV	No. 2 UCLA vs. No. 3 USC	1–3 (21–25, 18–25, 27–25, 23–25)	1,818	Al Epstein
Championship – Saturday, April 20
7:00 pm MPSF TV	No. 1 Pepperdine vs. No. 3 USC	3–0 (25–23, 25–20, 27–25)	1,787	Al Epstein
Game times are PT. Rankings denote tournament seeding.

== Bracket ==
Quarterfinals; Saturday, April 13
1	Pepperdine
(bye)
4	Stanford	2
5	BYU	3
(Pairings are reseeded after the first round)
2	UCLA	3
7	Concordia Irvine	0
3	USC	3
6	Grand Canyon	0

Semifinals; Thursday, April 18; Firestone Fieldhouse; Malibu, CA
1	Pepperdine	3
5	BYU	0
2	UCLA	1
3	USC	3

Championship; Saturday, April 20; Firestone Fieldhouse; Malibu, CA
1	Pepperdine	3
3	USC	0

With their victory over USC, Pepperdine clinched an NCAA Tournament berth and their fifth MPSF Men's Volleyball title.

== All-Tournament Team ==
- David Wieczorek, Pepperdine (MVP)
- Michael Wexter, Pepperdine
- Robert Mullahey, Pepperdine
- Jack Wyett, USC
- Chris Hall, USC
- Davide Gardini, BYU
- Micah Ma'a, UCLA
