= 2019 Eastern Intercollegiate Volleyball Association tournament =

2019 Eastern Intercollegiate Volleyball Association standingsEastern Intercollegiate Volleyball Association
	Conf.				Overall
Team	W		L	PCT	W		L	PCT
No. 13 Princeton ‍†‍‡‍^{y}	13	–	1	.929	18	–	13	.581
George Mason ‍‍‍	10	–	4	.714	17	–	9	.654
Penn State ‍‍‍	10	–	4	.714	15	–	15	.500
Saint Francis ‍‍‍	9	–	5	.643	15	–	14	.517
NJIT ‍‍‍	5	–	9	.357	9	–	17	.346
Harvard ‍‍‍	5	–	9	.357	6	–	16	.273
Sacred Heart ‍‍‍	3	–	11	.214	5	–	16	.238
Charleston (WV) ‍‍‍	1	–	13	.071	9	–	20	.310
† – Conference champion ‡ – EIVA tournament champion y – Invited to the NCAA tournament Rankings from AVCA

The 2019 Eastern Intercollegiate Volleyball Association Tournament was the men's volleyball tournament for the Eastern Intercollegiate Volleyball Association during the 2019 NCAA Division I & II men's volleyball season. It was held April 18 through April 20, 2019 at Princeton University's Dillon Gymnasium. The winner received The Association's automatic bid to the 2019 NCAA Volleyball Tournament.

== Seeds ==
The top four teams qualified for the tournament, with the highest seed hosting each round. Teams were seeded by record within the conference, with a tiebreaker system to seed teams with identical conference records.

Seed	School	Conference	Tiebreaker
1	Princeton	13–1	–
2	George Mason	10–4	2–0 vs. Penn State
3	Penn State	10–4	0–2 vs. George Mason
4	St. Francis	9–5	–
5	NJIT	5–9	1–1 vs. Harvard but won in fewer sets (3–0), Did not qualify
6	Harvard	5–9	1–1 vs. NJIT but won in more sets (3–2), Did not qualify
7	Sacred Heart	3–11	Did not qualify
8	Charleston	1–13	Did not qualify

== Schedule and results ==
Time Network	Matchup	Score	Attendance	Broadcasters
Semifinals – Thursday, April 18
5:00 pm FloVolleyball	No. 2 George Mason vs. No. 3 Penn State	2–3 (22–25, 25–23, 16–25, 25–18, 9–15)	243	Simon Rosenwasser & Devon Peterkin
7:30 pm FloVolleyball	No. 1 Princeton vs. No. 4 St. Francis	3–0 (25–23, 25–21, 25–19)	243	Simon Rosenwasser & Devon Peterkin
Championship – Saturday, April 20
7:00 pm FloVolleyball	No. 1 Princeton vs. No. 3 Penn State	3–2 (28–26, 22–25, 25–18, 20–25, 25–20)	349	Simon Rosenwasser & Devon Peterkin
Game times are ET. Rankings denote tournament seeding.

== Bracket ==
Quarterfinals; Thursday, April 18
1	Princeton	3
4	St. Francis	0
2	George Mason	2
3	Penn State	3

Championship; Saturday, April 20
1	Princeton	3
3	Penn State	2

The title was Princeton's second ever men's volleyball title, the first having occurred back in 1998.
