= 2025 UC San Diego Tritons men's volleyball team =

American college volleyball season

2025 UC San Diego Tritons men's volleyball
- Conference: Big West Conference
- Record: 18–12 (3–7 Big West)
- Head coach: Brad Rostratter (3rd season)
- Assistant coaches: Jorge Collazo (3rd season); Marco Meoni (1st season)
- Home arena: LionTree Arena

2025 Big West Conference men's volleyball standings
	Conf.				Overall
Team	W		L	PCT	W		L	PCT
No. 1 Long Beach State ‍†‍‍^{y}	8	–	2	.800	30	–	3	.909
No. 3 Hawaii ‍‍‡‍^{y}	7	–	3	.700	27	–	6	.818
No. 5 UC Irvine ‍‍‍	6	–	4	.600	21	–	7	.750
No. 10 UC San Diego ‍‍‍	3	–	7	.300	18	–	12	.600
No. 17 UC Santa Barbara ‍‍‍	3	–	7	.300	12	–	16	.429
No. 9 Cal State Northridge ‍‍‍	3	–	7	.300	18	–	11	.621
† – Conference champion ‡ – Big West tournament champion y – Invited to the NCAA tournament Rankings from AVCA

The 2025 UC San Diego Tritons men's volleyball team represented the University of California San Diego in the 2025 NCAA Division I & II men's volleyball season. The Tritons, led by third year head coach Brad Rostratter, played their home games at LionTree Arena. The Tritons competed as members of the Big West Conference and were picked to finish sixth in the Big West preseason poll.

== Previous season ==
The Tritons finished the 2024 season 12–15, 4–6 in Big West play to finish in fourth place. They lost to Cal State Northridge 0–3 in the 2024 Big West Conference men's volleyball tournament.

== Preseason ==
The Big West Conference released its preseason coaches' poll on December 19, 2024. The Tritons were predicted to finish sixth in the conference with 7 points.

== Roster ==
2025 UC San Diego Tritons roster
Defensive specialist/libero: 5 Evan Boyle - Junior; 17 Keegan Cook - (redshirt) Freshman; Middle blockers: 9 Leo Wiemelt - Sophomore; 12 Nick Rigo - Senior; 14 Jim Garrison - (redshirt) Junior; 19 Charlie Wilson - (redshirt) Freshman; 24 Peter Selcho - (redshirt) Junior	Outside hitters: 4 Sebastian Lara - Senior; 6 Leo Pravednikov - Junior; 7 Matthew Lim - Senior; 10 Josh Schellinger - (redshirt) Junior; 11 Brett Pursley - (redshirt) Junior; 21 Josh Ewert - Junior; 22 Sam Warren - Senior; 23 Ben Warren - Freshman	Opposite hitters: 1 Luke Chandler - (redshirt) Junior; 16 Anthony Cherfan - Senior; 16 Michael Robertson - Junior; Setters: 2 Cameron Wurl - (redshirt) Sophomore; 3 Bryce Dvorak – Graduate Student; 25 Landon Seymour - Junior

== Schedule ==
Legend
	Tritons win
	Tritons loss
	Postponement
*	Non-Conference Game

2025 UC San Diego Tritons Men's Volleyball Game Log (18-12)
Regular season (17–11)

January (7–1)
Date	TV	Opponent	Rank	Stadium	Score	Sets	Attendance	Overall	BWC
Exhibition - North American Challenge
January 3	-	vs. Calgary*	No. 18	Walter Pyramid; Long Beach, California	3-0	(25–21, 25–11, 25–22)	226	–	–
January 4	-	vs. Saskatchewan*	No. 18	The Gold Mine; Long Beach, California	3-0	(25–23, 25–20, 25–19)	164	–	–
January 4	-	vs. Trinity Western*	No. 18	The Gold Mine	3-0	(25–21, 25–20, 25–16)	–	–	—
January 7	ESPN+	No. 20 McKendree*	No. 18	Liontree Arena; La Jolla, California	3-0	(25-21, 25-22, 25-22)	409	1-0	-
January 8	ESPN+	RV Saint Francis*	No. 18	Liontree Arena	3-0	(25-20, 25-20, 25-16)	259	2-0	-
January 10	ESPN+	Daemen*	No. 18	Liontree Arena	3-0	(25-18, 25-15, 25-20)	306	3-0	-
January 14	ESPN+	No. 18 George Mason*	No. 17	Liontree Arena	3-0	(25-15, 25-18, 25-17)	334	4-0	-
Under Armour Challenge
January 17	-	RV Lindenwood*	No. 17	Premier America Credit Union Arena; Northridge, California	3-1	(25-22, 22-25, 25-22, 25-21)	123	5-0	-
January 18	-	RV Purdue Fort Wayne*	No. 17	Premier America Credit Union Arena	3-0	(25-22, 25-21, 25-18)	115	6-0	-
January 23	-	at No. 3 UCLA*	No. 14	Pauley Pavilion; Los Angeles, California	1-3	(22-25, 14-25, 26-24, 29-31)	942	6-1	-
January 24	ESPN+	Vanguard*	No. 14	Liontree Arena	3-0	(25-13, 25-14, 25-18)	585	7-1	-

February (4–3)
Date	TV	Opponent	Rank	Stadium	Score	Sets	Attendance	Overall	BWC
February 1	ESPN+	No. 7 Loyola*	No. 15	Liontree Arena	2-3	(25-23, 18-25, 25-22, 22-25, 11-15)	748	7-2	-
February 4	ESPN+	No. 19 Lincoln Memorial*	No. 13	Liontree Arena	3-0	(25-20, 25-21, 26-24)	299	8-2	-
February 7	-	at Vanguard*	No. 12	Freed Center; Costa Mesa, California	3-2	(25-19, 25-16, 20-25, 25-27, 15-13)	125	9-2	-
February 14	-	at No. 10 Grand Canyon*	No. 12	Global Credit Union Arena; Phoenix, Arizona	1-3	(23-25, 20-25, 25-12, 24-26)	803	9-3	-
February 15	-	at No. 10 Grand Canyon*	No. 12	Global Credit Union Arena	2-3	(25-20, 21-25, 25-15, 18-25, 17-19)	923	9-4	-
February 22	-	at Concordia*	No. 13	CU Arena; Irvine, California	3-0	(25-22, 25-21, 25-16)	183	10-4	-
February 28	-	at Menlo*	No. 14	Haynes-Prim Pavilion; Atherton, California	3-0	(25-18, 28-26, 25-16)	120	11-4	-

March (5–2)
Date	TV	Opponent	Rank	Stadium	Score	Sets	Attendance	Overall	BWC
March 1	-	at No. 8 Stanford*	No. 14	Maples Pavilion; Stanford, California	3-2	(24-26, 25-22, 22-25, 25-22, 15-11)	894	12-4	-
March 5	ESPN+	Sacred Heart*	No. 13	Liontree Arena	3-0	(25-20, 25-22, 25-22)	393	13-4	-
March 7	ESPN+	at No. 17 UC Santa Barbara	No. 13	The Thunderdome; Santa Barbara, California	3-1	(25-22, 25-17, 20-25, 25-20)	589	14-4	1-0
March 10	ESPN+	No. 19 Princeton*	No. 13	Liontree Arena	3-1	(19-25, 25-23, 25-14, 25-19)	457	15-4	-
March 14	ESPN+	No. 18 UC Santa Barbara	No. 13	Liontree Arena	3-1	(21-25, 25-22, 25-19, 25-22)	478	16-4	2-0

== Rankings ==
Ranking movements Legend: ██ Increase in ranking ██ Decrease in ranking
	Week																	
Poll	Pre	1	2	3	4	5	6	7	8	9	10	11	12	13	14	15	16	Final
AVCA	18	17	14	15	13	12	13	14	13	13	12	11	10	10	10	10	10	10
