= 2019 Conference Carolinas men's volleyball tournament =

2019 Conference Carolinas men's volleyball standings
	Conf.				Overall
Team	W		L	PCT	W		L	PCT
Barton ‍†‍‡‍^{y}	14	–	2	.875	25	–	5	.833
King ‍‍‍	12	–	2	.857	16	–	8	.667
Belmont Abbey ‍‍‍	10	–	6	.625	15	–	11	.577
Mount Olive ‍‍‍	9	–	7	.563	11	–	16	.407
North Greenville ‍‍‍	8	–	7	.533	16	–	12	.571
Limestone ‍‍‍	8	–	8	.500	14	–	13	.519
Emmanuel ‍‍‍	5	–	11	.313	10	–	19	.345
Erskine ‍‍‍	4	–	12	.250	6	–	21	.222
Lees–McRae ‍‍‍	0	–	15	.000	2	–	20	.091
† – Conference champion ‡ – Conference Carolinas tournament champion y – Invited to the NCAA tournament Rankings from AVCA

The 2019 Conference Carolinas men's volleyball tournament was the men's volleyball tournament for Conference Carolinas during the 2019 NCAA Division I & II men's volleyball season. It was held April 13 through April 18, 2019 at campus sites. The winner received the conference's automatic bid to the 2019 NCAA Volleyball Tournament.

== Seeds ==
Eight of the nine teams are eligible for the postseason, with the highest seed hosting each round. Teams are seeded by record within the conference, with a tiebreaker system to seed teams with identical conference records.

Seed	School	Conference	Tiebreaker
1	Barton	14–2	Overall sets won against the league (45 of 56)
2	King	14–2	Overall sets won against the league (45 of 60)
3	Belmont Abbey	10–6	–
4	Mount Olive	9–7	–
5	North Greenville	8–8	Overall sets won against the league (34 of 63)
6	Limestone	8–8	Overall sets won against the league (31 of 60)
7	Emmanuel	5–11	–
8	Erskine	4–12	–
9	Lees-McRae	0–16	Did not qualify

== Schedule and results ==
Time	Matchup	Score	Attendance	Broadcasters
Quarterfinals – Saturday, April 13
2:00 pm Conference Carolinas DN	No. 2 King vs. No. 7 Emmanuel	3–2 (25–19, 25–23, 19–25, 23–25, 17–15)	213	No commentary
4:00 pm Conference Carolinas DN	No. 4 Mount Olive vs. No. 5 Limestone	2–3 (28–26, 25–22, 24–26, 23–25, 13–15)	53	Ethan Swenson & Zach Teeple
6:30 pm Conference Carolinas DN	No. 1 Barton vs. No. 8 Erskine	3–0 (25–13, 25–15, 25–20)	N/A	No commentary
6:30 pm Conference Carolinas DN	No. 3 Belmont Abbey vs. No. 6 North Greenville	1–3 (25–19, 22–25, 22–25, 22–25)	148	Brian Rushing
Semifinals – Wednesday, April 17
5:00 pm Conference Carolinas DN	No. 2 King vs. No. 6 North Greenville	3–0 (25–21, 25–22, 25–19)	100	Kendall Lewis & Jason Patterson
7:30 pm Conference Carolinas DN	No. 1 Barton vs. No. 5 Limestone	3–0 (25–17, 25–16, 25–19)	375	Kendall Lewis & Jason Patterson
Championship – Thursday, April 18
6:30 pm Conference Carolinas DN	No. 1 Barton vs. No. 2 King	3–2 (23–25, 25–22, 25–23, 25–27, 17–15)	450	Kendall Lewis & Jason Patterson
All game times are ET. Rankings denote tournament seeding.

== Bracket ==
Quarterfinals; Saturday, April 13
1	Barton	3
8	Erskine	0
4	Mount Olive	2
5	Limestone	3
(Pairings are reseeded after the first round)
2	King	3
7	Emmanuel	2
3	Belmont Abbey	1
6	North Greenville	3

Semifinals; Wednesday, April 17
1	Barton	3
6	North Greenville	0
2	King	3
5	Limestone	0

Championship; Thursday, April 18
1	Barton	3
2	King	2

The win clinched Barton's second trip to the NCAA Tournament.
