= Nicolas Szerszeń =

French-Polish volleyball player (born 1996)

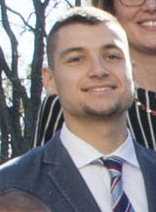
- Szerszeń in 2017

Personal information
- Born: 31 December 1996 (age 29); Paris, France
- Hometown: Poissy, France
- Height: 1.95 m (6 ft 5 in)
- Education: Ohio State University

Volleyball information
- Position: Outside hitter

Career
| Years | Teams |
|---|---|
| 2015–2018 | Ohio State Buckeyes |
| 2018–2019 | Asseco Resovia |
| 2019–2020 | Ślepsk Suwałki |
| 2020–2022 | Asseco Resovia |
| 2022–2023 | LUK Lublin |
| 2023–2025 | AZS Olsztyn |
| 2025–2026 | Jastrzębski Węgiel |

Nicolas Szerszeń (born 31 December 1996) is a French–Polish former professional volleyball player.

In January 2020, Szerszeń changed his sport nationality to Polish.

== Personal life ==
His father, Jacek Szerszeń, was also a volleyball player and played in the top Polish volleyball league as a member of Resovia and Hutnik Kraków.

== Honours ==
=== College ===
- Domestic
  - 2016 NCAA national championship, with Ohio State Buckeyes
  - 2017 NCAA national championship, with Ohio State Buckeyes

=== Individual awards ===
- 2016: NCAA national championship – All-tournament team
- 2017: NCAA national championship – All-tournament team (Most outstanding player)
- 2018: NCAA national championship – All-tournament team

=== Statistics ===
- 2019–20 PlusLiga – Best server (49 aces)
