= TJ DeFalco =

American volleyball player (born 1997)

Torey DeFalco
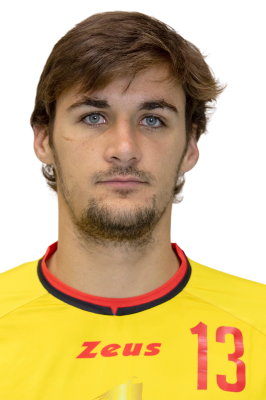
- DeFalco in 2019

Personal information
- Full name: Torey James DeFalco
- Nickname: T.J.
- Born: April 10, 1997 (age 29); Springfield, Missouri, U.S.
- Height: 6 ft 6 in (1.98 m)
- Weight: 209 lb (95 kg)
- Spike: 130 in (340 cm)
- Block: 129 in (328 cm)
- Education: California State University, Long Beach

Volleyball information
- Position: Outside hitter
- Current club: JTEKT Stings

Career
Years	Teams
2016–2019; 2019–2021; 2021–2022; 2022–2024; 2024–	Long Beach State; Volley Callipo; AZS Olsztyn; Asseco Resovia; JTEKT Stings

National team
2015–	United States
Medal record
Men's volleyball
Representing United States
Olympic Games
Bronze medal – third place	2024 Paris	Team
FIVB World Cup
Gold medal – first place	2023 Japan
Bronze medal – third place	2019 Japan
FIVB Nations League
Silver medal – second place	2022 Bologna
Silver medal – second place	2023 Gdańsk
Silver medal – second place	2026 Ningbo
Bronze medal – third place	2018 Lille
NORCECA Championship
Gold medal – first place	2023 Charleston
Silver medal – second place	2019 Winnipeg

Torey James DeFalco (born April 10, 1997) is an American professional volleyball player who plays as an outside hitter for JTEKT Stings and the U.S. national team. DeFalco took home a bronze medal at the Olympic Games Paris 2024.

== Early life ==
DeFalco was raised on a farm in Missouri until the age of nine, when his family moved to California. He attended Huntington Beach High School, where his performance on the volleyball team earned him national attention.

DeFalco is one of seven children. His sister, Teagan, played beach volleyball for the Washington Huskies. She now plays for Vegas Thrill.

== Career ==
=== College ===
Recognized as the top recruit in the country, DeFalco enrolled at California State University, Long Beach, where he majored in Consumer Affairs. While at LBSU, he reached the NCAA Final Four all four years (2016–2019) and won the NCAA Championship twice (2018, 2019). He was a two–time AVCA Player of the Year (2017, 2019), the AVCA Newcomer of the Year (2016), and a four–time AVCA First Team All American (2016–2019). He was named Most Outstanding Player of the 2019 NCAA Championships, as well as being named to the NCAA All–Tournament Team three times (2016, 2018, 2019).

=== Club ===
In June 2019, DeFalco signed his first professional volleyball contract with the Italian team, Volley Callipo. For the 2021–22 season, he joined AZS Olsztyn. For the 2022–23 PlusLiga season, he signed a contract with Resovia.

=== National team ===
DeFalco joined the U.S. National Team in 2015, while he was still in high school. He competed with the national team at the 2020 Tokyo Olympics and the 2024 Paris Olympics.

== Honors ==
=== Club ===
- CEV Cup
  - 2023–24 – with Asseco Resovia

=== College ===
- Domestic
  - 2018 NCAA National Championship, with Long Beach State
  - 2019 NCAA National Championship, with Long Beach State

=== Youth national team ===
- 2014 NORCECA U19 Championship

=== Individual awards ===
- 2014: NORCECA U19 Championship – Most valuable player
- 2014: NORCECA U19 Championship – Best outside hitter
- 2016: NCAA National Championship – All-tournament team
- 2017: AVCA National Player of the Year
- 2018: NCAA National Championship – All-tournament team
- 2019: AVCA National Player of the Year
- 2019: NCAA National Championship – All-tournament team (Most outstanding player)
- 2019: NORCECA Championship – Best outside spiker

=== Statistics ===
- 2021–22 PlusLiga – Best scorer (536 points)
