= 2016 NCAA men's volleyball tournament =

2016 NCAA Men's National Collegiate Volleyball Tournament

Tournament details
- Dates: May 3–7, 2016
- Teams: 6

Final positions
- Champions: Ohio State (2nd title)
- Runners-up: BYU

Tournament statistics
- Matches played: 5

Awards
- Most Outstanding Player: Miles Johnson ^{(Ohio State)}

The 2016 NCAA Men's National Collegiate Volleyball Tournament was the 47th annual tournament to determine the national champion of NCAA Division I and Division II men's collegiate indoor volleyball. The single elimination tournament was played at Rec Hall in University Park, Pennsylvania from May 3–7, 2016.

== Qualification ==
With the creation of the separate NCAA Men's Division III Volleyball Championship in 2012, combined with the completion of the transition of the last Division III institution competing at the National Collegiate level, Rutgers–Newark, to Division III volleyball after the 2014 season, only NCAA men's volleyball programs from Division I and Division II were eligible for this tournament.

For the third straight year, a total of 6 teams were invited:

- Champions of the following conferences:
  - Conference Carolinas
  - Eastern Intercollegiate Volleyball Association
  - Midwestern Intercollegiate Volleyball Association
  - Mountain Pacific Sports Federation
- Two at-large teams

== Tournament bracket ==
- The six teams were seeded according to the same methods used to seed the teams in previous tournaments; the top two seeds received byes into the Final Four, while the third seed faced the sixth seed in the quarterfinals, and likewise the fourth seed faced the fifth seed.
- Two quarterfinal "play-in" matches of the 2016 tournament were held at the Rec Hall on the campus of Penn State University on May 3. (#3 vs. #6 seed; #4 vs. #5 seed)
- The semifinals were held in the Rec Hall on May 5. (#1 vs. #4-#5 winner; #2 vs. #3-#6 winner)
- The 2016 NCAA Championship match was held in the Rec Hall on May 7

Quarterfinals; Tuesday, May 3, 2016; Rec Hall, University Park, PA; College Sports Live
4	Long Beach State (3)	25	27	25
5	Erskine (0)	14	25	20
3	Ohio State (3)	22	25	25	25
6	George Mason (1)	25	21	20	21

Semifinals; Thursday, May 5, 2016; Rec Hall, University Park, PA; NCAA.com
1	BYU (3)	25	23	25	25
4	Long Beach State (1)	21	25	19	18
2	UCLA (2)	25	22	21	25	16
3	Ohio State (3)	22	25	25	20	18

Championship; Saturday, May 7, 2016; Rec Hall, University Park, PA; ESPN2
1	BYU (0)	30	23	17
3	Ohio State (3)	32	25	25

== All-Tournament Team ==
- Jake Arnitz – UCLA
- TJ DeFalco – Long Beach State
- Miles Johnson – Ohio State (Most Outstanding Player)
- Jake Langlois – BYU
- Blake Leeson – Ohio State
- Brenden Sander – BYU
- Nicolas Szerszeń – Ohio State

== Broadcasts ==
Penn State's website carried the first round matches with video and no commentary. NCAA.com carried both national semifinals. ESPN2 carried the national championship. BYU Radio provided national radio coverage of one semifinal and the national championship.

=== TV/Streaming ===
- Semifinals: Ralph Bednarcyzk
- Championship: Paul Sunderland & Kevin Barnett

=== Radio ===
- Jarom Jordan & Rob Neilson (BYU Radio)
