= Simeon Nikolov =

Bulgarian volleyball player (born 2006)

Personal information
- Full name: Simeon Vladimirov Nikolov
- Nickname: Moni
- Nationality: Bulgarian
- Born: 24 November 2006 (age 19) Sofia, Bulgaria
- Education: Long Beach State University
- Height: 2.08 m (6 ft 10 in)
- Weight: 92 kg (203 lb)
- Spike: 363 cm (11 ft 11 in)
- Block: 340 cm (11 ft 2 in)

Volleyball information
- Position: Setter
- Current club: Cucine Lube Civitanova
- Number: 1

Career
- Years: Team
- 2021–2024 2024–2025 2025–2026 2026–: Levski Sofia; Long Beach State; Lokomotiv Novosibirsk; Cucine Lube Civitanova

National team
- Years: Team
- 2022–2023 2022–2024 2023–: Bulgaria U19; Bulgaria U21; Bulgaria
Honours
Men's volleyball
Representing Bulgaria
FIVB World Championship
Silver medal – second place	2025 Philippines

Simeon "Moni" Vladimirov Nikolov (Bulgarian: Симеон Владимиров Николов; born 24 November 2006) is a Bulgarian volleyball player who plays as a setter for Lega Pallavolo Serie A club Cucine Lube Civitanova and the Bulgaria men's national volleyball team. Nikolov won the 2025 AVCA National Player of the Year award during his freshman season at Long Beach State University.

== Personal life ==
He is the son of Vladimir Nikolov, one of the most decorated players in the history of the Bulgarian national volleyball team, and his wife, Maya Nikolova. He has two brothers: an older brother, Aleksandar, who is also a volleyball player and national team teammate, a younger brother, Philip and a younger sister, Daria.

As of 2026, Nikolov is in a relationship with Serbian volleyball player Aleksandra Uzelac.

== Club career ==
During his freshman season at Long Beach State in 2025, Simeon Nikolov quickly established himself as a standout player. He recorded 1,030 assists, averaging 9.60 assists per set, alongside 153 kills and 77 blocks. Nikolov also set a new NCAA single-season record with 106 service aces, averaging nearly one ace per set. With these outstanding statistics he contributed to Long Beach State University, he earned several well-deserved awards, including the AVCA National Player of the Year and Big West Player of the Year. He led Long Beach State into the NCAA Division I Men's Volleyball championship: sweeping UCLA 3–0 in the finals, allowing them to be named as the 2025 NCAA Division I champions. In May 2025, After winning the NCAA championship, he made an announcement in leaving Long Beach State to play professionally overseas in Lokomotiv Novosibirsk of the Russian Super League.

In May 2025, 18‑year‑old setter Simeon Nikolov completed his first professional transfer, departing Long Beach State to join Lokomotiv Novosibirsk of the Russian Super League, where Plamen Konstantinov is the head coach. His initial contract spans one year, with options to extend for up to two additional seasons.

Nikolov stated that Lokomotiv was “the strongest team that wanted me” and expressed confidence in working under Plamen Konstantinov, aiming to develop further in one of the world's most competitive leagues. The decision, he said, was supported by his family, national coach Gianlorenzo Blengini, and the Bulgarian federation, emphasizing his ambition to strengthen the national team by gaining experience at the top level.

Lokomotiv's president and coach highlighted Nikolov's exceptional potential, citing his physical attributes—207 cm height, powerful serve—and expressed plans to integrate him as their primary setter.

== International career ==
In September 2023, at the age of just under 16, Nikolov was called up to the senior Bulgarian national team by Plamen Konstantinov for the intercontinental Olympic qualification tournament for the 2024 Summer Olympics.

In January 2024, during the Balkan qualifiers for the U20 European Championship (BVA), the Bulgarian junior national team won a match against Turkey in which Nikolov scored 18 points—nine of them with service aces, four from blocks, and the remaining five from second-ball attacks and tip shots.

Nikolov participated as the setter for Bulgaria in the 2025 Volleyball Nations League. Throughout the preliminary phase, he scored a total of 28 points—averaging 7.00 points per match. His contributions included 15 attack points (efficiency 45.45%), 5 block points, and 8 serve points (12.90% success).

In the tournament opener on 11 June against Italy, Nikolov contributed 7 points from 3 attacks and 4 serves. He also delivered consistent performances against Argentina, Germany, and Canada.

A highlight came on 13 June, when Bulgaria claimed their first VNL victory in Quebec, defeating Argentina 3–0 (25–21, 25–20, 28–26). In that match, the Nikolov brothers combined for 20 points, with Simeon contributing 6 points, including two consecutive service aces to clinch the win.

== Honours ==
=== College ===
- 2025 NCAA National Championship, with Long Beach State

=== International ===
- 2022 CEV U18 European Championship
- 2022 CEV U20 European Championship
- 2024 CEV U20 European Championship
- 2025 FIVB World Championship

=== Individual ===
- 2022 CEV U18 European Championship - Best setter
- 2023 FIVB U19 World Championship – Best server
- 2024 CEV U20 European Championship – Best setter
- 2024 CEV U20 European Championship – Best server
- 2025 NCAA National Championship – Most valuable player
