= Long Beach State Beach men's volleyball =

American college volleyball team

Long Beach State Beach men's volleyball team
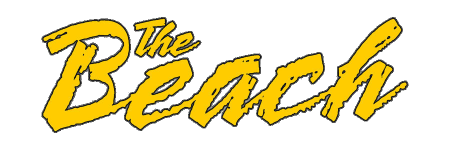
- University: Long Beach State University
- Head coach: Nick MacRae (1st season)
- Conference: Big West
- Location: Long Beach, California, US
- Home arena: LBS Financial Credit Union Pyramid (capacity: 4,200)
- Nickname: The Beach
- Colors: Black and Gold

NCAA tournament champion
- 1991, 2018, 2019, 2025

NCAA tournament runner-up
- 1970, 1973, 1990, 1999, 2004, 2022, 2024

NCAA tournament semifinal
- 1970, 1973, 1990, 1991, 1999, 2004, 2008, 2016, 2017, 2018, 2019, 2022, 2023, 2024, 2025, 2026

NCAA tournament appearance
- 1970, 1973, 1990, 1991, 1999, 2004, 2008, 2016, 2017, 2018, 2019, 2022, 2023, 2024, 2025, 2026

Conference tournament champion
- SCIVA: 1973 WIVA: 1990, 1991 MPSF: 2017; Big West: 2018, 2024, 2026

Conference regular season champion
- SCIVA: 1973; WIVA: 1990, 1992; MPSF: 1999, 2000, 2001, 2008, 2017; Big West: 2018, 2019, 2022, 2023*, 2024, 2025
- * Co-Champion

The Long Beach State Beach men's volleyball team team is the NCAA Division I men's volleyball team for Long Beach State University.

== Program record ==
Year	Head Coach	Overall record	Conference record	Conference standing	Postseason
(SCIVA) (1970–1978)
1970	Randy Sandefur	6–4	3–2	3rd	NCAA Runner-up
1971	Randy Sandefur	5–4	2–3	4th	NCAA Regionals
1972	Randy Sandefur	6–8	2–4	5th	NCAA Regionals
1973	Ray Sandefur	15–3	9–2	1st	NCAA Runner-up
1974	Randy Sandefur	3–10	3–10	6th	
1975	Miles Pabst	2–10	2–10	6th	
1976	Miles Pabst	5–7	5–7	5th	
1977	Dick Montgomery	4–10	4–10	6th	
1978	Dick Montgomery	13–6	9–5	4th	NCAA Regionals
(CIVA) (1979–1985)
1979	Dick Montgomery	14–9	9–9	6th	
1980	Dick Montgomery	21–7	13–5	4th	
1981	Don Paris	15–13	9–7	4th	NCAA Regionals
1982	Ray Ratelle	15–15	4–12	7th	NCAA Regionals
1983	Ray Ratelle	20–9	11–5	2nd	NCAA Regionals
1984	Ray Ratelle	15–10	10–8	5th	NCAA Regionals
1985	Ray Ratelle	14–19	3–15	9th	
(WIVA) (1986–1992)
1986	Ray Ratelle	19–15	7–13	7th	
1987	Ray Ratelle	18–15	5–13	7th	
1988	Ray Ratelle	20–14	8–10	6th	
1989	Ray Ratelle	22–9	12–8	6th	
1990	Ray Ratelle	28–7	14–2	1st	NCAA Runner-up
1991	Ray Ratelle	31–4	14–2	2nd	NCAA Champion
1992	Ray Ratelle	27–4	15–1	1st	
(MPSF) (1993–2017)
1993	Ray Ratelle	18–13	12–7	2nd	
1994	Ray Ratelle	13–15	7–12	5th	
1995	Ray Ratelle	18–9	12–7	3rd	
1996	Ray Ratelle	21–6	15–4	2nd	
1997	Ray Ratelle	19–10	12–7	2nd	
1998	Ray Ratelle	22–7	13–6	2nd	
1999	Ray Ratelle	22–4	17–2	1st	NCAA Runner-up
2000	Ray Ratelle	23–5	16–3	1st	
2001	Alan Knipe	18–7	12–5	1st	
2002	Alan Knipe	13–18	9–13	7th	
2003	Alan Knipe	17–13	11–11	8th	
2004	Alan Knipe	28–7	18–4	2nd	NCAA Runner-up
2005	Alan Knipe	22–10	14–8	5th	
2006	Alan Knipe	22–10	14–8	4th	
2007	Alan Knipe	11–17	6–16	10th	
2008	Alan Knipe	23–7	18–4	1st	NCAA Semifinals
2009	Alan Knipe	14–14	11–11	7th	
2010	Andy Read †	12–17	8–14	10th	
2011	Andy Read †	15–14	12–10	6th	
2012	Andy Read †	15–15	10–12	6th	
2013	Alan Knipe	24–8	18–6	T-2nd	
2014	Alan Knipe	18–10	15–9	T-4th	
2015	Alan Knipe	15–13	11–11	7th	
2016	Alan Knipe	25–8	17–5	T-2nd	NCAA Semifinals
2017	Alan Knipe	24–7	16–2	1st	NCAA Semifinals
(Big West) (2018–present)
2018	Alan Knipe	28–1	9–1	1st	NCAA Champions
2019	Alan Knipe	28–2	10–0	1st	NCAA Champions
2020	Alan Knipe	10–1	COVID	–	–
2021	Alan Knipe	7–5	6–4	3rd	
2022	Alan Knipe	21–6	8–2	1st	NCAA Runner-up
2023	Alan Knipe	20–4	9–1	T-1st	NCAA Semifinals
2024	Alan Knipe	27–3	9–1	1st	NCAA Runner-up
2025	Alan Knipe	30–3	8–2	1st	NCAA Champions
2026	Nick MacRae	25–5	8–2	2nd	NCAA Semifinals
Total:		936–485 (.659)	529–358 (.596)		
National champion Postseason invitational champion Conference regular season champion Conference regular season and conference tournament champion Division regular season champion Division regular season and conference tournament champion Conference tournament champion

== History ==
=== Head coaches ===
- 1970–1974: Randy Sandefur
- 1975–1976: Miles Pabst
- 1977–1980: Dick Montgomery
- 1981: Don Paris
- 1982–2000: Ray Ratelle

Ray Ratelle was the Head Coach for 19 seasons with an overall win–loss record of 385-190 (.670) and conference record of 207-137 (.602), with 3 Conference titles and 3 NCAA appearances. 1990 NCAA Finalist and in his tenth year, won the first ever Men's NCAA Championship team title of any sport in Long Beach State's history of athletics. Ratelle was also named Coach of the Year in both 1990 and 1991.

- 2001–2009: Alan Knipe
- 2010–2012: Andy Read †
- 2013–2025: Alan Knipe

Alan Knipe's win–loss record as of the 2025 regular season stands at 446–171 (.723). Knipe has been to the Semifinals twice as a player (1990, 1991) and ten as Head Coach (2004, 2008, 2016, 2017, 2018, 2019, 2022, 2023, 2024, 2025). He was a member of Long Beach's 1991 NCAA Men's Volleyball National Championship Team; he has coached the Beach to three NCAA Championships (2018, 2019 and 2025). He was the Head Coach of the U.S. Men's National Team (2009 - 2012) and he returned to LBSU upon completing his service.

Under Knipe, Scott Touzinsky was a Long Beach State assistant coach. Touzinsky was suspended by USA Volleyball in July 2018 because of a pending investigations by the United States Center for SafeSport. Since the NCAA doesn’t fall under SafeSport jurisdiction, Touzinsky wasn’t prohibited from coaching in college. The complaint against Touzinsky related to when Touzinsky was a player on the USA National Team. Touzinsky left the program in April 2019 after it was revealed he was sanctioned by the SafeSport following an investigation into allegations of sexual misconduct.

- 2026: Nick MacRae

† Interim Head Coach

=== Conference ===
- 1970–1978: SCIVA
  - Overall Record (incomplete): 50–56 (.472)
- 1979–1985: CIVA
  - Overall Record: 114–82 (.582)
- 1986–1992: WIVA
  - Overall Record: 165–68 (.708)
- 1993–2017: Mountain Pacific Sports Federation (MPSF)
  - Overall Record: 341–199 (.631)
- 2018–present: Big West Conference
  - Overall Record: 67–13 (.838)

=== Home court ===
The volleyball team played in the Goldmine gymnasium at CSULB until 1994. Since November 30, 1994, the team has played at the LBS Financial Credit Union Pyramid. The 18-story tall complex has played host four times to the NCAA Men's Volleyball Championships (2001, 2003, 2019, 2024). Its infrastructure utilizes 18,000 steel tubes and connection modules. It cost approximately $22 million to build.

=== National championships ===
1991: First NCAA title by defeating USC 3–1 at Neal S. Blaisell Center in Honolulu, HI (Hosted by Hawai'i). Long Beach defeated Penn State 3–0 in the semi-finals.

- With an overall record of 31–4 (.886) and won the WIVA Conference Tournament Championship. The team included First Team All-American (Brent Hilliard, Brett Winslow) Second Team All-American (Alan Knipe). NCAA Championship All-Tournament Team (Brent Hilliard, Brett Winslow, Alan Knipe, Jason Stimpfig, Matt Lyles). NCAA Championship Tournament MVP (Brent Hilliard). Ray Ratelel was named VollyeBall Magazine & AVCA Coach of the Year.

2018: Second NCAA title by defeating UCLA 3–2 at Pauley Pavilion in Los Angeles, CA (Hosted by UCLA). They defeated Ohio State University 3–1 in the semi-finals.

- With two AVCA National Players of the Year, Josh Tunaniga (2018) and TJ DeFalco (2017), eight thousand spectators were treated to a thrilling five-set match. The team finished with an overall record of 28–1 (.966) and won the Big West Regular Season and Big West Tournament Championships. First Team All-American (TJ DeFalco, Kyle Ending, Josh Tuaniga), Second Team All-American (Nick Amado), Honorable Mention All-American (Simon Anderson). NCAA Championship All-Tournament Team (TJ DeFalco, Kyle Ensing, Josh Tuaniga), NCAA Championship Tournament MVP (Josh Tuaniga). Alan Knipe also was named the AVCA & Big West Coach of the Year.

2019: Third NCAA title by defeating Hawaii 3–1 at the Walter Pryamid in Long Beach, CA (Hosted by Long Beach State). Long Beach defeated Pepperdine University 3–1 in the semi-finals.

- For the first time in school history winning back-to-back National Championships. The team finished with an overall record of 28–2 (.933) and won the Big West Regular Season Championship. The team included AVCA Player of they Year (TJ DeFalco). First Team All-American (TJ DeFalco, Kyle Ending, Josh Tuaniga). Second Team All-American (Nick Amado). NCAA Championship All-Tournament Team (TJ DeFalco, Nick Amado, Simon Anderson, Josh Tuaniga), NCAA Championship Tournament MVP (TJ DeFalco). Alan Knipe was named the Big West Coach of the Year.

2025: Fourth NCAA title by defeating UCLA 3–0 at the Covelli Center in Columbus, Ohio (Hosted by Ohio State). Long Beach State defeated Pepperdine University 3–1 in the semi-finals.

- The team finished with an overall record of 30–3 (.909), winning the Big West Regular Season Championshiop. The team included AVCA Player of they Year (Moni Nikolov). First Team All-American (Moni Nikolov, Skylar Varga). Second Team All-American (DiAeris McRaven). Honorable Mention All-American (Daniil Hershtynovich, Kellen Larson). NCAA Championship All-Tournament Team (Moni Nikolov, Skylar Varga, Alex Kandev), NCAA Championship Tournament MVP (Moni Nikolov).

== Notable players ==
=== Alumni ===
- Bob Ctvrtlik (1983) – All-American Honorable Mention 1983, U.S. National Team Member (1985–1996). Olympian in 1988, 1992, 1996. 1988 Olympic Gold Medalist. 1992 Olympic Bronze Medalist. FIVB Best Player in the World 1995.
- Brett Winslow (1988–1991) – NCAA Champion 1991. 2x First Team All-American 1990, 1991. NCAA All-Tournament Team 1991. U.S. National Team Member (1992–1999). 1996 U.S. Olympian. Winslow's #15 jersey is retired and hanging in the LBS Financial Credit Union Pyramid.
- Alan Knipe (1990–1992) – 2x All-American (First Team 1992, Second Team 1991). 3x AVCA Coach of the Year (2004, 2017, 2018); U.S. National Team Coach (2009–2012), 2x MPSF Coach of the Year (2008, 2017), 3x Big West Coach of the Year (2018, 2019, 2024). 4x NCAA Champion, as a player in 1991 and as head coach in 2018, 2019 and 2025.
- Brent Hilliard (1990–1993) – AVCA National Player of the Year 1992. NCAA Champion 1991. 4x All-American (First Team 1991,1992,1993; Honorable Mention 1990). NCAA All-Tournament Team 1990,1991. NCAA Tournament MVP 1991. All First Team MPSF 15th Year Anniversary Team. U.S. National Team Member (1991–1995). 1992 Olympic Bronze Medalist. Hilliard's #7 jersey is retired and hanging in the LBS Financial Credit Union Pyramid.
- Tom Hoff (1994–1996) – 2x First Team All-American 1995, 1996. 3x U.S. Olympian (2000, 2004, 2008). 2008 Olympic Gold Medalist. All Second-Team MPSF 15th Year Anniversary Team. NCAA triple-doubles leader (K-B-D). Hoff's #9 jersey is retired and hanging in the LBS Financial Credit Union Pyramid.
- David Lee (2001–2004) – First Team All-American 2004. U.S. National Team Member (2003–2016). Olympian in 2008, 2012, 2016. 2008 Olympic Gold Medalist.
- Scott Touzinsky (2001–2004) – MPSF Co-Freshman of the Year 2001, First Team All-American 2004, NCAA All-Tournament Team 2004, U.S. National Team Member (2007–2018). 2008 Olympic Gold Medalist.
- Paul Lotman (2005–2008) – First Team All-American & AVCA Co-National Player of the Year 2008. U.S. National Team Member (2008–2016). Olympian in 2012. Current member of the AVP Tour. Lotman's #2 jersey was retired during the 2026 season and is hanging in the LBS Financial Credit Union Pyramid.
- Taylor Crabb (2011–2014) – AVCA Player of the Year 2013. 3x All-American (First Team 2013, 2014; Third Team 2012). Olympian in 2020 in Beach Volleyball. Current member of AVP Tour.
- Kyle Ensing (2016–2019) – 2x NCAA Champion 2018, 2019. 3x All-American (First Team 2018, 2019; Second Team 2017). Big West Player of the Year 2019. NCAA All-Tournament Team 2018. U.S. National Team Member (2019-Present). Olympian in 2020 and as an alternate in 2024.
- Josh Tuaniga (2016–2019) – 2x NCAA Champion 2018, 2019. AVCA Player of the Year 2018. 4x All-American (First Team 2017, 2018, 2019; Second Team 2016). NCAA Tournament MVP 2018. 2x NCAA All-Tournament Team 2018, 2019. U.S. National Team Member (2019-Present). Named an alternate for Olympics in 2020.
- TJ DeFalco (2016–2019) – 2x NCAA Champion 2018, 2019. 2x AVCA Player of the Year 2017, 2019. 4x First Team All-American (2016–2019). NCAA Tournament MVP 2019. 3x NCAA All-Tournament Team (2016, 2018, 2019). U.S. National Team member (2019-Present). Olympian in 2020 and bronze medalist in 2024.
- Aleksander Nikolov (2022) – First ever men's true freshman to be named AVCA Player of the Year 2022. First Team All-American 2022. NCAA All-Tournament Team 2022. Bulgarian National Team Member (2022-Present).
- Moni Nikolov (2025) – NCAA Champion 2025. Second ever men's true freshman to be named AVCA Player of the Year 2025, following his older brother's foot steps. First Team All-American 2025. NCAA Tournament MVP 2025. NCAA All-Tournament Team 2025. He set the NCAA single-season record with 106 service aces. Bulgarian National Team Member (2023-Present).
