= Hawaii Rainbow Warriors volleyball =

American college volleyball program

Hawaii Rainbow Warriors Volleyball
- University: University of Hawaiʻi at Mānoa
- Athletic director: Matt Elliott
- Head coach: Charlie Wade (17th season)
- Conference: Big West
- Location: Honolulu, Hawaii, US
- Home arena: Stan Sheriff Center (capacity: 10,300)
- Nickname: Rainbow Warriors
- Colors: Green, black, silver, and white

NCAA tournament champion
- 2002†, 2021, 2022, 2026

NCAA tournament runner-up
- 1996, 2019, 2023

NCAA tournament semifinal
- 1995, 1996, 2002†, 2017, 2019, 2021, 2022, 2023, 2025, 2026

NCAA tournament appearance
- 1995, 1996, 2002†, 2015, 2017, 2019, 2021, 2022, 2023, 2025, 2026

Conference tournament champion
- Big West: 2019, 2022, 2023, 2025

Conference regular season champion
- Big West: 2021, 2023*, 2026

Conference division champion
- MPSF: 1995, 1996, 1998, 2001
- * Co-Champion † Vacated by NCAA

The Hawaii Rainbow Warriors volleyball team represents the University of Hawaiʻi at Mānoa in NCAA men's competition. The team currently competes in the Big West Conference after leaving its longtime home of the Mountain Pacific Sports Federation in 2018. The Rainbow Warriors are currently coached by Charlie Wade.

== Year-by-year results ==
Record table
| Season | Coach | Overall | Conference | Standing | Postseason |
|---|---|---|---|---|---|
Dave Shoji (1979–1980)
| 1979 | Dave Shoji | 5–2 | | | |
| 1980 | Dave Shoji | 13–2 | 10–0 | 1st | |
Dave Shoji (California Intercollegiate Volleyball Association) (1981–1984)
| 1981 | Dave Shoji | 12–9 | 8–8 | 5th | |
| 1982 | Dave Shoji | 14–8 | 9–7 | T–4th | |
| 1983 | Dave Shoji | 12–7 | 10–6 | T–4th | |
| 1984 | Dave Shoji | 11–9 | 9–9 | T–6th | |
| Dave Shoji: | | 67–37 (.644) | 46–30 (.605) | | |
Dave Shoji/Jim Smoot (California Intercollegiate Volleyball Association) (1985)
| 1985 | Dave Shoji/Jim Smoot (Note: Shoji and Smoot served as co-coaches.) | 14–11 | 9–9 | 6th | |
| Dave Shoji/Jim Smoot: | | 14–11 (.560) | 9–9 (.500) | | |
Alan Rosehill (California Intercollegiate Volleyball Association) (1986)
| 1986 | Alan Rosehill | 15–6 | 15–5 | T–2nd | |
Alan Rosehill (Western Intercollegiate Volleyball Association) (1987–1992)
| 1987 | Alan Rosehill | 8–10 | 8–10 | 6th | |
| 1988 | Alan Rosehill | 25–5 | 15–3 | 2nd | |
| 1989 | Alan Rosehill | 22–7 | 15–5 | 3rd | |
| 1990 | Alan Rosehill | 18–9 | 12–4 | T–2nd (Wilson) | |
| 1991 | Alan Rosehill | 7–17 | 3–13 | 6th (Wilson) | |
| 1992 | Alan Rosehill | 13–14 | 7–9 | 4th (Wilson) | |
| Alan Rosehill: | | 108–68 (.614) | 75–49 (.605) | | |
Mike Wilton (Mountain Pacific Sports Federation) (1993–2009)
| 1993 | Mike Wilton | 18–10 | 10–9 | 5th (Pacific) | |
| 1994 | Mike Wilton | 14–14 | 10–9 | T–3rd (Pacific) | |
| 1995 | Mike Wilton | 19–8 | 15–4 | 1st (Pacific) | NCAA Semifinals |
| 1996 | Mike Wilton | 27–3 | 19–0 | 1st (Pacific) | NCAA Runner-Up |
| 1997 | Mike Wilton | 18–11 | 10–9 | 3rd (Pacific) | |
| 1998 | Mike Wilton | 23–6 | 16–3 | 1st (Pacific) | |
| 1999 | Mike Wilton | 19–10 | 11–8 | 2nd (Pacific) | |
| 2000 | Mike Wilton | 19–10 | 13–6 | 3rd (Pacific) | |
| 2001 | Mike Wilton | 19–7 | 12–5 | T–1st (Pacific) | |
| 2002 | Mike Wilton | 24–8 | 17–5 | 2nd (Pacific) | NCAA Champion (vacated) (Note: National championship was vacated due to an ineligible player.) |
| 2003 | Mike Wilton | 24–6 | 17–5 | 2nd (Pacific) | |
| 2004 | Mike Wilton | 17–12 | 13–9 | 6th | |
| 2005 | Mike Wilton | 19–9 | 15–7 | 4th | |
| 2006 | Mike Wilton | 23–5 | 19–3 | 2nd | |
| 2007 | Mike Wilton | 13–14 | 11–11 | T–6th | |
| 2008 | Mike Wilton | 11–16 | 8–14 | 9th | |
| 2009 | Mike Wilton | 9–18 | 6–16 | 10th | |
| Mike Wilton: | | 316–167 (.654) | 222–123 (.643) | | |
Charlie Wade (Mountain Pacific Sports Federation) (2010–2017)
| 2010 | Charlie Wade | 19–10 | 14–8 | 4th | |
| 2011 | Charlie Wade | 15–13 | 13–9 | 5th | |
| 2012 | Charlie Wade | 7–20 | 4–18 | 12th | |
| 2013 | Charlie Wade | 11–17 | 10–14 | 9th | |
| 2014 | Charlie Wade | 15–12 | 13–11 | 9th | |
| 2015 | Charlie Wade | 24–7 | 18–4 | 2nd | NCAA Quarterfinals |
| 2016 | Charlie Wade | 16–12 | 11–11 | 7th | |
| 2017 | Charlie Wade | 27–6 | 14–4 | 3rd | NCAA Semifinals |
Charlie Wade (Big West Conference) (2018–present)
| 2018 | Charlie Wade | 19–8 | 6–4 | T–2nd | |
| 2019 | Charlie Wade | 28–3 | 8–2 | 2nd | NCAA Runner-Up |
| 2020 | Charlie Wade | 15–1 (Note: Season not played past March 6 due to COVID-19 pandemic.) | | | |
| 2021 | Charlie Wade | 17–1 | 10–0 | 1st | NCAA Champion |
| 2022 | Charlie Wade | 27–5 | 7–3 | 2nd | NCAA Champion |
| 2023 | Charlie Wade | 29–3 | 9–1 | T-1st | NCAA Runner-Up |
| 2024 | Charlie Wade | 23–7 | 5–5 | 3rd | |
| 2025 | Charlie Wade | 27-6 | 7–3 | 2nd | NCAA Semifinals |
| 2026 | Charlie Wade | 30–5 | 9–1 | 1st | NCAA Champion |
| Charlie Wade: | | 349-136 (.720) | 158–98 (.617) | | |
| Total: | | 851–419 (.670) | | | |
National champion Postseason invitational champion Conference regular season champion Conference regular season and conference tournament champion Division regular season champion Division regular season and conference tournament champion Conference tournament champion

== Home court ==
The Rainbow Warriors have played their home games at the Stan Sheriff Center since 1995, and have had 13 sellouts of their games, the most recent being back to back sellouts April 11 & 12, 2025 against Long Beach State men's volleyball.

Since joining the MPSF, and later, the Big West, Hawaii has consistently been one of the leaders in the country in home attendance. Under Charlie Wade, the Rainbow Warriors are nearly unbeatable at the Stan Sheriff Center, averaging over 12 home wins a season. They also have posted three undefeated home seasons in the last five years, most recently in 2022.

== See also ==
- List of NCAA men's volleyball programs
