= 2025 NCAA men's volleyball tournament =

Men's college volleyball tournament

Tournament details
- Dates: May 2–12, 2025
- Teams: 9

Final positions
- Champions: Long Beach State (4th title)
- Runners-up: UCLA

Tournament statistics
- Matches played: 8
- Attendance: 19,199 (2,400 per match)

Awards
- Most Outstanding Player: Moni Nikolov ^{(Long Beach State)}

The 2025 NCAA men's volleyball tournament was the 54th edition of the NCAA men's volleyball tournament, an annual tournament to determine the national champion of NCAA Division I and Division II men's collegiate indoor volleyball. The single-elimination tournament, which was expanded to nine teams with the addition of an automatic bid for the Northeast Conference (NEC), begins with an opening round match.

The opening round game was hosted at Penn State's Rec Hall on May 2, 2025, while the rest of the tournament was hosted by Ohio State University from May 8–12, 2025, at Covelli Center in Columbus, Ohio. The opening round, quarterfinals, and semifinals were live on ESPN+, and the National Championship was live on ESPN2 on May 12, 2025, with ESPN+ simulcasting it.

Ultimately the Long Beach State Beach won their fourth title, beating UCLA in three straight sets. This is the Beach's first title since their back-to-back wins in 2018 and 2019. This is the second year in a row that a team receiving an at-large won the title.

== Bids ==
The selection show aired live on April 27, 2025 at 4 p.m. ET on NCAA.com.

School	Conference	Record	Berth	Source
Hawai'i	Big West	26–5	Tournament champion	
Belmont Abbey	Conference Carolinas	17–8	Tournament champion	
Penn State	EIVA	14–15	Tournament champion	
Loyola Chicago	MIVA	25–3	Tournament champion	
Pepperdine	MPSF	20–9	Tournament champion	
Daemen	NEC	15–12	Tournament champion	
Fort Valley State	SIAC	18–9	Tournament champion	
Long Beach State	Big West	27–3	At-large	
UCLA	MPSF	20–6	At-large	

== Bracket ==
Opening Round; Friday, May 2 ESPN+
9	Daemen	0
7	Penn State	3

Quarterfinals; Thursday, May 8 ESPN+
2	Hawai'i	3
7	Penn State	1
3	UCLA	3
6	Belmont Abbey	0
4	Loyola Chicago	1
5	Pepperdine	3
1	Long Beach State	3
8	Fort Valley State	0

Semifinals; Saturday, May 10; ESPN+
2	Hawai'i	0
3	UCLA	3
5	Pepperdine	1
1	Long Beach State	3

National Championship; Monday, May 12; ESPN2, ESPN+ (SAP)
3	UCLA	0
1	Long Beach State	3

== Schedule and results ==
All times Eastern..
All matches except the championship were streamed on ESPN+. The championship was televised on ESPN2.

Match	Time	Matchup	Score	Attendance	Broadcasters	Referees
Opening Round – Friday, May 2
1	7:00 p.m.	Penn State at Daemen	3–0 (23–25, 21–25, 22–25)	400	Ryan Maxwell & Rick Albano	Kurt Fulmer, Bill Wolf, Kristen Hanula, Joshua Galasso
Quarterfinals – Thursday, May 8
2	11:00 a.m.	UCLA vs. Belmont Abbey	3–0 (25–18, 25–21, 25–19)	2,263	Luke Williams & Gabe Eaker	Stephen Shepherd, Joe Gustafson, Dan Swensen, Anthony Hines
3	1:30 p.m.	Hawai'i vs. Penn State	3–1 (25–19, 21–25, 25–23, 25–23)	2,263	Luke Williams & Gabe Eaker	
4	5:00 p.m.	Long Beach State vs. Fort Valley State	3–0 (25–21, 25–16, 25–16)	2,263	Luke Williams & Gabe Eaker	
5	7:30 p.m.	Loyola Chicago vs. Pepperdine	1–3 (25–18, 26–28, 13–25, 20-25)	2,263	Luke Williams & Gabe Eaker	
Semifinals – Saturday, May 10
6	5:00 p.m.	Long Beach State vs. Pepperdine	3–1 (20–25, 25–23, 25–19, 25–23)	3,342	Gabe Eaker & Hanna Williford	
7	8:00 p.m.	Hawai'i vs. UCLA	0–3 (14–25, 23–25, 23–25)	3,342	Gabe Eaker & Hanna Williford	Sergio Gonzalez, Joe Gustafson, Dan Swensen, Anthony Hines
National Championship – Monday, May 12
8	7:00 p.m.	Long Beach State vs. UCLA	3–0 (25–17, 25–23, 25–21)	3,063	Paul Sunderland & Kevin Barnett (ESPN2); Cristina Millán & Paulina García Robles (ESPN+ SAP)	Sergio Gonzalez, Joe Gustafson, Dan Swensen, Anthony Hines

== All Tournament Team ==
- Finn Kearney, Hawai'i
- Ryan Barnett, Pepperdine
- Zach Rama, UCLA
- Cooper Robinson, UCLA
- Alex Kandev, Long Beach State
- Skyler Varga, Long Beach State
- Moni Nikolov, Long Beach State (Most Outstanding Player)
