= 2019 NCAA men's volleyball tournament =

Men's college volleyball tournament

2019 NCAA Men's National Collegiate Volleyball Tournament

Tournament details
- Dates: April 25–May 4, 2019
- Teams: 7

Final positions
- Champions: Long Beach State (3rd title)
- Runners-up: Hawai'i

Tournament statistics
- Matches played: 6
- Attendance: 10,040 (1,673 per match)

Awards
- Most Outstanding Player: TJ DeFalco ^{(Long Beach State)}

The 2019 NCAA Men's National Collegiate Volleyball Tournament was the 50th annual tournament to determine the national champion of NCAA Division I and Division II men's collegiate indoor volleyball. The single-elimination tournament began on April 25 with a play-in match, with the remainder of the tournament hosted by Long Beach State University from April 30 to May 4 at Walter Pyramid in Long Beach.

== Bids ==
School	Conference	Record	Berth	Source
Hawai'i	Big West	27–2	Tournament champion	
Long Beach State	Big West	26–2	At-large	
Pepperdine	MPSF	22–6	Tournament champion	
USC	MPSF	18–10	At-large	
Lewis	MIVA	25–5	Tournament champion	
Barton	Conference Carolinas	25–4	Tournament champion	
Princeton	EIVA	17–12	Tournament champion	

== Tournament bracket ==
Opening Round; Thursday, April 25th
6	Barton	1
7	Princeton	3

Quarterfinals; Tuesday, April 30th
4	USC	1
5	Lewis	3
3	Pepperdine	3
7	Princeton	2

Semifinals; Thursday, May 2nd, NCAA.com
1	Hawai'i	3
5	Lewis	1
2	Long Beach State	3
3	Pepperdine	1

National Championship; Saturday, May 4th ESPN2
1	Hawai'i	1
2	Long Beach State	3

== Schedule and results ==
All times Eastern.

Time	Matchup	Score	Attendance	Broadcasters	Source
Opening Round – Thursday, April 25
7:00 p.m.	Barton vs. Princeton	1–3 (23–25, 21–25, 25–18, 20–25)	575	Kendall Lewis (Conference Carolinas DN)	
Quarterfinals – Tuesday, April 30
8:00 p.m.	USC vs. Lewis	1–3 (25–20, 18–25, 19–25, 23–25)	886	Matt Brown & Bryan Fenley (Big West TV)	
10:30 p.m.	Pepperdine vs. Princeton	3–2 (25–23, 19–25, 25–16, 22–25, 15–8)	977	Matt Brown & Bryan Fenley (Big West TV)	
Semifinals – Thursday, May 2
8:00 p.m.	Hawai'i vs. Lewis	3–1 (25–15, 25–17, 30–32, 25–16)		Lincoln Rose (NCAA.com)	
10:30 p.m.	Long Beach State vs. Pepperdine	3–1 (25–21, 21–25, 25-16, 25–15)	3,778	Lincoln Rose (NCAA.com)	
National Championship – Saturday, May 4
8:00 p.m.	Hawai'i vs. Long Beach State	1–3 (25–23, 22–25, 22–25, 23–25)	3,824	Paul Sunderland & Kevin Barnett (ESPN2)	

== Game summaries ==
All times Eastern.

=== Opening Round ===
April 25, 2019; 7:00 p.m.	Barton	1–3	Princeton	Wilson Gymnasium — Wilson, North Carolina; Attendance: 575; Referees: James McDonald, Bonnie O'Connor
April 25, 2019; 7:00 p.m.	(23–25, 21–25, 25–18, 20–25); Report			Wilson Gymnasium — Wilson, North Carolina; Attendance: 575; Referees: James McDonald, Bonnie O'Connor

=== Quarterfinals ===
April 30, 2019; 8:00 p.m.	USC	1–3	Lewis	Walter Pyramid — Long Beach, California; Attendance: 886; Referees: Bill Wolf, Jesse Martinez
April 30, 2019; 8:00 p.m.	(25–20, 18–25, 19–25, 23–25); Report			Walter Pyramid — Long Beach, California; Attendance: 886; Referees: Bill Wolf, Jesse Martinez

April 30, 2019; 10:30 p.m.	Pepperdine	3–2	Princeton	Walter Pyramid — Long Beach, California; Attendance: 977; Referees: Pati Rolf, Jesse Martinez
April 30, 2019; 10:30 p.m.	(25–23, 19–25, 25–16, 22–25, 15–8); Report			Walter Pyramid — Long Beach, California; Attendance: 977; Referees: Pati Rolf, Jesse Martinez

=== Semifinals ===
May 2, 2019; 8:00 p.m.	Hawai'i	3–1	Lewis	Walter Pyramid — Long Beach, California; Referees: Bill Wolf, Jesse Martinez
May 2, 2019; 8:00 p.m.	(25–15, 25–17, 30–32, 25–16); Report			Walter Pyramid — Long Beach, California; Referees: Bill Wolf, Jesse Martinez

May 2, 2019; 10:30 p.m.	Long Beach State	3–1	Pepperdine	Walter Pyramid — Long Beach, California; Attendance: 3,778; Referees: Jesse Martinez, Pati Rolf
May 2, 2019; 10:30 p.m.	(25–21, 21–25, 25–16, 25–15); Report			Walter Pyramid — Long Beach, California; Attendance: 3,778; Referees: Jesse Martinez, Pati Rolf

=== National Championship ===
May 4, 2019; 8:00 p.m.	Hawai'i	1–3	Long Beach State	Walter Pyramid — Long Beach, California; Attendance: 3,824; Referees: Pati Rolf, Bill Wolf
May 4, 2019; 8:00 p.m.	(25–23, 22–25, 22–25, 23–25); Report			Walter Pyramid — Long Beach, California; Attendance: 3,824; Referees: Pati Rolf, Bill Wolf

== All-Tournament Team ==
- Nick Amado – Long Beach State
- Simon Andersen – Long Beach State
- Colton Cowell – Hawaii
- TJ DeFalco – Long Beach State (Most Outstanding Player)
- Joe Worsley – Hawaii
- Rado Parapunov – Hawaii
- Josh Tuaniga – Long Beach State
