= 2023 Lewis Flyers men's volleyball team =

American college volleyball season

2023 Lewis Flyers men's volleyball
- Conference: Midwestern Intercollegiate Volleyball Association
- Record: 17–12 (7–7 MIVA)
- Head coach: Dan Friend (19th season)
- Assistant coaches: Jacob Kerschner (3rd season); Keith Iverson (5th season)
- Home arena: Neil Carey Arena

The 2023 Lewis Flyers men's volleyball team represented Lewis University in the 2023 NCAA Division I & II men's volleyball season. The Flyers, led by nineteenth year head coach Dan Friend, played their home games at Neil Carey Arena. The Flyers were members of the Midwestern Intercollegiate Volleyball Association and were picked to finish fourth the MIVA in the preseason poll.

2023 Midwestern Intercollegiate Volleyball Association standings
| | Conf. | | | | Overall |
| Team | W | | L | PCT | W | | L | PCT |
|---|---|---|---|---|---|---|---|---|
| No. 13 Loyola Chicago ‍†‍‍ | 11 | – | 3 | .786 | 21 | – | 7 | .750 |
| No. 11 Ball State ‍†‍‍ | 11 | – | 3 | .786 | 20 | – | 9 | .690 |
| No. 7 Ohio State ‍†‍‡‍^{y} | 11 | – | 3 | .786 | 23 | – | 10 | .697 |
| Lewis ‍‍‍ | 7 | – | 7 | .500 | 17 | – | 13 | .567 |
| Purdue Fort Wayne ‍‍‍ | 7 | – | 7 | .500 | 16 | – | 13 | .552 |
| Lindenwood ‍‍‍ | 7 | – | 7 | .500 | 10 | – | 13 | .435 |
| Quincy ‍‍‍ | 1 | – | 13 | .071 | 8 | – | 19 | .296 |
| McKendree ‍‍‍ | 1 | – | 13 | .071 | 7 | – | 16 | .304 |
† – Conference champion ‡ – 2023 MIVA Tournament champion: y- Invited to the NCAA Volleyball Tournament As of March 27, 2025 Rankings from AVCA

== Roster ==
2023 Lewis Flyers roster
| Defensive specialist/libero: 4 Nico Paula - Freshman; 11 Ryan Collins - (redshirt) Freshman; 13 Connor Keating - (redshirt) Sophomore; Middle blockers: 2 Tyler Simpson - (redshirt) Sophomore; 8 Isaac Benka - (redshirt) Freshman; 10 Shawn Baggs - Freshman; 14 Piotr Wymoczyl - Freshman; 15 Wesley Yusk - (redshirt) Freshman; 17 Michael Sack - (redshirt) Junior; 18 Antonio Rodriguez-Elias - (redshirt) Senior | Outside hitters: 1 Cole Brillhart - (redshirt) Senior; 9 Max Roquet - Sophomore; 10 Alec Lehnert - (redshirt) Senior; 12 Jared Phelan - (redshirt) Junior; 16 Cole Sweitzer - Freshman; 21 Chase Celichhowski - (redshirt) Freshman; 22 John Davis - (redshirt) Junior; 24 Daniel Haber - Freshman | Opposite hitters: 7 Syver Drolsum - Freshman; 20 Nathan DeGraaf - Freshman; 23 Christian Prayer - (redshirt) Junior; Setters: 3 Tyler Morgan - Sophomore; 6 Kevin Kauling - Senior; 19 Carson Steinbach - Freshman; Utility: 5 Jason Gibbs - (redshirt) Senior |

== Schedule ==
TV/Internet Streaming information:

All home games will be televised on GLVC SN. All road games will also be streamed on the oppositions streaming service.

| Date time | Opponent | Rank^{(tournament seed)} | Arena city (tournament) | Television | Score | Attendance | Record (MIVA Record) |
|---|---|---|---|---|---|---|---|
| 1/6; 5 p.m. | vs. #8 UC Irvine | #14 | Smith Fieldhouse; Provo, UT | byutv.org | L 1–3 (28–26, 26–28, 22–25, 23–25) | 249 | 0–1 |
| 1/7; 8 p.m. | @ BYU | #14 | Smith Fieldhouse; Provo, UT | BYUtv | L 1–3 (20–25, 25–23, 17–25, 17–25) | 3,259 | 0–2 |
| 1/10; 7 p.m. | Missouri S&T | #15 | Neil Carey Arena; Romeoville, IL | GLVC SN | W 3–0 (25–17, 25–12, 25–15) | 500 | 1–2 |
| 1/11; 7 p.m. | King | #15 | Neil Carey Arena; Romeoville, IL | GLVC SN | W 3–0 (25–19, 25–16, 25–15) | 350 | 2–2 |
| 1/14; 7 p.m. | UC San Diego | #15 | Neil Carey Arena; Romeoville, IL | GLVC SN | W 3–1 (27-25, 25–20, 23–25, 25-23) | 800 | 3–2 |
| 1/20; 6 p.m. | vs. #8 Stanford | #15 | Austin Convention Center; Austin, TX (First Point Men's Volleyball Collegiate Challenge) | Volleyball World TV | L 1-3 (26-24, 23–25, 20–25, 22-25) | 1,234 | 3–3 |
| 1/21; 4 p.m. | vs. #5 Pepperdine | #15 | Austin Convention Center; Austin, TX (First Point Men's Volleyball Collegiate Challenge) | Volleyball World TV | L 1-3 (21-25, 31–29, 18–25, 20-25) | 863 | 3–4 |
| 1/27; 7 p.m. | St. Francis Brooklyn | #15 | Neil Carey Arena; Romeoville, IL | GLVC SN | W 3–0 (25–18, 25–15, 25–19) | 500 | 4-4 |
| 1/28; 7 p.m. | Maryville | #15 | Neil Carey Arena; Romeoville, IL | GLVC SN | W 3–0 (25–21, 25–16, 25–15) | 500 | 5-4 |
| 2/03; 6 p.m. | @ George Mason | #14 | Recreation Athletic Complex; Fairfax, VA | ESPN+ | L 0-3 (18-25, 23–25, 19–25) | 176 | 5-5 |
| 2/04; 7 p.m. | @ Mount Olive | #14 | Kornegay Arena; Kornegay, NC | Conference Carolinas DN | W 3-0 (25-21, 25–14, 25–20) | | 6-5 |
| 2/09; 6 p.m. | @ #9 Ball State* | | Worthen Arena; Muncie, IN | ESPN+ | W 3-2 (25-22, 19–25, 25–23, 20-25, 18-16) | 1,100 | 7-5 (1-0) |
| 2/11; 6 p.m. | @ #11 Ohio State* | | Covelli Center; Columbus, OH | B1G+ | L 0-3 (23-25, 22-25, 19-25) | 848 | 7-6 (1-1) |
| 2/15; 7 p.m. | Quincy* | | Neil Carey Arena; Romeoville, IL | GLVC SN | W 3-0 (25-16, 25-19, 25-17) | 750 | 8-6 (2-1) |
| 2/17; 7 p.m. | Lindenwood* | | Neil Carey Arena; Romeoville, IL | GLVC SN | L 2-3 (20-25, 25-22, 22-25, 25-20, 12-15) | 500 | 8-7 (2-2) |
| 2/22; 7 p.m. | #10 Loyola Chicago* | | Neil Carey Arena; Romeoville, IL | GLVC SN | L 1-3 (25-27, 19-25, 25-19, 22-25) | 700 | 8-8 (2-3) |
| 2/24; 7 p.m. | @ Purdue Fort Wayne* | | Hilliard Gates Sports Center; Ft. Wayne, IN | ESPN+ | L 1-3 (23-25, 12-25, 25-13, 25-27) | 478 | 8-9 (2-4) |
| 3/03; 7 p.m. | @ McKendree* | | Melvin Price Convocation Center; Lebanon, IL | GLVC SN | W 3-2 (23-25, 20-25, 25-22, 25-21, 15-10) | 175 | 9-9 (3-4) |
| 3/04; 7 p.m. | @ Maryville | | John E. and Adaline Simon Athletic Center; St. Louis, MO | GLVC SN | W 3-0 (25-16, 25-19, 25-23) | 254 | 10-9 |
| 3/08; 7 p.m. | Queens | | Neil Carey Arena; Romeoville, IL | GLVC SN | W 3-0 (31-29, 25-21, 25-15) | 100 | 11-9 |
| 3/10; 7 p.m. | Erskine | | Neil Carey Arena; Romeoville, IL | GLVC SN | W 3-2 (25-20, 25-23, 29-31, 23-25, 15-7) | 750 | 12-9 |
| 3/18; 7 p.m. | McKendree* | | Neil Carey Arena; Romeoville, IL | GLVC SN | W 3-0 (25-23, 25-23, 25-22) | 400 | 13-9 (4-4) |
| 3/23; 7 p.m. | @ #9 Loyola Chicago* | | Joseph J. Gentile Arena; Chicago, IL | ESPN+ | L 0-3 (22-25, 20-25, 20-25) | 805 | 13-10 (4-5) |
| 3/25; 5 p.m. | Purdue Fort Wayne* | | Neil Carey Arena; Romeoville, IL | GLVC SN | W 3-1 (23-25, 25-18, 25-15, 25-22) | 576 | 14-10 (5-5) |
| 3/30; 7 p.m. | #13 Ohio State* | | Neil Carey Arena; Romeoville, IL | GLVC SN | L 0-3 (23-25, 26-28, 19-25) | 500 | 14-11 (5-6) |
| 4/01; 5 p.m. | #12 Ball State* | | Neil Carey Arena; Romeoville, IL | GLVC SN | L 2-3 (22-25, 19-25, 25-21, 25-17, 12-15) | 750 | 14-12 (5-7) |
| 4/06; 7 p.m. | @ Lindenwood* | | Robert F. Hyland Arena; St. Charles, MO | ESPN+ | W 3-0 (25-23, 25-20, 25-23) | 164 | 15-12 (6-7) |
| 4/08; 4 p.m. | @ Quincy* | | Pepsi Arena; Quincy, IL | GLVC SN | W 3-1 (19-25, 25-23, 25-23, 25-19) | 384 | 16-12 (7-7) |
| 4/15; 7 p.m | Purdue Fort Wayne^{(5)} | ^{(4)} | Neil Carey Arena; Romeoville, IL (2022 MIVA Quarterfinals) | GLVC SN | W 3–1 (25-15, 25-18, 16-25, 38-36) | 700 | 17-12 |

*-Indicates conference match.
Times listed are Central Time Zone.

== Announcers for televised games ==
- UC Irvine: No commentary
- BYU: Jarom Jordan, Steve Vail, & Kenzie Koerber
- Missouri S&T: Logan Kap, Allie Lankowicz, & Rachel Kaczorowski
- King: Allie Lankowicz & Chloe Fornetti
- UC San Diego: Allie Lankowicz & Hannah Alvey
- Stanford: Rob Espero & Bill Walton
- Pepperdine: Rob Espero & Bill Walton
- St. Francis Brooklyn: Allie Lankowicz
- Maryville: Allie Lankowicz, Juliana Van Loo, & Hannah Alvey
- George Mason:
- Mount Olive:
- Ball State:
- Ohio State:
- Quincy: Allie Lankowicz
- Lindenwood: No commentary
- Loyola Chicago: Allie Lankowicz & Gracie Schultz
- Purdue Fort Wayne:
- McKendree:
- Maryville:
- Queens: Rick Rocky
- Erskine: Rick Rocky
- McKendree: Rick Rocky & Rachel Kaczorowski
- Loyola Chicago:
- Purdue Fort Wayne: Allie Lankowicz, Samara Martinez & Juliana Van Loo
- Ohio State: Allie Lankowicz, Keegan Carey, & Gracie Schultz
- Ball State: Allie Lankowicz
- Lindenwood: Michael Wagenknecht & Sara Wagenknecht
- Quincy: No commentary
- MIVA Quarterfinal- Purdue Fort Wayne: Rick Rocky & Allie Lankowicz

== Rankings ==
Ranking movements Legend: ██ Increase in ranking ██ Decrease in ranking — = Not ranked RV = Received votes
| | Week | | | | | | | | | | | | | | | | | |
| Poll | Pre | 1 | 2 | 3 | 4 | 5 | 6 | 7 | 8 | 9 | 10 | 11 | 12 | 13 | 14 | 15 | 16 | Final |
|---|---|---|---|---|---|---|---|---|---|---|---|---|---|---|---|---|---|---|
| AVCA Coaches | 14 | 15 | 15 | 15 | 14 | RV | RV | | | | | | | | RV | RV | RV | RV |
| Off the Block Media | Not released | | — | | | | | | | | | | | | | | | |

^The Media did not release a Pre-season or Week 1 poll.
