= Michigan State University Men's Club Volleyball =

American college volleyball team

Michigan State University Men's Volleyball Club
- University: Michigan State University
- Head coach: Sante Perrelli (1989-present season)
- Conference: [[Midwest Intercollegiate Volleyball Association|MIVA]]
- Location: East Lansing, Michigan, US
- Home arena: IM Sports West (capacity: 650)
- Nickname: Spartans
- Colors: Green and white

The Michigan State University Men's Volleyball Club was founded in the late 1950s and revived as a registered student organization at Michigan State University in 1987. It is currently a founding member of the Midwest Intercollegiate Volleyball Association ("MIVA"), and registered with the National Collegiate Volleyball Federation ("NCVF"). The club competes in MIVA organized intercollegiate club competitions throughout the season and the season-ending NCVF National Championships. The club currently has four teams with progressive skill levels—Green, White, Posse, and Greenhorns. Club teams practice at the IM West Sports Arena and participate in a variety of club fundraising and community outreach and supportive activities, like Special Olympics and fundraising for the Greater Lansing Food Bank.

== Club history ==
The MSU Men's Volleyball Club is a self-funded and directed student organization in East Lansing, MI at Michigan State University, relying on student leadership to organize and operate season-long practice and playing opportunities for MSU students. Club leaders are elected each year, and are responsible for administering a yearly budget, coordinating schedules and eligibility with school and league officials, planning practices and play and working cooperatively with coaches, sponsors, service providers and many others. Participant family members and friends frequently attend Club competitions.

The club has open gym hours in the evenings throughout the fall at the IM Sports West Arena. Club team tryouts are typically held at the IM Sports West in late September or early October each year. Club practice sessions take place 2 to 4 times per week during the pre-season, focusing on skill development, rules of the game, team building and placement, and competitive drills and play. Tryouts are open to any MSU student who is eligible under club and university rules.

== Yearly operations ==
On January 1 of each year, the official NCVF season begins. Typically Club teams practice at night and engage in conference and independently sponsored weekend competitions through April. Club teams play against other recognized collegiate club teams in MIVA league play, culminating in BTMVA, Midwestern Intercollegiate Volleyball Association, and NCVF championship events.

Unlike most states in the Midwest, Michigan still does not sponsor boy's interscholastic high school volleyball. Still, the MSU club typically achieves a winning match percentage each year, and has earned several ten Top 10 National Championship finishes, 9 BTMVA Championships, 7 MIVA Championships and frequent top 25 rankings. In addition to practice and play, MSU players sponsor player clinics for junior players – from the inner-city of Detroit to the shores of Lake Michigan. MSU Green, the club's top squad, often travels out of region to represent the club and compete against other college clubs, engage in community service and promote the sport. The 50-team "Spartan Back to the Hardwood Tournament," established in 1989, is the largest pre-season intercollegiate men's volleyball tournament in the nation, drawing club teams and USA Volleyball officials from throughout the United States and Canada.

== Coaching ==
The club is coached by Sante Perrelli who helped students rejuvenate the club in 1987, and has been the club's head coach since that time. Coach Perrelli has USA Volleyball Impact, CAP Level 1 and CAP Level 2 coaching certifications and was named the 2006 National Coach of the Year. Gary Colberg, former Director of Competition for the NCVF National Championship" said "Perrelli's green machine is an organizational model for all collegiate sports to emulate. The Spartans' consistency of high performance is the results of excellent coaching, fiscal management and a commitment to national exposure." Coach Perrelli founded the BTMVA (a division of the MIVA) in 1990 for Big Ten university men's volleyball club teams, and is president and co-founder of the MIVA, Lakeshore Region Volleyball Association, Inc., and the National Collegiate Volleyball Federation, Inc.

Big Ten Champions	MIVA Champions	State Of Michigan Champions
1991	1989	2004
1992	1990	2005
1995	1991	2006
1996	1995	2007
1997	1996	
1998	1997	
2001	2006	
2005
2006

Top 25 Ranking since 1989
