= 2023 McKendree Bearcats men's volleyball team =

American college volleyball season

2023 McKendree Bearcats men's volleyball
- Conference: Midwestern Intercollegiate Volleyball Association
- Record: 7–15 (1–13 MIVA)
- Head coach: Nickie Sanlin (10th season)
- Assistant coach: Jorge Collazo (1st season)
- Home arena: Melvin Price Convocation Center

The 2023 McKendree Bearcats men's volleyball team represented McKendree University in the 2023 NCAA Division I & II men's volleyball season. The Bearcats, led by tenth year head coach Nickie Sanlin, played their home games at Melvin Price Convocation Center. The Bearcats were members of the Midwestern Intercollegiate Volleyball Association and were picked to finish fifth the MIVA in the preseason poll.

2023 Midwestern Intercollegiate Volleyball Association standings
	Conf.				Overall
Team	W		L	PCT	W		L	PCT
No. 13 Loyola Chicago ‍†‍‍	11	–	3	.786	21	–	7	.750
No. 11 Ball State ‍†‍‍	11	–	3	.786	20	–	9	.690
No. 7 Ohio State ‍†‍‡‍^{y}	11	–	3	.786	23	–	10	.697
Lewis ‍‍‍	7	–	7	.500	17	–	13	.567
Purdue Fort Wayne ‍‍‍	7	–	7	.500	16	–	13	.552
Lindenwood ‍‍‍	7	–	7	.500	10	–	13	.435
Quincy ‍‍‍	1	–	13	.071	8	–	19	.296
McKendree ‍‍‍	1	–	13	.071	7	–	16	.304
† – Conference champion ‡ – 2023 MIVA Tournament champion: y- Invited to the NCAA Volleyball Tournament As of March 27, 2025 Rankings from AVCA

== Roster ==
2023 McKendree Bearcats roster
Defensive Specialist/Libero: 1 Francisco Comas - Graduate; 4 Robby Nardoni - Freshman; 9 Jay Miller - Freshman; Middle Blockers: 2 Daniel Duggan - (redshirt) Senior; 15 Jacob Gall - (redshirt) Senior; 21 Maxwell Wootton - Freshman; 24 Rolen Lively - Freshman	Outside Hitters: 6 Tyler Tripp - Sophomore; 8 Aric Olsen - Freshman; 10 Bryce Wetjen - Freshman; 11 Joseph Watkins - Freshman; 12 Cesar Contreras - Junior; 13 Sam Hoskins - (redshirt) Freshman; 17 Matthew Molnar - Freshman; 19 Kevin Schuele - Sophomore; 20 Kyle Wilson - (redshirt) Junior	Opposite Hitters: 7 Jackson Sheehy - Freshman; 18 Nikos Xydakis - Junior; Setters: 3 Tyler Poulsen - (redshirt) Junior; 5 Jack Morikawa - Freshman

== Schedule ==
TV/Internet Streaming information:

All home games will be televised on GLVC SN. Most road games will also be streamed on the oppositions streaming service.

Date Time	Opponent	Rank^{(Tournament Seed)}	Arena City (Tournament)	Television	Score	Attendance	Record (MIVA Record)
1/06; 8 p.m.	@ BYU		Smith Fieldhouse; Provo, UT	BYUtv	L 0–3 (20–25, 21–25, 20–25)	N/A	0–1
1/07; 5 p.m.	vs. #8 UC Irvine		Smith Fieldhouse; Provo, UT	byutv.org	L 0–3 (34–36, 15–25, 19–25)	152	0-2
1/10; 7 p.m.	NJIT		Melvin Price Convocation Center; Lebanon, IL	GLVC SN	W 3–1 (25–22, 25–21, 21–25, 25–20)	250	1–2
1/20; 7 p.m.	Central State		Melvin Price Convocation Center; Lebanon, IL	GLVC SN	Canceled		
1/27; 4 p.m.	vs. St. Francis		Malkin Athletic Center; Cambridge, MA (Harvard Invitational)		W 3–1 (18-25, 25–16, 25–21, 26–24)	78	2-2
1/28; 7 p.m.	@ Harvard		Malkin Athletic Center; Cambridge, MA (Harvard Invitational)	ESPN+	W 3–2 (20-25, 25–19, 25–22, 22–25, 15–10)	115	3-2
2/03; 7 p.m.	Missouri S&T		Melvin Price Convocation Center; Lebanon, IL	GLVC SN	W 3–1 (25-9, 25–20, 23–25, 25–9)		4-2
2/04; 7:30 p.m.	LIU		Melvin Price Convocation Center; Lebanon, IL	GLVC SN	W 3–0 (25-22, 25–20, 26–24)	60	5-2
2/09; 7:30 p.m.	@ #11 Ohio State*		Covelli Center; Columbus, OH	B1G+	L 1-3 (23-25, 25–22, 18–25, 21–25)	340	5-3 (0-1)
2/11; 5 p.m.	@ #9 Ball State*		Worthen Arena; Muncie, IN	ESPN+	L 1-3 (21-25, 23–25, 25–23, 20–25)	1,242	5-4 (0-2)
2/15; 7 p.m.	Lindenwood*		Melvin Price Convocation Center; Lebanon, IL	GLVC SN	L 1-3 (17-25, 25–17, 26–28, 26–28)	243	5-5 (0-3)
2/17; 7 p.m.	@ Quincy*		Melvin Price Convocation Center; Lebanon, IL	GLVC SN	W 3-0 (25-23, 25–19, 25–23)	107	6-5 (1-3)
2/22; 7 p.m.	Purdue Fort Wayne*		Melvin Price Convocation Center; Lebanon, IL	GLVC SN	L 1-3 (22-25, 22–25, 25–23, 20–25)	147	6-6 (1-4)
2/25; 7 p.m.	@ #10 Loyola Chicago*		Joseph J. Gentile Arena; Chicago, IL	ESPN+	L 1-3 (23-25, 25–21, 21–25, 14–25)	749	6-7 (1-5)
3/03; 7 p.m.	Lewis*		Melvin Price Convocation Center; Lebanon, IL	GLVC SN	L 2-3 (25-23, 25–20, 22–25, 21–25, 10–15)	175	6-8 (1-6)
3/10; 6 p.m.	Loyola Chicago*		Melvin Price Convocation Center; Lebanon, IL	GLVC SN	L 2-3 (25-20, 28–26, 22–25, 22–25, 13–15)	167	6-9 (1-7)
3/10; 7 p.m.	King		Melvin Price Convocation Center; Lebanon, IL	GLVC SN	Canceled		
3/18; 7 p.m.	@ Lewis*		Neil Carey Arena; Romeoville, IL	GLVC SN	L 0-3 (23-25, 23–25, 22–25)	400	6-10 (1-8)
3/23; 7 p.m.	@ Purdue Fort Wayne*		Hilliard Gates Sports Center; Ft. Wayne, IN	ESPN+	L 2-3 (23-25, 19–25, 25–22, 26–24, 13–15)	546	6-11 (1-9)
3/30; 7 p.m.	#12 Ball State*		Melvin Price Convocation Center; Lebanon, IL	GLVC SN	L 0-3 (18-25, 21–25, 20–25)	100	6-12 (1-10)
4/01; 7 p.m.	#13 Ohio State*		Melvin Price Convocation Center; Lebanon, IL	GLVC SN	L 1-3 (21-25, 24–26, 25–20, 24–26)	120	6-13 (1-11)
4/06; 7 p.m.	@ Quincy*		Pepsi Arena; Quincy, IL	GLVC SN	L 2-3 (25-27, 25–16, 24–26, 25–19, 13–15)	585	6-14 (1-12)
4/08; 5 p.m.	@ Lindenwood*		Robert F. Hyland Arena; St. Charles, MO	ESPN+	L 1-3 (33-31, 23–25, 22–25, 21–25)		6-15 (1-13)
4/15; 7 p.m.	#11 Loyola Chicago^{(2)}	^{(7)}	Joseph J. Gentile Arena; Chicago, IL (MIVA Quarterfinals)		W 3-2 (19-25, 25–23, 25–20, 20–25, 15–12)	598	7-15

*-Indicates conference match.
Times listed are Central Time Zone.

== Announcers for televised games ==
- BYU: Jarom Jordan, Steve Vail, & Kenzie Koerber
- UC Irvine: No commentary
- NJIT: Alex Gruberman
- Central State:
- Harvard:
- Missouri S&T:
- LIU:
- Ohio State:
- Ball State:
- Lindenwood:
- Quincy:
- Purdue Fort Wayne:
- Loyola Chicago:
- Lewis:
- King:
- Lewis:
- Purdue Fort Wayne:
- Ball State:
- Ohio State:
- Quincy:
- Lindenwood:

== Rankings ==
Ranking movements Legend: RV = Received votes
	Week																	
Poll	Pre	1	2	3	4	5	6	7	8	9	10	11	12	13	14	15	16	Final
AVCA Coaches						RV										RV		
Off the Block Media	Not released																	

^The Media did not release a Pre-season poll.
