= 2023 Quincy Hawks men's volleyball team =

American college volleyball season

2023 Quincy Hawks men's volleyball
- Conference: Midwestern Intercollegiate Volleyball Association
- Record: 8-19 (1–13 MIVA)
- Head coach: Caren Kemner (2nd season)
- Assistant coach: Devin Walker (2nd season)
- Home arena: Pepsi Arena

2023 Midwestern Intercollegiate Volleyball Association standings
	Conf.				Overall
Team	W		L	PCT	W		L	PCT
No. 13 Loyola Chicago ‍†‍‍	11	–	3	.786	21	–	7	.750
No. 11 Ball State ‍†‍‍	11	–	3	.786	20	–	9	.690
No. 7 Ohio State ‍†‍‡‍^{y}	11	–	3	.786	23	–	10	.697
Lewis ‍‍‍	7	–	7	.500	17	–	13	.567
Purdue Fort Wayne ‍‍‍	7	–	7	.500	16	–	13	.552
Lindenwood ‍‍‍	7	–	7	.500	10	–	13	.435
Quincy ‍‍‍	1	–	13	.071	8	–	19	.296
McKendree ‍‍‍	1	–	13	.071	7	–	16	.304
† – Conference champion ‡ – MIVA tournament champion y – Invited to the NCAA tournament Rankings from AVCA

The 2023 Quincy Hawks men's volleyball team represented Quincy University in the 2023 NCAA Division I & II men's volleyball season. The Hawks, led by 2nd year head coach Caren Kemner, played their home games at Pepsi Arena. The Hawks were members of the Midwestern Intercollegiate Volleyball Association and were picked to finish eighth in the MIVA in the preseason poll.

== Roster ==
2023 Quincy Hawks Roster
Defensive Specialist/Libero: 1 Dominik Wagiel - Sophomore; 2 Scottie Dorangrichia - Sophomore; 4 Jared Garcia - Sophomore; 26 Gabriele Lambrini - Graduate; Middle Blockers: 11 Niels Middendorp - Graduate; 15 Logan Gieseke - Freshman; 18 Gunnar Kukkonen - Sophomore; 20 Roman Deryckere - Junior	Outside Hitters: 7 Anthonie Goedheer - Sophomore; 8 Ben Grindel - Freshman; 17 Zackary Zdrojeski - Freshman; 19 Ryne Jacobsen - Freshman; 24 Eddie Jakubauskas - Senior	Opposite Hitters: 5 Raje Alleyne - Sophomore; 8 Ben Grindel - Freshman; 13 Keegan Carey - Graduate; 15 Logan Gieseke - Freshman; Setters: 3 Dylan Feely - Freshman; 9 Trey Severson - Freshman; 14 Logan Brouwer - Freshman; 21 Jonas Holzinger - Sophomore

== Schedule ==
Date Time	Opponent	Rank	Arena City (Tournament)	Television	Score	Attendance	Record (MIVA Record)
1/19; 7 p.m.	vs. Limestone		Student Center Complex; Bristol, TN	Conference Carolinas DN	W 3–2 (20–25, 25–18, 25–20, 19–25, 15–11)	123	1-0
1/19; 7 p.m.	@ King		Student Center Complex; Bristol, TN	Conference Carolinas DN	L 1-3 (25–21, 19–25, 25–27, 22–25)	178	1-1
1/20; 2 p.m.	vs. Lincoln Memorial		Student Center Complex; Bristol, TN	Conference Carolinas DN	L 0-3 (18–25, 23–25, 13–25)	123	1-2
1/20; 4:30 p.m.	vs. Charleston (WV)		Student Center Complex; Bristol, TN	Conference Carolinas DN	L 0-3 (19–25, 15–25, 23–25)	107	1-3
1/25; 7 p.m.	vs. Maryville		Pepsi Arena; Quincy, IL	GLVC SN	W 3-0 (25–19, 25–21, 25–19)	175	2-3
1/27; 7 p.m.	Missouri S&T		Pepsi Arena; Quincy, IL	GLVC SN	W 3-0 (26–24, 25–18, 25–22)	250	3-3
2/04; 2 p.m.	St. Ambrose		Pepsi Arena; Quincy, IL	GLVC SN	W 3-0 (25–15, 25–14, 25–8)	134	4-3
2/04; 5 p.m.	Grand View		Pepsi Arena; Quincy, IL	GLVC SN	L 0-3 (22–25, 19–25, 17–25)	225	4-4
2/10; 7 p.m.	#13 Loyola Chicago*		Pepsi Arena; Quincy, IL	GLVC SN	L 0-3 (18–25, 21–25, 19–25)	245	4-5 (0–1)
2/11; 7 p.m.	Purdue Fort Wayne*		Pepsi Arena; Quincy, IL	GLVC SN	L 0-3 (15–25, 17–25, 18–25)	589	4-6 (0–2)
2/15; 7 p.m.	@ Lewis*		Neil Carey Arena; Romeoville, IL	GLVC SN	L 0-3 (16–25, 19–25, 17–25)	750	4-7 (0–3)
2/17; 7 p.m.	@ McKendree*		Melvin Price Convocation Center; Lebanon, IL	GLVC SN	L 0-3 (23–25, 19–25, 23–25)	107	4-8 (0–4)
2/24; 7 p.m.	#11 Ohio State*		Pepsi Arena; Quincy, IL	GLVC SN	L 0-3 (16–25, 16–25, 19–25)	675	4-9 (0–5)
2/25; 5 p.m.	#12 Ball State*		Pepsi Arena; Quincy, IL	GLVC SN	L 0-3 (23–25, 22–25, 22–25)	563	4-10 (0–6)
3/01; 7 p.m.	Milwaukee School of Engineering		Pepsi Arena; Quincy, IL	GLVC SN	W 3-1 (25–16, 22–25, 25–23, 25–16)	193	5-10
3/02; 7 p.m.	Lindenwood*		Pepsi Arena; Quincy, IL	GLVC SN	L 0-3 (21–25, 18–25, 32–34)	189	5-11 (0–7)
3/04; 7 p.m.	Missouri Valley College	Canceled	Pepsi Arena; Quincy, IL	GLVC SN			
3/06; 5 p.m.	Cornerstone University		Pepsi Arena; Quincy, IL	GLVC SN	L 2-3 (24–26, 25–14, 25–20, 17–25, 12–15)	252	5-12
3/09; 7 p.m.	@ Missouri S&T		Gibson Arena; Rolla, MO	GLVC SN	W 3-0 (37–31, 25–20, 25–20)	122	6-12
3/10; 5 p.m.	@ Maryville		John E. and Adaline Simon Athletic Center; St. Louis, MO	GLVC SN	W 3-1 (26–28, 25–19, 25–23, 25–18)	123	7-12
3/18; 2 p.m.	@ Lindenwood*		Robert F. Hyland Arena; St. Charles, MO	ESPN+	L 0-3 (16–25, 15–25, 21–25)		7-13 (0–8)
3/24; 6 p.m.	@ #12 Ball State*		Worthen Arena; Muncie, IN	ESPN+	L 1-3 (13–25, 25–20, 19–25, 21–25)	957	7-14 (0–9)
3/25; 6 p.m.	@ #15 Ohio State*		Covelli Center; Columbus, OH	B1G+	L 0-3 (10–25, 11–25, 19–25)	1,279	7-15 (0–10)
3/30; 6 p.m.	@ Purdue Fort Wayne*		Hilliard Gates Sports Center; Ft. Wayne, IN	ESPN+	L 1-3 (25–17, 17–25, 17–25, 21–25)	418	7-16 (0–11)
4/01; 5 p.m.	@ #10 Loyola Chicago*		Joseph J. Gentile Arena; Chicago, IL	ESPN+	L 2-3 (16–25, 23–25, 25–23, 25–23, 7–15)	719	7-17 (0–12)
4/06; 7 p.m.	McKendree*		Pepsi Arena; Quincy, IL	GLVC SN	W 3-2 (27–25, 16–25, 26–24, 19–25, 15–13)	585	8-17 (1–12)
4/08; 4 p.m.	Lewis*		Pepsi Arena; Quincy, IL	GLVC SN	L 1-3 (25–19, 23–25, 23–25, 19–25)	384	8-18 (1–13)
4/15; 6 p.m.	@ #10 Ball State^{(1)}	^{(8)}	Worthen Arena (MIVA Quarterfinals)		L 0-3 (20–25, 19–25, 15–25)	757	8-19

*-Indicates conference match.
Times listed are Central Time Zone.

== Broadcasters ==
- Limestone: No commentary
- King: Hailee Blankenship & Lydia Buchanan
- Lincoln Memorial: No commentary
- Charleston (WV): No commentary
- Maryville:
- Missouri S&T:
- St. Ambrose:
- Grand View:
- Loyola Chicago:
- Purdue Fort Wayne:
- Lewis:
- McKendree:
- Ohio State:
- Ball State:
- Milwaukee School of Engineering:
- Lindenwood:
- Missouri Valley College:
- Cornerstone:
- Missouri S&T:
- Maryville:
- Lindenwood:
- Ball State:
- Ohio State:
- Purdue Fort Wayne:
- Loyola Chicago:
- McKendree:
- Lewis:

== Honors ==
To be filled in upon completion of the season.
