= 2023 Purdue Fort Wayne Mastodons men's volleyball team =

American college volleyball season

2023 Purdue Fort Wayne Mastodons men's volleyball
- Conference: Midwestern Intercollegiate Volleyball Association
- Record: 16–13 (7–7 MIVA)
- Head coach: Ryan Perrotte (8th season)
- Assistant coach: Jim Palilonis (2nd season)
- Home arena: Hilliard Gates Sports Center

2023 Midwestern Intercollegiate Volleyball Association standings
	Conf.				Overall
Team	W		L	PCT	W		L	PCT
No. 13 Loyola Chicago ‍†‍‍	11	–	3	.786	21	–	7	.750
No. 11 Ball State ‍†‍‍	11	–	3	.786	20	–	9	.690
No. 7 Ohio State ‍†‍‡‍^{y}	11	–	3	.786	23	–	10	.697
Lewis ‍‍‍	7	–	7	.500	17	–	13	.567
Purdue Fort Wayne ‍‍‍	7	–	7	.500	16	–	13	.552
Lindenwood ‍‍‍	7	–	7	.500	10	–	13	.435
Quincy ‍‍‍	1	–	13	.071	8	–	19	.296
McKendree ‍‍‍	1	–	13	.071	7	–	16	.304
† – Conference champion ‡ – MIVA tournament champion y – Invited to the NCAA tournament Rankings from AVCA

The 2023 Purdue Fort Wayne Mastodons men's volleyball team represented Purdue University Fort Wayne in the 2023 NCAA Division I & II men's volleyball season. The Mastodons, led by eighth year head coach Ryan Perrotte, played their home games at Hilliard Gates Sports Center. The Mastodons were members of the Midwestern Intercollegiate Volleyball Association and were picked to finish fifth in the MIVA in the preseason poll.

== Roster ==
2023 Purdue Fort Wayne Mastodons roster
Defensive specialist/libero: 3 Noah Melendez – Graduate; 14 KJ Glab – Sophomore; Middle blockers: 1 Filip Kierzkowski – Freshman; 12 Ryan Steponaitis – Freshman; 21 Emmanuel Jurineack – Freshman; 22 Bryce Walker – Junior	Outside hitters: 2 Wilmer Hernandez – Senior; 4 Jon Diedrich – Senior; 7 Axel Melendez Watts – Sophomore; 8 Mark Frazier – Sophomore; 11 Carlos Mercado – Senior; 18 Hunter Clasen – (redshirt) Sophomore	Opposite hitters: 4 Jon Diedrich – Senior; 5 Cal Krohn – Freshman; 8 Mark Frazier – Sophomore; 11 Carlos Mercado – Senior; Setters: 15 Davey Singer – Sophomore; 16 Zach Solomon – Sophomore; 19 Sergio Carrillo – Graduate

== Schedule ==
Date time	Opponent	Rank	Arena city (tournament)	Television	Score	Attendance	Record (MIVA Record)
1/06; 7 p.m.	King		Hilliard Gates Sports Center; Fort Wayne, IN	ESPN+	W 3–0 (25–22, 25–17, 25–14)	334	1–0
1/07; 7 p.m.	NJIT		Hilliard Gates Sports Center; Fort Wayne, IN	ESPN+	L 0–3 (21–25, 18–25, 23–25)	412	1–1
1/13; 7 p.m.	Carthage		Hilliard Gates Sports Center; Fort Wayne, IN	ESPN+	W 3–0 (25–22, 25–23, 25–23)	602	2–1
1/20; 7 p.m.	Missouri S&T		Hilliard Gates Sports Center; Fort Wayne, IN	YouTube	W 3–0 (25–20, 25–15, 25–17)	455	3–1
1/21; 5 p.m.	Harvard		Hilliard Gates Sports Center; Fort Wayne, IN	YouTube	W 3–0 (25–23, 25–23, 25–19)	497	4–1
1/27; 7 p.m.	Sacred Heart		Hilliard Gates Sports Center; Fort Wayne, IN	ESPN+	W 3–0 (25–22, 25–22, 25–12)	434	5–1
1/28; 3 p.m.	Queens		Hilliard Gates Sports Center; Fort Wayne, IN	ESPN+	W 3–0 (25–23, 25–22, 25–21)	433	6–1
2/03; 5 p.m.	vs. Mount Olive		Recreation Athletic Complex; Fairfax, VA (DC Challenge)		W 3–0 (25–21, 25–19, 27–25)	0	7–1
2/04; 7 p.m.	@ George Mason		Recreation Athletic Complex; Fairfax, VA	ESPN+	W 3–2 (20–25, 25–22, 29–31, 25–22, 17–15)	237	8–1
2/08; 8 p.m.	@ Maryville		Moloney Arena; St. Louis, MO	GLVC SN	W 3–0 (25–17, 25–19, 25–17)	145	9–1
2/10; 8 p.m.	@ Lindenwood*		Robert F. Hyland Arena; St. Charles, MO	ESPN+	L 2–3 (17–25, 25–19, 23–25, 29–27, 11–15)	133	9–2 (0–1)
2/11; 8 p.m.	@ Quincy*		Pepsi Arena; Quincy, IL	GLVC SN	W 3–0 (25–15, 25–17, 25–18)	589	10–2 (1–1)
2/16; 8 p.m.	Ohio State*		Hilliard Gates Sports Center; Fort Wayne, IN	ESPN+	L 1–3 (25–23, 16–25, 32–34, 19–25)	987	10–3 (1–2)
2/18; 7 p.m.	Ball State*		Hilliard Gates Sports Center; Fort Wayne, IN	ESPN+	L 2–3 (20–25, 26–24, 22–25, 25–19, 8–15)	918	10–4 (1–3)
2/22; 8 p.m.	@ McKendree*		Melvin Price Convocation Center; Lebanon, IL	GLVC SN	W 3–1 (25–22, 25–22, 23–25, 25–20)	147	11–4 (2–3)
2/24; 7 p.m.	Lewis*		Hilliard Gates Sports Center; Fort Wayne, IN	ESPN+	W 3–1 (25–23, 25–12, 13–25, 27–25)	478	12–4 (3–3)
3/04; 8 p.m.	@ #9 Loyola Chicago*		Joseph J. Gentile Arena; Chicago, IL	ESPN+	L 2–3 (25–22, 21–25, 17–25, 25–21, 12–15)	592	12–5 (3–4)
3/10; 12 a.m.	@ #1 Hawai'i		Stan Sheriff Center; Honolulu, HI (Outrigger Volleyball Invitational)	ESPN+	L 0–3 (25–27, 13–25, 20–25)	4,696	12–6
3/10; 9 p.m.	vs. #2 UCLA		Stan Sheriff Center; Honolulu, HI (Outrigger Volleyball Invitational)		L 0–3 (20–25, 21–25, 16–25)	0	12–7
3/11; 9 p.m.	vs. #3 Penn State		Stan Sheriff Center; Honolulu, HI (Outrigger Volleyball Invitational)		L 0–3 (15–25, 11–25, 16–25)	0	12–8
3/17; 7 p.m.	#14 Charleston (WV)		Hilliard Gates Sports Center; Fort Wayne, IN	ESPN+	L 0–3 (28–30, 21–25, 23–25)	486	12–9
3/18; 7 p.m.	#9 Loyola Chicago*		Hilliard Gates Sports Center; Fort Wayne, IN	ESPN+	W 3–2 (25–18, 27–25, 23–25, 20–25, 15–12)	570	13–9 (4–4)
3/23; 7 p.m.	McKendree*		Hilliard Gates Sports Center; Fort Wayne, IN	ESPN+	W 3–2 (25–23, 25–19, 22–25, 24–26, 15–13)	546	14–9 (5–4)
3/25; 6 p.m.	@ Lewis*		Neil Carey Arena; Romeoville, IL	GLVC SN	L 1–3 (25–23, 18–25, 15–25, 22–25)	576	14–10 (5–5)
3/30; 7 p.m.	Quincy*		Hilliard Gates Sports Center; Fort Wayne, IN	ESPN+	W 3–1 (17–25, 25–17, 25–17, 25–21)	418	15–10 (6–5)
4/01; 7 p.m.	Lindenwood*		Hilliard Gates Sports Center; Fort Wayne, IN	ESPN+	W 3–1 (25–22, 22–25, 25–18, 25–17)	549	16–10 (7–5)
4/06; 7 p.m.	@ #13 Ohio State*		Covelli Center; Columbus, OH	B1G+	L 0–3 (14–25, 19–25, 15–25)	587	16–11 (7–6)
4/08; 7 p.m.	@ #11 Ball State*		Worthen Arena; Muncie, IN	ESPN+	L 0–3 (17–25, 17–25, 22–25)	1,211	16–12 (7–7)
4/15; 7 p.m	@ Lewis^{(4)}	^{(5)}	Neil Carey Arena; Romeoville, IL (2022 MIVA Quarterfinals)	GLVC SN	L 1–3 (15–25, 18–25, 25–16, 36–38)	700	16–13

*-Indicates conference match.
Times listed are Eastern Time Zone.

== Broadcasters ==
- King: Mike Maahs & Victoria Brisack
- NJIT: Mike Maahs & Steve Florio
- Carthage: Mike Maahs & Steve Florio
- Missouri S&T:
- Harvard:
- Sacred Heart:
- Queens:
- George Mason:
- Maryville:
- Lindenwood:
- Quincy:
- Ohio State:
- Ball State:
- McKendree:
- Lewis:
- Loyola Chicago:
- Hawai'i:
- Charleston (WV):
- Loyola Chicago:
- McKendree:
- Lewis:
- Quincy:
- Lindenwood:
- Ohio State:
- Ball State:

== Rankings ==
Ranking movements Legend: RV = Received votes
	Week																	
Poll	Pre	1	2	3	4	5	6	7	8	9	10	11	12	13	14	15	16	Final
AVCA Coaches	RV					RV			RV	RV				RV				
Off the Block Media	Not released					RV												

^The Media did not release a Pre-season poll.

== Honors ==
To be filled in upon completion of the season.
