= 2023 Lindenwood Lions men's volleyball team =

American college volleyball season

2023 Lindenwood Lions men's volleyball
- Conference: Midwestern Intercollegiate Volleyball Association
- Record: 10–13 (7–7 MIVA)
- Head coach: Joe Kosciw (5th season)
- Assistant coach: Michael Lanera (1st season)
- Home arena: Robert F. Hyland Arena

2023 Midwestern Intercollegiate Volleyball Association standings
| | Conf. | | | | Overall |
| Team | W | | L | PCT | W | | L | PCT |
|---|---|---|---|---|---|---|---|---|
| No. 13 Loyola Chicago ‍†‍‍ | 11 | – | 3 | .786 | 21 | – | 7 | .750 |
| No. 11 Ball State ‍†‍‍ | 11 | – | 3 | .786 | 20 | – | 9 | .690 |
| No. 7 Ohio State ‍†‍‡‍^{y} | 11 | – | 3 | .786 | 23 | – | 10 | .697 |
| Lewis ‍‍‍ | 7 | – | 7 | .500 | 17 | – | 13 | .567 |
| Purdue Fort Wayne ‍‍‍ | 7 | – | 7 | .500 | 16 | – | 13 | .552 |
| Lindenwood ‍‍‍ | 7 | – | 7 | .500 | 10 | – | 13 | .435 |
| Quincy ‍‍‍ | 1 | – | 13 | .071 | 8 | – | 19 | .296 |
| McKendree ‍‍‍ | 1 | – | 13 | .071 | 7 | – | 16 | .304 |
† – Conference champion ‡ – 2023 MIVA Tournament champion: y- Invited to the NCAA Volleyball Tournament As of March 13, 2025 Rankings from AVCA

The 2023 Lindenwood Lions men's volleyball team represented Lindenwood University in the 2023 NCAA Division I & II men's volleyball season. The Lions, led by fifth year head coach Joe Kosciw, played their home games at Robert F. Hyland Arena. The Lions were members of the Midwestern Intercollegiate Volleyball Association and were picked to finish seventh in the MIVA preseason poll. Because D1 and D2 men's volleyball are combined, Lindenwood's move to D1's OVC did not affect the men's volleyball program, and they were eligible for all postseason play.

== Roster ==
2023 Lindenwood Lions roster
| Defensive specialist/libero: 2 Blase Catanese - Sophomore; 5 Kyle Deutschmann - Senior; 17 Eric Winn - Junior; Middle blockers: 8 Kadin Warner - Sophomore; 14 Hunter Bailey - Senior; 18 Rodney Wallace - Junior; 19 Vicente Mardones - (redshirt) Junior; 20 Kenneth Naples - (redshirt) Sophomore | Outside hitters: 4 Carter Stenmark - (redshirt) Freshman; 10 Cole Schuler - Sophomore; 12 Matt Arens - Sophomore; 13 Brendan Louthain - Freshman; 21 A.J. Lewis - Senior; 24 Clay Wieter - (redshirt) Sophomore | Opposite hitters: 9 RaShawn Bonner - Senior; 11 Ian Schuller - Freshman; 15 Nolan Krygsheld - Freshman; 18 Rodney Wallace - Junior; 22 Jacob Christopher - (redshirt) Sophomore; Setters: 6 Charlie Podgorny - Freshman; 7 Jose Vargas - Sophomore; 16 Connor Sheehan - Junior |

== Schedule ==
| Date time | Opponent | Rank | Arena city (tournament) | Television | Score | Attendance | Record (MIVA Record) |
|---|---|---|---|---|---|---|---|
| 1/06; 7 p.m. | @ #11 Grand Canyon | | GCU Arena; Phoenix, AZ | ESPN+ | L 1–3 (21–25, 15–25, 37–35, 13–25) | 1,057 | 0–1 |
| 1/08; 1 p.m. | @ #11 Grand Canyon | | GCU Arena; Phoenix, AZ | ESPN+ | L 0–3 (21–25, 22–25, 21–25) | 418 | 0–2 |
| 1/11; 7 p.m. | NJIT | | Robert F. Hyland Arena; St. Charles, MO | ESPN+ | W 3–0 (25–19, 25–21, 25–23) | 567 | 1–2 |
| 1/13; 7 p.m. | vs. #11 USC | | Walter Pyramid; Long Beach, CA | | L 0-3 (16-25, 21–25, 16–25) | | 1-3 |
| 1/14; 9 p.m. | @ #3 Long Beach State | | Walter Pyramid; Long Beach, CA | ESPN+ | L 0-3 (17-25, 21–25, 17–25) | 1,113 | 1-4 |
| 2/03; 7 p.m. | LIU | | Robert F. Hyland Arena; St. Charles, MO | ESPN+ | L 0-3 (21-25, 22–25, 22–25) | 501 | 1-5 |
| 2/04; 7:30 p.m. | Missouri S&T | | Robert F. Hyland Arena; St. Charles, MO | ESPN+ | W 3-0 (25-21, 25–19, 25–14) | 543 | 2-5 |
| 2/10; 7 p.m. | Purdue Fort Wayne* | | Robert F. Hyland Arena; St. Charles, MO | ESPN+ | W 3-2 (25-17, 19–25, 25–23, 27–29, 15–11) | 133 | 3-5 (1-0) |
| 2/11; 7 p.m. | #13 Loyola Chicago* | | Robert F. Hyland Arena; St. Charles, MO | ESPN+ | L 2-3 (22-25, 23–25, 25–17, 30–28, 12–15) | 164 | 3-6 (1-1) |
| 2/15; 7 p.m. | @ McKendree* | | Melvin Price Convocation Center; Lebanon, IL | GLVC SN | W 3-1 (25-17, 17–25, 28–26, 28–26) | 243 | 4-6 (2-1) |
| 2/17; 5 p.m. | @ Lewis* | | Neil Carey Arena; Chicago, IL | GLVC SN | W 3-2 (25-20, 22–25, 25–22, 20–25, 15–12) | 500 | 5-6 (3-1) |
| 2/24; 7 p.m. | #12 Ball State* | | Robert F. Hyland Arena; St. Charles, MO | ESPN+ | L 2-3 (25-14, 25–18, 17–25, 22–25, 8–15) | 312 | 5-7 (3-2) |
| 2/25; 7:30 p.m. | #11 Ohio State* | | Robert F. Hyland Arena; St. Charles, MO | ESPN+ | W 3-2 (25-19, 23–25, 16–25, 25–22, 22–20) | 523 | 6-7 (4-2) |
| 3/02; 7 p.m. | @ Quincy* | | Pepsi Arena; Quincy, IL | GLVC SN | W 3-0 (25-21, 25–18, 34–32) | 189 | 7-7 (5-2) |
| 3/11; 12 p.m. | Maryville | | Robert F. Hyland Arena; St. Charles, MO | ESPN+ | W 3-0 (25-15, 26–24, 25–19) | 128 | 8-7 |
| 3/18; 2 p.m. | Quincy* | | Robert F. Hyland Arena; St. Charles, MO | ESPN+ | W 3-0 (25-16, 25–15, 25–21) | | 9-7 (6-2) |
| 3/24; 6 p.m. | @ #15 Ohio State* | | Covelli Center; Columbus, OH | B1G+ | L 1-3 (21-25, 21–25, 25–20, 13–25) | | 9-8 (6-3) |
| 3/25; 5 p.m. | @ #12 Ball State* | | Worthen Arena; Muncie, IN | ESPN+ | L 0-3 (19-25, 18–25, 17–25) | 981 | 9-9 (6-4) |
| 3/31; 7 p.m. | @ #10 Loyola Chicago* | | Joseph J. Gentile Arena; Chicago, IL | ESPN+ | L 0-3 (24-26, 20–25, 23–25) | | 9-10 (6-5) |
| 4/01; 6 p.m. | @ Purdue Fort Wayne* | | Hilliard Gates Sports Center; Ft. Wayne, IN | ESPN+ | L 1-3 (22-25, 25–22, 18–25, 17–25) | | 9-11 (6-6) |
| 4/06; 7 p.m. | Lewis* | | Robert F. Hyland Arena; St. Charles, MO | ESPN+ | L 0-3 (23-25, 20–25, 23–25) | | 9-12 (6-7) |
| 4/08; 3 p.m. | McKendree* | | Robert F. Hyland Arena; St. Charles, MO | ESPN+ | W 3-1 (31-33, 25–23, 25–22, 25–21) | | 10-12 (7-7) |
| 4/15; 5 p.m. | @ #11 Ohio State^{(3)} | ^{(6)} | Covelli Center; Columbus, OH (MIVA Quarterfinals) | B1G+ | L 0-3 (23–25, 23–25, 23–25) | 673 | 10-13 |

*-Indicates conference match.
Times listed are Central Time Zone.

== Broadcasters ==
- Grand Canyon: Houston Boe & Braden Dohrmann
- Grand Canyon: Braden Dohrmann & Houston Boe
- NJIT: Michael Wagenknecht & Sara Wagenknecht
- Long Beach State: Matt Brown & Tyler Kulakowski
- LIU: Michael Wagenknecht & Sara Wagenknecht
- Missouri S&T:
- Purdue Fort Wayne:
- Loyola Chicago:
- McKendree:
- Lewis:
- Ball State:
- Ohio State:
- Quincy:
- King:
- Maryville:
- Quincy:
- Ohio State:
- Ball State:
- Loyola Chicago:
- Purdue Fort Wayne:
- Lewis:
- McKendree:

== Rankings ==
Ranking movements Legend: RV = Received votes
| | Week | | | | | | | | | | | | | | | | | |
| Poll | Pre | 1 | 2 | 3 | 4 | 5 | 6 | 7 | 8 | 9 | 10 | 11 | 12 | 13 | 14 | 15 | 16 | Final |
|---|---|---|---|---|---|---|---|---|---|---|---|---|---|---|---|---|---|---|
| AVCA Coaches | | | | | | | | | RV | RV | RV | RV | | | | | | |
| Off the Block Media | Not released | | | | | | | | | | | | | | | | | |

^The Media did not release a Pre-season poll.

== Honors ==
To be filled in upon competition of the season.
