= 2023 Ohio State Buckeyes men's volleyball team =

American college volleyball season

2023 Ohio State Buckeyes men's volleyball

MIVA Regular Season Co-Champions MIVA Tournament Champions

NCAA Tournament, Quarterfinals
- Conference: Midwestern Intercollegiate Volleyball Association
- Record: 23–10 (11–3 MIVA)
- Head coach: Kevin Burch (4th season)
- Assistant coaches: Hudson Bates (4th season); Luke Wood Maloney (4th season)
- Home arena: Covelli Center

2023 Midwestern Intercollegiate Volleyball Association standings
| | Conf. | | | | Overall |
| Team | W | | L | PCT | W | | L | PCT |
|---|---|---|---|---|---|---|---|---|
| No. 13 Loyola Chicago ‍†‍‍ | 11 | – | 3 | .786 | 21 | – | 7 | .750 |
| No. 11 Ball State ‍†‍‍ | 11 | – | 3 | .786 | 20 | – | 9 | .690 |
| No. 7 Ohio State ‍†‍‡‍^{y} | 11 | – | 3 | .786 | 23 | – | 10 | .697 |
| Lewis ‍‍‍ | 7 | – | 7 | .500 | 17 | – | 13 | .567 |
| Purdue Fort Wayne ‍‍‍ | 7 | – | 7 | .500 | 16 | – | 13 | .552 |
| Lindenwood ‍‍‍ | 7 | – | 7 | .500 | 10 | – | 13 | .435 |
| Quincy ‍‍‍ | 1 | – | 13 | .071 | 8 | – | 19 | .296 |
| McKendree ‍‍‍ | 1 | – | 13 | .071 | 7 | – | 16 | .304 |
† – Conference champion ‡ – 2023 MIVA Tournament champion: y- Invited to the NCAA Volleyball Tournament As of March 13, 2025 Rankings from AVCA

The 2023 Ohio State Buckeyes men's volleyball team represented Ohio State University in the 2023 NCAA Division I & II men's volleyball season. The Buckeyes, led by fourth year head coach Kevin Burch, played their home games at Covelli Center. The Buckeyes were members of the Midwestern Intercollegiate Volleyball Association and were picked to finish third in the MIVA in the preseason poll.

== Roster ==
2023 Ohio State Buckeyes roster
| Defensive specialist/libero: 1 Grant Strong - (redshirt) Freshman; 2 Thomas Poole - Junior; Middle blockers: 3 Alex Cabana - Senior; 4 Jason Kozvak - (redshirt) Freshman; 11 Justin Howard - (redshirt) Junior; 15 Hudson Harris - Sophomore; 16 Ben Braun - (redshirt) Freshman; 17 Samuel Clark - Senior; 18 Cole Young - Sophomore | Outside hitters: 7 Jacob Pasteur - Junior; 9 Daniel Hurley - Freshman; 10 Ben Putnam - Freshman; 14 Kyle Teune - Sophomore; 19 Jack Stevens - (redshirt) Senior; 21 Jack O'Riordan - Freshman | Opposite hitters: 3 Alex Cabana - Senior; 4 Jason Kozak - (redshirt) Freshman; 6 Shane Wetzel - Freshman; 9 Daniel Hurley - Freshman; 16 Ben Braun - (redshirt) Freshman; 20 Jimmy Webb - Junior; Setters: 5 Noah Platfoot - Junior; 8 Michael Wright - (redshirt) Junior; 12 Niko Williams - Freshman |

== Schedule ==
| Date time | Opponent | Rank | Arena city (tournament) | Television | Score | Attendance | Record (MIVA Record) |
|---|---|---|---|---|---|---|---|
| 1/05; 7 p.m. | Central State | #13 | Covelli Center; Columbus, OH | B1G+ | W 3–0 (25–11, 25–19, 25–23) | 396 | 1–0 |
| 1/07; 4 p.m. | #4 Penn State | #13 | Covelli Center; Columbus, OH (Big Ten Showdown) | B1G+ | L 1–3 (20–25, 17–25, 25–23, 21–25) | 1,005 | 1–1 |
| 1/14; 5 p.m. | vs. #9 Grand Canyon | #14 | Recreation Athletic Complex; Fairfax, VA (Patriot Invitational) | | L 2–3 (25-23, 18–25, 23–25, 25–18, 10-15) | | 1-2 |
| 1/15; 3 p.m. | @ George Mason | #14 | Recreation Athletic Complex; Fairfax, VA (Patriot Invitational) | ESPN+ | W 3-1 (25-17, 25-16, 25-27, 26-24) | 413 | 2-2 |
| 1/20; 7 p.m. | Maryville | #14 | Covelli Center; Columbus, OH | B1G+ | W 3-0 (25-13, 25-18, 25-18) | 653 | 3-2 |
| 1/21; 7 p.m. | Missouri S&T | #14 | Covelli Center; Columbus, OH | B1G+ | W 3-0 (25-17, 25-16, 25-16) | 650 | 4-2 |
| 1/26; 7 p.m. | Princeton | #13 | Covelli Center; Columbus, OH | B1G+ | W 3-1 (27-25, 25-18, 28-30, 25-23) | 568 | 5-2 |
| 1/27; 7 p.m. | Princeton | #13 | Covelli Center; Columbus, OH | B1G+ | W 3-2 (25-13, 23-25, 17-25, 25-17, 15-9) | 722 | 6-2 |
| 2/03; 4 p.m. | vs. #2 UCLA | #13 | Rec Hall; University Park, PA (Big Ten/Pac-12 Challenge) | | L 1-3 (22-25, 20-25, 25-23, 23-25) | | 6-3 |
| 2/04; 4 p.m. | vs. #10 USC | #13 | Rec Hall; University Park, PA (Big Ten/Pac-12 Challenge) | | W 3-1 (25-19, 20-25, 25-20, 25-18) | 0 | 7-3 |
| 2/09; 7 p.m. | McKendree* | #11 | Covelli Center; Columbus, OH | B1G+ | W 3-1 (25-23, 22-25, 25-18, 25-21) | 340 | 8-3 (1-0) |
| 2/11; 7 p.m. | Lewis* | #11 | Covelli Center; Columbus, OH | B1G+ | W 3-0 (25-23, 25-22, 25-19) | 848 | 9-3 (2-0) |
| 2/16; 3 p.m. | @ Purdue Fort Wayne* | #10 | Hilliard Gates Sports Center; Ft. Wayne, IN | ESPN+ | W 3-1 (23-25, 25-16, 34-32, 25-19) | 987 | 10-3 (3-0) |
| 2/18; 8 p.m. | @ #13 Loyola Chicago* | #10 | Joseph J. Gentile Arena; Chicago, IL | ESPN+ | L 0-3 (20-25, 21-25, 18-25) | 1,206 | 10-4 (3-1) |
| 2/24; 8 p.m. | @ Quincy* | #11 | Pepsi Arena; Quincy, IL | GLVC SN | W 3-0 (25-16, 25-16, 25-19) | 675 | 11-4 (4-1) |
| 2/25; 8:30 p.m. | @ Lindenwood* | #11 | Robert F. Hyland Arena; St. Charles, MO | ESPN+ | L 2-3 (19-25, 25-23, 25-16, 22-25, 20-22) | 523 | 11-5 (4-2) |
| 3/04; 7 p.m. | #15 Charleston (WV) | #13 | Covelli Center; Columbus, OH | B1G+ | L 1-3 (25-23, 19-25, 23-25, 26-28) | 1,019 | 11-6 |
| 3/10; 9 p.m. | @ #8 BYU | #15 | Smith Fieldhouse; Provo, UT | BYUtv | L 1-3 (23-25, 23-25, 25-23, 21-25) | 3,598 | 11-7 |
| 3/11; 9 p.m. | @ #8 BYU | #15 | Smith Fieldhouse; Provo, UT | BYUtv | L 2-3 (23-25, 15-25, 25-14, 25-23, 7-15) | 5,071 | 11-8 |
| 3/15; 7 p.m. | @ #12 Ball State* | #15 | Worthen Arena; Muncie, IN | ESPN+ | L 0-3 (24-26, 15-25, 20-25) | 1,350 | 11-9 (4-3) |
| 3/18; 7 p.m. | #12 Ball State* | #15 | Covelli Center; Columbus, OH | B1G+ | W 3-2 (23-25, 24-26, 25-18, 26-24, 15-12) | 965 | 12-9 (5-3) |
| 3/21; 7 p.m. | @ #1 Penn State | #15 | Rec Hall; University Park, PA (Big Ten Showdown) | B1G+ | W 3-2 (25-21, 18-25, 22-25, 25-21, 15-13) | 1,095 | 13-9 |
| 3/24; 7 p.m. | @ Lindenwood* | #15 | Covelli Center; Columbus, OH | B1G+ | W 3-1 (25-21, 25-21, 20-25, 25-13) | | 14-9 (6-3) |
| 3/25; 5 p.m. | Quincy* | #15 | Covelli Center; Columbus, OH | B1G+ | W 3-0 (25-10, 25-11, 25-19) | 1,279 | 15-9 (7-3) |
| 3/30; 8 p.m. | @ Lewis* | #13 | Neil Carey Arena; Romeoville, IL | GLVC SN | W 3-0 (25-23, 28-26, 25-19) | 500 | 16-9 (8-3) |
| 4/01; 6 p.m. | @ McKendree* | #13 | Melvin Price Convocation Center; Lebanon, IL | GLVC SN | W 3-1 (25-21, 26-24, 20-25, 26-24) | 120 | 17-9 (9-3) |
| 4/06; 7 p.m. | Purdue Fort Wayne* | #13 | Covelli Center; Columbus, OH | B1G+ | W 3-0 (25-14, 25-19, 25-15) | 587 | 18-9 (10-3) |
| 4/08; 5 p.m. | #10 Loyola Chicago* | #13 | Covelli Center; Columbus, OH | B1G+ | W 3-0 (29-27, 28-26, 25-23) | 1,209 | 19-9 (11-3) |
| 4/15; 5 p.m. | Lindenwood^{(6)} | #11^{(3)} | Covelli Center; Columbus, OH (MIVA Quarterfinals) | B1G+ | W 3-0 (25–23, 25-23, 25-23) | 673 | 20-9 |
| 5/2; 6 p.m. | King | #9 | EagleBank Arena; Fairfax, VA (NCAA First Round) | ESPN+ | W 3-0 (25–20, 25–16, 36–34) | 1,910 | 23-9 |
| 5/2; 7:30 p.m. | #3 Penn State | #9 | EagleBank Arena; Fairfax, VA (NCAA Quarterfinal) | ESPN+ | L 1-3 (22-25, 26-24, 13-25, 24-26) | 2,139 | 23-10 |

*-Indicates conference match.
Times listed are Eastern Time Zone.

== Broadcasters ==
- Central State: Greg Franke
- Penn State: Greg Franke & Hanna Williford
- George Mason: Jon Linney
- Maryville:
- Missouri S&T:
- Princeton:
- Princeton:
- McKendree:
- Lewis:
- Purdue Fort Wayne:
- Loyola Chicago:
- Quincy:
- Lindenwood:
- Charleston:
- BYU:
- BYU:
- Ball State:
- Ball State:
- Penn State:
- Lindenwood:
- Quincy:
- Lewis:
- McKendree:
- Purdue Fort Wayne:
- Loyola Chicago:

== Rankings ==
Ranking movements Legend: ██ Increase in ranking ██ Decrease in ranking RV = Received votes
| | Week | | | | | | | | | | | | | | | | | |
| Poll | Pre | 1 | 2 | 3 | 4 | 5 | 6 | 7 | 8 | 9 | 10 | 11 | 12 | 13 | 14 | 15 | 16 | Final |
|---|---|---|---|---|---|---|---|---|---|---|---|---|---|---|---|---|---|---|
| AVCA Coaches | 13 | 14 | 14 | 13 | 13 | 11 | 10 | 11 | 13 | 15 | 15 | 15 | 13 | 13 | 11 | 11 | 9 | 7 |
| Off the Block Media | Not released | | | | | | RV | RV | | | | | RV | RV | 10 | 9 | | 6 |

^The media did not release a pre-season or Week 1 poll.

== Honors ==
To be filled in upon completion of the season.
