= 2023 Ball State Cardinals men's volleyball team =

American college volleyball season

2023 Ball State Cardinals men's volleyball

MIVA Regular Season Co-Champions
- Conference: Midwestern Intercollegiate Volleyball Association
- Record: 20–9 (11–3 MIVA)
- Head coach: Donan Cruz (2nd season)
- Assistant coaches: Mike Iandolo (2nd season); Christian Rupert (2nd season)
- Home arena: Worthen Arena

2023 Midwestern Intercollegiate Volleyball Association standings
	Conf.				Overall
Team	W		L	PCT	W		L	PCT
No. 13 Loyola Chicago ‍†‍‍	11	–	3	.786	21	–	7	.750
No. 11 Ball State ‍†‍‍	11	–	3	.786	20	–	9	.690
No. 7 Ohio State ‍†‍‡‍^{y}	11	–	3	.786	23	–	10	.697
Lewis ‍‍‍	7	–	7	.500	17	–	13	.567
Purdue Fort Wayne ‍‍‍	7	–	7	.500	16	–	13	.552
Lindenwood ‍‍‍	7	–	7	.500	10	–	13	.435
Quincy ‍‍‍	1	–	13	.071	8	–	19	.296
McKendree ‍‍‍	1	–	13	.071	7	–	16	.304
† – Conference champion ‡ – MIVA tournament champion y – Invited to the NCAA tournament Rankings from AVCA

The 2023 Ball State Cardinals men's volleyball team represented Ball State University in the 2023 NCAA Division I & II men's volleyball season. The Cardinals, led by 2nd year head coach Donan Cruz, played their home games at Worthen Arena. The Cardinals were members of the Midwestern Intercollegiate Volleyball Association and were picked to finish first in the MIVA preseason poll.

== Roster ==
2023 Ball State Cardinals Roster
Defensive Specialist/Libero: 4 Xander Pink – Sophomore; 5 Mason Connor – Freshman; 20 Sammy Adkisson – Senior; 21 Lukas Pytlak – Junior; Middle Blockers: 8 Vanis Buckholz – Sophomore; 11 Felix Egharevba – Graduate; 16 Wil McPhillips – Senior; 19 Eyal Rawitz – Freshman; 22 Anthony Vuksinic – Freshman	Outside Hitters: 2 Kaleb Jenness – Graduate; 7 Trevor Phillips – Junior; 9 Bryce Behrendt – Senior; 12 Ryan Bartz – Freshman; 15 Nathan Goh – Freshman; 18 Tinaishe Ndavazocheca – Sophomore	Opposite Hitters: 3 Keau Thompson – Freshman; 12 Ryan Bartz – Freshman; 14 Dyer Ball – Junior; 17 Aaron Hernandez – Sophomore; 18 Tinaishe Ndavazocheca – Sophomore; Setters: 1 David Flores – Senior; 6 Griffin Satterfield – Freshman; 10 Jakub Wiercinski – Sophomore; 17 Aaron Hernandez – Sophomore

== Schedule ==
Date Time	Opponent	Rank	Arena City (Tournament)	Television	Score	Attendance	Record (MIVA Record)
1/12; 7 p.m.	@ #1 Hawai'i	#6	Stan Sheriff Center; Honolulu, HI	ESPN+	L 1–3 (16–25, 23–25, 25–22, 17–25)	5,581	0–1
1/13; 12 a.m.	@ #1 Hawai'i	#6	Stan Sheriff Center; Honolulu, HI	ESPN+	L 1–3 (25–23, 23–25, 18–25, 18–25)	6,646	0–2
1/20; 7 p.m.	Harvard	#6	Worthen Arena; Muncie, IN	ESPN+	W 3–0 (25–16, 25–18, 25–14)	2,151	1–2
1/21; 7 p.m.	Tusculum	#6	Worthen Arena; Muncie, IN	Ball State All-Access	W 3–2 (25–21, 25–22, 22–25, 24–26, 15–7)	1,237	2–2
1/27; 7 p.m.	Queens	#8	Worthen Arena; Muncie, IN	ESPN+	W 3–0 (25–15, 25–15, 25–15)	1,562	3–2
1/28; 5 p.m.	Sacred Heart	#8	Worthen Arena; Muncie, IN	Ball State All-Access	W 3–0 (25–11, 25–16, 25–21)	1,371	4–2
2/02; 7 p.m.	#11 BYU	#8	Worthen Arena; Muncie, IN	ESPN3	L 1–3 (26–24, 23–25, 21–25, 25–27)	1,567	4–3
2/04; 3 p.m.	#11 BYU	#8	Worthen Arena; Muncie, IN	ESPN3	W 3–1' (24–26, 25–23, 25–19, 25–23)	1,711	5–3
2/09; 7 p.m.	Lewis*	#9	Worthen Arena; Muncie, IN	ESPN+	L 2–3 (22–25, 25–19, 23–25, 25–20, 16–18)	1,100	5–4 (0–1)
2/11; 5 p.m.	McKendree*	#9	Worthen Arena; Muncie, IN	ESPN+	W 3–1 (25–21, 25–23, 23–25, 25–20)	1,242	6–4 (1–1)
2/16; 8 p.m.	@ #13 Loyola Chicago*	#11	Joseph J. Gentile Arena; Chicago, IL	ESPN+	L 1–3 (25–23, 21–25, 21–25, 22–25)	667	6–5 (1–2)
2/18; 7 p.m.	@ Purdue Fort Wayne*	#11	Hilliard Gates Sports Center; Ft. Wayne, IN	ESPN+	W 3–2 (25–20, 24–26, 25–22, 19–25, 15–8)	918	7–5 (2–2)
2/24; 8 p.m.	@ Lindenwood*	#12	Robert F. Hyland Arena; St. Charles, MO	ESPN+	W 3–2 (14–25, 18–25, 25–17, 25–22, 15–8)	312	8–5 (3–2)
2/25; 6 p.m.	@ Quincy*	#12	Pepsi Arena; Quincy, IL	GLVC SN	W 3–0 (25–23, 25–22, 25–22)	563	9–5 (4–2)
3/01; 6 p.m.	Central State	#12	Worthen Arena; Muncie, IN	ESPN+	W 3–0 (25–16, 25–9, 25–19)	423	10–5
3/03; 10 p.m.	@ #4 Long Beach State	#12	Walter Pyramid; Long Beach, CA	ESPN+	L 1–3 (19–25, 17–25, 25–21, 15–25)	1,318	10–6
3/05; 8 p.m.	@ UC San Diego	#12	LionTree Arena; La Jolla, CA	ESPN+	W 3–2 (23–25, 25–19, 25–15, 23–25, 15–12)	301	11–6
3/08; 10 p.m.	@ #5 Grand Canyon	#11	GCU Arena; Phoenix, AZ	ESPN+	L 0–3 (24–26, 23–25, 19–25)	545	11–7
3/15; 7 p.m.	#15 Ohio State*	#12	Worthen Arena; Muncie, IN	ESPN+	W 3–0 (26–24, 25–15, 25–20)	1,350	12–7 (5–2)
3/18; 7 p.m.	@ #15 Ohio State*	#12	Covelli Center; Columbus, OH	B1G+	L 2–3 (25–23, 26–24, 18–25, 24–26, 12–15)	965	12–8 (5–3)
3/24; 7 p.m.	Quincy*	#12	Worthen Arena; Muncie, IN	ESPN+	W 3–1 (25–13, 20–25, 25–19, 25–21)	957	13–8 (6–3)
3/25; 6 p.m.	Lindenwood*	#12	Worthen Arena; Muncie, IN	ESPN+	W 3–0 (25–19, 25–18, 25–17)	981	14–8 (7–3)
3/30; 8 p.m.	@ McKendree*	#12	Melvin Price Convocation Center; Lebanon, IL	GLVC SN	W 3–0 (25–18, 25–21, 25–20)	100	15–8 (8–3)
4/01; 6 p.m.	@ Lewis*	#12	Neil Carey Arena; Romeoville, IL	GLVC SN	W 3–2 (25–22, 25–19, 21–25, 17–25, 15–12)	750	16–8 (9–3)
4/06; 7 p.m.	#10 Loyola Chicago	#11	Worthen Arena; Muncie, IN	ESPN+	W 3–0 (25–21, 25–18, 27–25)	1,124	17–8 (10–3)
4/08; 7 p.m.	Purdue Fort Wayne	#11	Worthen Arena; Muncie, IN	ESPN+	W 3–0 (25–17, 25–17, 25–22)	1,211	18–8 (11–3)
4/15; 6 p.m.	Quincy^{(8)}	#10^{(1)}	Worthen Arena (MIVA Quarterfinals)	ESPN+	W 3–0 (25–20, 25–19, 25–15)	757	19–8 (12–3)
4/19; 7 p.m.	Lewis^{(4)}	#10^{(1)}	Worthen Arena (MIVA Semifinals)	ESPN+	W 3–0 (25–21, 25–21, 25–18)	1,456	20–8 (13–3)

*-Indicates conference match.
Times listed are Eastern Time Zone.

== Broadcasters ==
- Hawai'i: Kanoa Leahey, Chris McLachlin, & Ryan Tsuji
- Hawai'i: Kanoa Leahey, Chris McLachlin, & Ryan Tsuji
- Harvard: Joey Lindstrom, Amber Seaman, & Madison Surface
- Tusculum: No commentary
- Queens:
- Sacred Heart: No commentary
- BYU: Lexi Eblen & Hudson French
- BYU: Mick Tidrow, Amber Seaman, & Madison Surface
- Lewis:
- McKendree:
- Loyola Chicago:
- Purdue Fort Wayne:
- Lindenwood:
- Quincy:
- Central State:
- Long Beach State:
- UC San Diego:
- Grand Canyon:
- Ohio State:
- Ohio State:
- Quincy:
- Lindenwood:
- McKendree:
- Lewis:
- Loyola Chicago:
- Purdue Fort Wayne:

== Rankings ==
Ranking movements Legend: ██ Increase in ranking ██ Decrease in ranking RV = Received votes
	Week																	
Poll	Pre	1	2	3	4	5	6	7	8	9	10	11	12	13	14	15	16	Final
AVCA Coaches	6	6	6	8	8	9	11	12	12	11	12	12	12	11	10	10	11	11
Off the Block Media	Not released		9	8	9	8	10	RV	RV	RV	RV			RV	8	8		9

^The Media did not release a pre-season poll.

== Honors ==
To be filled in upon competition of the season.
