= 2023 Loyola Ramblers men's volleyball team =

American college volleyball season

2023 Loyola Ramblers men's volleyball

MIVA Regular Season Co-Champions
- Conference: Midwestern Intercollegiate Volleyball Association
- Record: 21-7 (11–3 MIVA)
- Head coach: John Hawks (1st season)
- Assistant coaches: Ali'i Keohohou (1st season); Scott Kevorken (1st season)
- Home arena: Joseph J. Gentile Arena

2023 Midwestern Intercollegiate Volleyball Association standings
	Conf.				Overall
Team	W		L	PCT	W		L	PCT
No. 13 Loyola Chicago ‍†‍‍	11	–	3	.786	21	–	7	.750
No. 11 Ball State ‍†‍‍	11	–	3	.786	20	–	9	.690
No. 7 Ohio State ‍†‍‡‍^{y}	11	–	3	.786	23	–	10	.697
Lewis ‍‍‍	7	–	7	.500	17	–	13	.567
Purdue Fort Wayne ‍‍‍	7	–	7	.500	16	–	13	.552
Lindenwood ‍‍‍	7	–	7	.500	10	–	13	.435
Quincy ‍‍‍	1	–	13	.071	8	–	19	.296
McKendree ‍‍‍	1	–	13	.071	7	–	16	.304
† – Conference champion ‡ – 2023 MIVA Tournament champion y- Invited to the NCAA Volleyball Tournament; Rankings from AVCA

The 2023 Loyola Ramblers men's volleyball team represented Loyola University Chicago in the 2023 NCAA Division I & II men's volleyball season. The Ramblers, led by first year head coach John Hawks, played their home games at Joseph J. Gentile Arena. The Ramblers are members of the Midwestern Intercollegiate Volleyball Association and were picked to finish second in the MIVA in the preseason poll.

== Roster ==
2023 Loyola Ramblers roster
Defensive specialist/libero: 3 JJ Sowa - Freshman; 12 Matt Oakley - Junior; Middle blockers: 2 Justin Ross - (redshirt) Sophomore; 17 Nicodemus Meyer - Sophomore; 18 Jimmy Meinhart - Junior; 21 Brad Bell - Freshman	Outside hitters: 1 Cole Schlothauer - (redshirt) Senior; 6 Bryce Robbins - Freshman; 7 Vanja Petrasinovic - Freshman; 8 Jack Yentz - (redshirt) Junior; 10 Cooper Evans - Freshman; 13 Colton Brooks - (redshirt) Junior; 14 Parker Van Buren - (redshirt) Sophomore; 15 Josh Gottlieb- (redshirt) Sophomore; 20 Evan Markworth - Sophomore; 24 Nick Martinski - Graduate	Opposite hitters: 15 Josh Gottlieb - (redshirt) Sophomore; 16 Jonathan Drysdale-Anderson - Junior; 23 Miller Trubey - Freshman; Setters: 9 Ryan McElligott - Freshman; 11 Brian Voight - (redshirt) Junior; 19 Dan Mangun - (redshirt) Sophomore

== Schedule ==
Date time	Opponent	Rank	Arena city (tournament)	Television	Score	Attendance	Record (MIVA Record)
1/09; 6 p.m.	Missouri S&T	#12	Joseph J. Gentile Arena; Chicago, IL	ESPN+	W 3–0 (25–17, 25–17, 27–25)	281	1–0
1/12; 3 p.m.	King	#12	Joseph J. Gentile Arena; Chicago, IL	ESPN+	W 3–0 (25–20, 25–20, 25–18)	177	2–0
1/13; 7 p.m.	UC San Diego	#12	Joseph J. Gentile Arena; Chicago, IL	NBCS CHIC	W 3–0 (25–20, 26-24, 25–18)	1,403	3-0
1/20; 6 p.m.	@ NJIT	#11	Health and Wellness Center; Newark, NJ	ESPN+	W 3–0 (25–21, 25-19, 25–19)	355	4-0
1/21; 6 p.m.	@ LIU	#11	Steinberg Wellness Center; Brooklyn, NY	NEC Front Row	W 3–1 (24-26, 25-21, 25–20, 25-20)	176	5-0
1/27; 7 p.m.	Maryville	#11	Joseph J. Gentile Arena; Chicago, IL	ESPN+	W 3–1 (25-8, 25-13, 21–25, 32-30)	552	6-0
1/28; 6 p.m.	St. Francis Brooklyn	#11	Joseph J. Gentile Arena; Chicago, IL	ESPN+	W 3–0 (25-20, 25-14, 25-19)	555	7-0
2/02; 9 p.m.	@ Concordia Irvine	#12	CU Arena; Irvine, CA	EagleEye	L 1-3 (22-25, 16-25, 25-22, 21-25)	120	7-1
2/03; 9 p.m.	@ #3 Long Beach State	#12	Walter Pyramid; Long Beach, CA	ESPN+	L 2-3 (25-23, 21-25, 19-25, 25-23, 15-17)	1,598	7-2
2/10; 7 p.m.	@ Quincy	#13	Pepsi Arena; Quincy, IL	GLVC SN	W 3–0 (25-18, 25-21, 25-19)	245	8-2 (1-0)
2/11; 7 p.m.	@ Lindenwood	#13	Robert F. Hyland Arena; St. Charles, MO	ESPN+	W 3-2 (25-22, 25-23, 17-25, 28-30, 15-12)	164	9-2 (2-0)
2/16; 7 p.m.	#11 Ball State*	#13	Joseph J. Gentile Arena; Chicago, IL	ESPN+	W 3–1 (23-25, 25-21, 25-21, 25-22)	667	10-2 (3-0)
2/18; 7 p.m.	#10 Ohio State*	#13	Joseph J. Gentile Arena; Chicago, IL	NBCS CHIC	W 3–0 (25-20, 25-21, 25-18)	1,206	11-2 (4-0)
2/22; 7 p.m.	@ Lewis*	#10	Neil Carey Arena; Romeoville, IL	GLVC SN	W 3–1 (27-25, 25-19, 19-25, 25-22)	700	12-2 (5-0)
2/25; 5 p.m.	McKendree*	#10	Joseph J. Gentile Arena; Chicago, IL	ESPN+	W 3–1 (25-23, 21-25, 25-21, 25-14)	749	13-2 (6-0)
3/04; 7 p.m.	Purdue Fort Wayne	#9	Joseph J. Gentile Arena; Chicago, IL	ESPN+	W 3–2 (22-25, 25-21, 25-17, 21-25, 15-12)	592	14-2 (7-0)
3/07; 7 p.m.	Queens	#9	Joseph J. Gentile Arena; Chicago, IL	ESPN+	W 3–0 (25-20, 25-19, 26-24)	232	15-2
3/10; 6 p.m.	@ McKendree*	#9	Melvin Price Convocation Center; Lebanon, IL	GLVC SN	W 3–2 (20-25, 26-28, 25-22, 25-22, 15-13)	167	16-2 (8-0)
3/16; 6 p.m.	#14 Charleston	#9	Joseph J. Gentile Arena; Chicago, IL	ESPN+	W 3–1 (25-14, 16-25, 25-21, 25-16)	731	17-2
3/18; 6 p.m.	@ Purdue Fort Wayne*	#9	Hilliard Gates Sports Center; Ft. Wayne, IN	ESPN+	L 2-3 (18-25, 25-27, 25-23, 25-20, 12-15)	570	17-3 (8-1)
3/23; 7 p.m.	Lewis*	#9	Joseph J. Gentile Arena; Chicago, IL	ESPN+	W 3–0 (25-22, 25-20, 25-20)	805	18-3 (9-1)
3/25; 7 p.m.	vs. Princeton	#9	Recreation Athletic Complex; Fairfax, VA (EIVA/A10 Challenge)		L 1-3 (30-28, 16-25, 23-25, 29-31)	0	18-4
3/26; 2 p.m.	@ George Mason	#9	Recreation Athletic Complex; Fairfax, VA (EIVA/A10 Challenge)	ESPN+	W 3-2 (25-23, 18-25, 25-21, 27-29, 17-15)	455	19-4
3/31; 7 p.m.	Lindenwood*	#10	Joseph J. Gentile Arena; Chicago, IL	ESPN+	W 3-0 (26-24, 25-20, 25-23)	820	20-4 (10-1)
4/01; 5 p.m.	Quincy*	#10	Joseph J. Gentile Arena; Chicago, IL	ESPN+	W 3-2 (25-16, 25-23, 23-25, 23-25, 15-7)	719	21-4 (11-1)
4/06; 6 p.m.	@ #11 Ball State*	#10	Worthen Arena; Muncie, IN	ESPN+	L 0-3 (21-25, 18-25, 25-27)	1,124	21-5 (11-2)
4/08; 4 p.m.	@ #13 Ohio State*	#10	Covelli Center; Columbus, OH	ESPN+	L 0-3 (27-29, 26-28, 23-25)	1,209	21-6 (11-3)
4/15; 7 p.m.	McKendree^{(7)}	#12^{(2)}	Joseph J. Gentile Arena; Chicago, IL (MIVA Quarterfinals)		L 2-3 (25–19, 23-25, 20-25, 25-20, 12-15)	598	21-7

*-Indicates conference match.
Times listed are Central Time Zone.

== Broadcasters ==
- Missouri S&T: Scott Sudikoff & Ray Gooden
- King: Scott Sudikoff & Ray Gooden
- UC San Diego: Ray Gooden & Henry Payne
- NJIT: Ira Thor
- LIU:
- Maryville:
- St. Francis Brooklyn:
- Concordia Irvine:
- Long Beach State:
- Quincy:
- Lindenwood:
- Ball State:
- Ohio State:
- Lewis:
- McKendree:
- Purdue Fort Wayne:
- Queens:
- McKendree:
- Charleston:
- Purdue Fort Wayne:
- Lewis:
- George Mason:
- Lindenwood:
- Quincy:
- Ball State:
- Ohio State:

== Rankings ==
Ranking movements Legend: ██ Increase in ranking ██ Decrease in ranking RV = Received votes
	Week																	
Poll	Pre	1	2	3	4	5	6	7	8	9	10	11	12	13	14	15	16	Final
AVCA Coaches	12	12	11	11	12	13	13	10	9	9	9	9	10	10	12	13	13	13
Off the Block Media	Not released		10	10	10	RV	RV	7	8	RV	7	9	9	8	RV	RV		RV

^The Media did not release a Pre-season or Week 1 poll.
