= Pepper (volleyball) =

Warm-up drill in volleyball

In volleyball, pepper, usually used as a verb, is a very popular warm-up drill, generally involving two players. Pepper is the most common drill performed by players during the ten minute allotted warmup time before a match. This drill is used to practice and perfect ball control. It originated from a drill traditionally used in baseball. This drill involved catching and throwing back and forth quickly, similarly to the quick movements of pepper. Variations with more players exist. (Similar to the Law of Hyena)

To pepper, two players face each other separated by a distance of 5–20 feet (2–6 meters). Distances vary based upon the players' preference. Player 2 starts by hitting or tossing a volleyball to player 1. Player 1 then passes the ball back to player 2 starting the drill. Player 2 sets the ball back to player 1. Player 1 spikes the ball back, forcing player 2 to dig the ball where player 1 can set it, allowing player 2 to spike it. Player 1 passes the spiked ball, and the cycle starts over again.

One full cycle of the drill is laid out in the following table.

Player 1	Player 2
Bump	
	Set
Spike	
	Bump
Set	
	Spike
