= Lebanon Historic District (Lebanon, Illinois) =

Archaeological site in Illinois, United States

- U.S. National Register of Historic Places
- U.S. Historic district
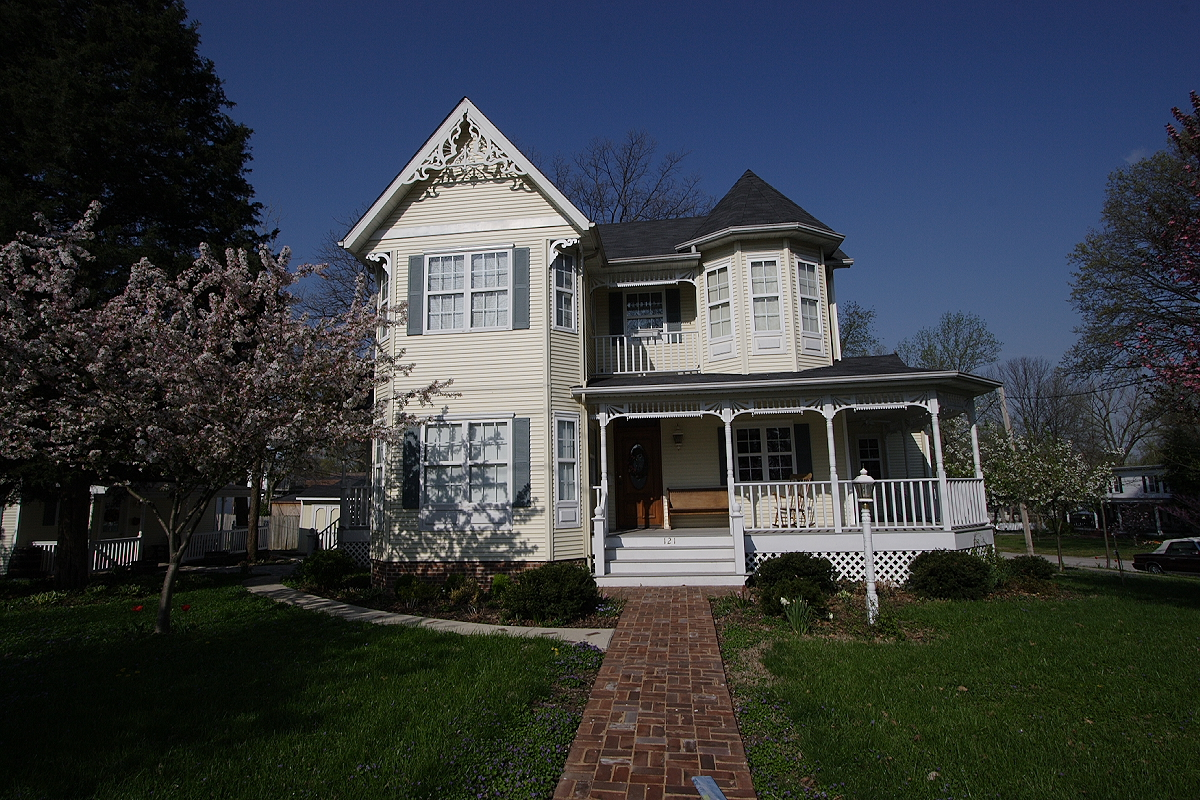
- A restored Victorian home in the Lebanon Historic District.

- Location within Illinois Location within the United States
- Location: Irregular pattern centered along St. Louis and Belleville Sts., Lebanon, Illinois
- Coordinates: 38°36′12″N 89°48′41″W
- Area: 129 acres (52 ha)
- NRHP reference No.: 78003113
- Added to NRHP: October 4, 1978

The Lebanon Historic District is a historic district composed of the areas of Lebanon, Illinois, developed prior to 1900. The district includes five distinct areas of Lebanon: the city's main commercial district, the neighborhood around McKendree University, two residential districts, and an archaeological site at the city limits. Development in Lebanon began in the 1820s, and McKendree University was founded in 1828. The oldest building from this period, the Mermaid House Hotel, is a Federal structure dating to 1830. The city received an influx of German immigrants from the 1830s onward, which affected the city's development. In the 1850s and 1860s, a railroad opened in the city and several local industries developed; however, the city retained the character of a small college town and never developed into an industrial or trade center.

The historic district was added to the National Register of Historic Places on October 4, 1978.
