= Ohio State Buckeyes men's volleyball =

American college volleyball team

- Founded: 1968
- University: Ohio State University
- Athletic director: Ross Bjork
- Head coach: Kevin Burch (7th season)
- Conference: MIVA
- Location: Columbus, Ohio, US
- Home arena: Covelli Center (capacity: 3,700)
- Nickname: Buckeyes
- Colors: Scarlet and Gray

AIAW/NCAA tournament champion
- 2011, 2016, 2017

AIAW/NCAA tournament runner-up
- 1977, 2000

AIAW/NCAA tournament appearance
- 1975, 1976, 1977, 1978, 1980, 1981, 1982, 1983, 1986, 1987, 1993, 1997, 2000, 2001, 2005, 2007, 2008, 2009, 2010, 2011, 2016, 2017, 2018, 2023, 2024

Conference tournament champion
- 1969, 1981, 1982, 1983, 1986, 1987, 1993, 2000, 2001, 2005, 2008, 2009, 2010, 2011, 2016, 2017, 2018, 2023, 2024

Conference regular season champion
- 1969, 1972, 1975, 1976, 1977, 1978, 1981, 1982, 1983, 1986, 1987, 1993, 1995, 1996, 1998, 1999, 2000, 2007, 2008, 2009, 2010, 2011, 2012, 2016, 2017, 2018, 2023

The Ohio State Buckeyes men's volleyball is one of the 18 men's varsity teams at Ohio State University in Columbus, Ohio. The team is coached by Kevin Burch, who is in his seventh season as head coach. The Buckeyes are a charter member of the Midwestern Intercollegiate Volleyball Association (MIVA), which they have been competing in since their founding in 1968. The team has won 27 regular season MIVA titles, 19 tournament titles and three NCAA men's volleyball tournament titles. They currently host their home matches at the Covelli Center on campus.

== Arena ==
The Buckeyes play their home matches at the Covelli Center on campus. They began playing at the arena in 2020, after having spent more than 50 season at St. John Arena. Their first match at the Covelli Center was played on January 4, 2020, against North Greenville University, which they won 3–0 (25–17, 27–25, 25–19). The game was attended by 1,169 fans.

Ohio State has hosted the NCAA men's volleyball tournament six times: in 1978, 1983, 1997, 2007, and 2017 in St. John Arena; and in 2021 at the Covelli Center.

== Seasons ==
- 1969: In only their second year, the Buckeyes finished a perfect 24–0, claiming their first conference title.
- 1975: Ohio State made their first NCAA Tournament appearance after going 19–2. They lost to UCLA in four sets before beating Yale to claim third place.
- 1977: The Buckeyes finally made the NCAA Tournament Finals by defeating Pepperdine in four sets. They went on to fall to USC to claim National Runner-up.
- 2011: After 16 previous attempts, the Buckeyes finally claimed their first National Title by defeating Penn State and UC Santa Barbara.
- 2016: By winning three games, the Buckeyes won their second title. They defeated George Mason, UCLA, and BYU. Miles Johnson was named the Most Outstanding Player for the tournament.
- 2017: In front of a home crowd, the Buckeyes won their second straight, and third overall National Championship. They defeated Hawaii and BYU in the tournament. Nicolas Szerszen was named Most Outstanding Player.

== Yearly records ==
Season	Coach	Overall	Conference	Standing	Postseason
Karl Dunlap (Midwestern Intercollegiate Volleyball Association) (1968–1971)
1968	Karl Dunlap	17–6		3rd	
1969	Karl Dunlap	24–0	10–0	1st	
1970	Karl Dunlap	16–2	8–2	2nd	
1971	Karl Dunlap	17–7–1	5–5	3rd	
Karl Dunlap:		74–15–1	23–7		
Doug Beal (Midwestern Intercollegiate Volleyball Association) (1972–1974)
1972	Doug Beal	20–3	11–1	1st	
1973	Doug Beal	16–5		3rd	
1974	Doug Beal	16–7	9–3	3rd	
Doug Beal:		52–15	20–4		
Taras Liskevych (Midwestern Intercollegiate Volleyball Association) (1975–1976)
1975	Taras Liskevych	21–3		1st	NCAA Tournament Third Place
1976	Taras Liskevych	16–5		1st	NCAA Tournament Third Place
Taras Liskevych:		45–7			
Suguru Furuichi (Midwestern Intercollegiate Volleyball Association) (1977–1978)
1977	Suguru Furuichi	28–4	12–0	1st	NCAA Tournament Runner-up
1978	Suguru Furuichi	32–3	12–0	1st	NCAA Tournament Third Place
Suguru Furuichi:		60–7	24–0		
Doug Tegtmeier (Midwestern Intercollegiate Volleyball Association) (1979–1979)
1979	Doug Tegtmeier	26–11	12–2	2nd	
Doug Tegtmeier:		26–11	12–2		
Bob Yoder (Midwestern Intercollegiate Volleyball Association) (1980–1981)
1980	Bob Yoder	30–5		2nd	NCAA Tournament Third Place
1981	Bob Yoder	29–5		1st	NCAA Tournament Fourth Place
Bob Yoder:		59–10			
Jim Smoot (Midwestern Intercollegiate Volleyball Association) (1982–1984)
1982	Jim Smoot	30–8	5–1	1st	NCAA Tournament Fourth Place
1983	Jim Smoot	28–11–2	8–0	1st	NCAA Tournament Third Place
1984	Jim Smoot	25–8	5–1	2nd	
Jim Smoot:		83–27–2	18–2		
Pete Hanson (Midwestern Intercollegiate Volleyball Association) (1985–2019)
1985	Pete Hanson	16–13	4–2	2nd	
1986	Pete Hanson	25–15		1st	NCAA Tournament Fourth Place
1987	Pete Hanson	18–21		1st	NCAA Tournament Fourth Place
1988	Pete Hanson	23–12	4–2	2nd	
1989	Pete Hanson	11–19	3–3	3rd	
1990	Pete Hanson	8–24	2–4	3rd	
1991	Pete Hanson	16–12	3–3	t-2nd	
1992	Pete Hanson	12–18	2–4	3rd	
1993	Pete Hanson	28–10	5–1	t-1st	NCAA Tournament Fourth Place
1994	Pete Hanson	20–13	6–4	3rd	
1995	Pete Hanson	18–12	10–2	t-1st	
1996	Pete Hanson	23–7	12–2	t-1st	
1997	Pete Hanson	19–9	10–6	4th	
1998	Pete Hanson	25–2	10–0	1st	
1999	Pete Hanson	21–6	12–2	t-1st	
2000	Pete Hanson	25–4	13–1	1st	NCAA Tournament Runner-up
2001	Pete Hanson	22–6	13–3	2nd	NCAA Tournament Semifinals
2002	Pete Hanson	21–9	13–3	3rd	
2003	Pete Hanson	18–10	13–3	t-3rd	
2004	Pete Hanson	21–9	13–3	1st	
2005	Pete Hanson	24–8	14–2	2nd	NCAA Tournament Semifinals
2006	Pete Hanson	20–12	7–5	4th	
2007	Pete Hanson	23–4	10–2	1st	
2008	Pete Hanson	20–8	11–1	1st	NCAA Tournament Semifinals
2009	Pete Hanson	16–11	9–1	1st	NCAA Tournament Semifinals
2010	Pete Hanson	22–8	11–1	1st	NCAA Tournament Semifinals
2011	Pete Hanson	26–6	11–1	1st	NCAA Tournament Champions
2012	Pete Hanson	21–9	9–3	t-1st	
2013	Pete Hanson	19–8	9–5	t-3rd	
2014	Pete Hanson	11–16	6–8	5th	
2015	Pete Hanson	22–9	11–5	3rd	
2016	Pete Hanson	31–2	15–1	1st	NCAA Tournament Champions
2017	Pete Hanson	32–2	16–0	1st	NCAA Tournament Champions
2018	Pete Hanson	25–6	11–3	t-1st	NCAA Tournament Semifinals
2019	Pete Hanson	10–19	5–9	t-6th	
Pete Hanson:		712–359	300–95		
Kevin Burch (Midwestern Intercollegiate Volleyball Association) (2020–present)
2020	Kevin Burch	11–8	2–5	7th	
2021	Kevin Burch	9–10	8–6	t-4th	
2022	Kevin Burch	13–14	7–7	t-4th	
2023	Kevin Burch	22–9	11–3	t-1st	NCAA Tournament Quarterfinals
2024	Kevin Burch	22–9	11–5	3rd	NCAA Tournament Quarterfinals
2025	Kevin Burch	18–11	11–5	t-3rd	
2026	Kevin Burch	14–12	9–7	t-4th	
Kevin Burch:		109–73	59–38		
Total:		1,220–524–3			
National champion Postseason invitational champion Conference regular season champion Conference regular season and conference tournament champion Division regular season champion Division regular season and conference tournament champion Conference tournament champion

== Coaches ==
No.	Coach	Seasons	Record	MIVA Titles	MIVA Tourney	NCAA Apps	NCAA Titles
1	Karl Dunlap	1968–1971	74–15–1 (.828)	1	1	0	0
2	Doug Beal	1972–1974	52–15–0 (.776)	1	0	0	0
3	Taras Liskevych	1975–1976	45–7–0 (.885)	2	0	2	0
4	Suguru Furuichi	1977–1978	60–7–0 (.896)	2	0	2	0
5	Doug Tegtmeier	1979	26–11–0 (.702)	0	0	0	0
6	Bob Yoder	1980–1981	59–10–0 (.855)	1	1	2	0
7	Jim Smoot	1982–1984	83–27–2 (.750)	2	2	2	0
8	Pete Hanson	1985–2019	712–359–0 (.665)	18	13	15	3
9	Kevin Burch	2020–present	109–73–0 (.599)	1	2	2	0
