= Emerald Mound and Village Site =

Archaeological site in Illinois, United States

- Emerald Mounds and Village Site
- U.S. National Register of Historic Places
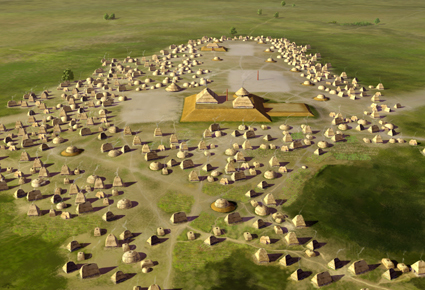
- Artists conception of the site

- Location within Illinois Location within the United States
- Location: Northwest of the junction of Emerald Mound Grange and Midgley Neiss Rd., Lebanon, Illinois
- Coordinates: 38°37′50″N 89°47′9″W
- Area: 145 acres (59 ha)
- NRHP reference No.: 71001026
- Added to NRHP: October 26, 1971

The Emerald Mound and Village Site (Emerald Site) is a pre-Columbian archaeological site located northwest of the junction of Emerald Mound Grange and Midgley Neiss Roads in St. Clair County, Illinois. The site includes five mounds, two of which have been destroyed by modern activity, and the remains of a village. Middle Mississippian peoples inhabited the village, which was a satellite village of Cahokia. The largest of the mounds is a two-tiered structure that stands 50 feet (15 m) high; its square base is 300 feet (91 m) across, while its upper tier is 150 feet (46 m) across. At the time of its discovery, the mound was the second-largest known in Illinois after Monks Mound at Cahokia.

The site was added to the National Register of Historic Places on October 26, 1971.
