= St. John Arena =

Multi-purpose arena in Columbus, Ohio, United States

- St. John
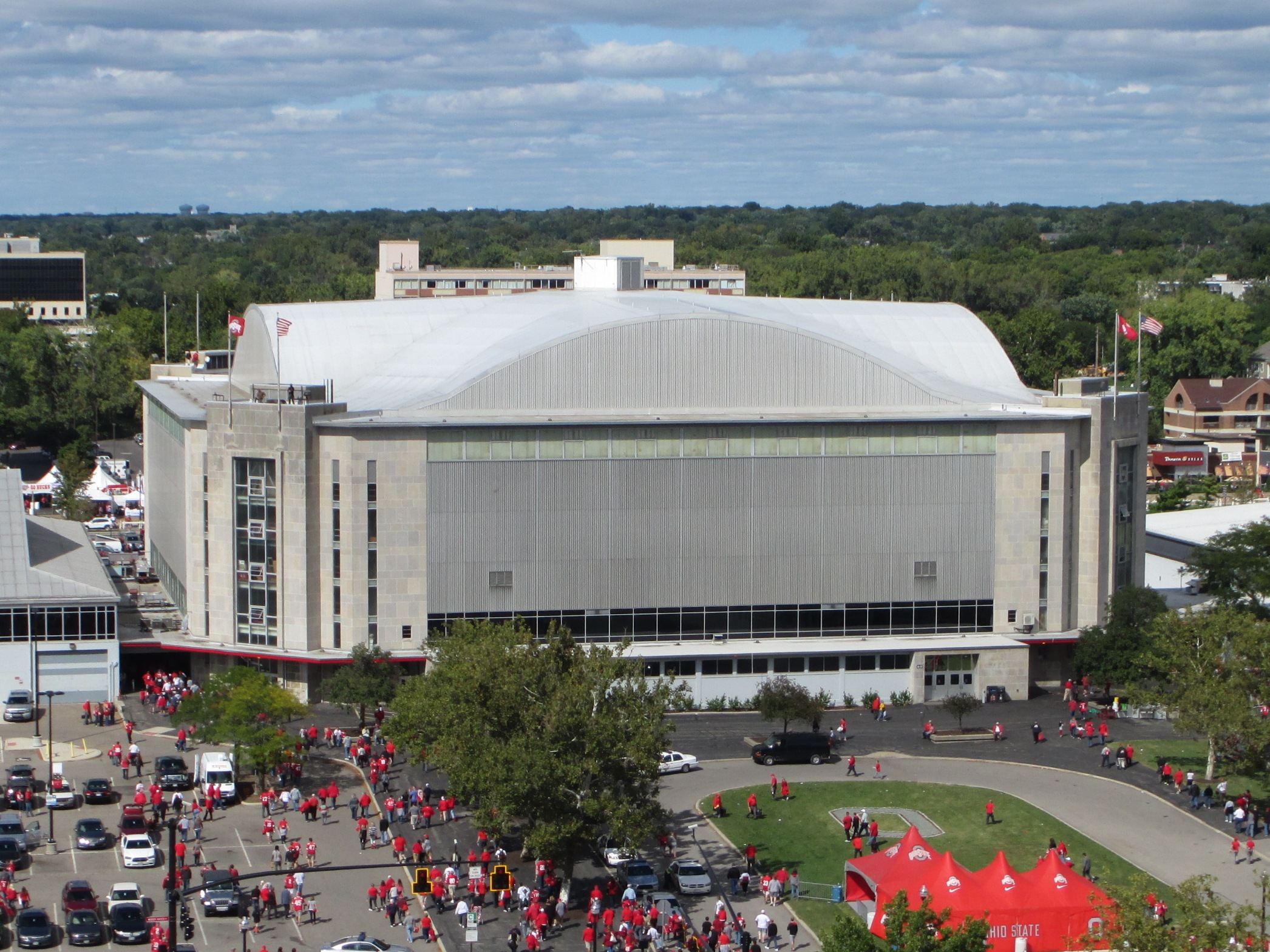
- Exterior view in 2014
- Interactive map of St. John Arena
- Location: 410 Woody Hayes Dr; Columbus, OH 43210
- Coordinates: 40°0′19″N 83°1′8″W
- Owner: Ohio State University
- Operator: Ohio State University Department of Athletics
- Capacity: 13,276 (basketball)
- Public transit: 1 CABS; CoGo

Construction
- Opened: November 1956
- Cost: $4 million (approximate)

Tenants
- Ohio State Buckeyes (NCAA); Men's basketball 1956–1998; Men's gymnastics 1956–2019; Wrestling 1956–2019; Women's basketball 1965–1998; Men's volleyball 1968–2019; Women's gymnastics 1970–2019; Women's volleyball 1971–2018

St. John Arena is a multi-purpose arena on the campus of Ohio State University in Columbus, Ohio, United States. The arena was named for Lynn St. John, who served as Ohio State's men's basketball coach and athletic director until 1947. It was designed by Howard Dwight Smith, architect of Ohio Stadium. It opened in 1956 to serve as the home of multiple Buckeye athletic teams, primarily the men's basketball team. Prior to its construction, the men's basketball team played off-campus in the Fairgrounds Coliseum at the state fairgrounds. St. John Arena served as home of the men's and women's basketball teams until it was replaced by Value City Arena in 1998, while the remaining tenants moved to the Covelli Center in 2019. It is currently occupied by the men’s and women’s track and field teams and their lifting floor, locker, equipment, and athletic training rooms as the school awaits funding for a new indoor track facility. The arena is also used before every OSU football home game for The Ohio State University Marching Band's Skull Session.

== History ==
Located on north campus between Woody Hayes Drive and Lane Avenue, the 13,276-seat arena was built in 1956. During the time it was the home court of the Ohio State Buckeyes men's basketball team, it saw the Buckeyes win the 1960 National Championship and five straight Big Ten titles from 1960 to 1964 under coach Fred Taylor. The men's and women's basketball teams moved to their current home, Value City Arena at the Jerome Schottenstein Center, in 1998. The arena housed the school's men's and women's volleyball teams, men's and women's gymnastics teams, and wrestling squad until 2018. It also hosted the annual Buckeye Classic women's basketball tournament.

Concerts by popular musical artists were held at the arena from 1971 to 1980.

In 2004, St. John Arena hosted its first men's basketball game in six years because of a scheduling conflict at the Schottenstein Center. St. John Arena was again used for men's basketball on March 24, 2008, when the Buckeyes hosted an NIT game against the California Golden Bears. The Buckeyes eventually took the 2008 NIT title.

The most popular event still held at the arena is the Skull Session, the pep rally before football games. Two hours prior to kickoff, the Ohio State University Marching Band performs Buckeye favorites, and the players and coaches speak to the crowd. With roots back to 1932, the Skull Session sometimes features the visiting team's marching band or local high school bands as well. Many fans arrive hours early to obtain seating for this Ohio State tradition.

St. John Arena is used for Freshmen Convocation, at which the entire freshman class meets for the first time and university leaders initiate the freshmen.

== Possible demolition ==
Plans to demolish St. John were announced in November 2012, with the arena being replaced by Covelli Center; however, in 2016, the university's associate vice president for planning and real estate said that the arena is unlikely to be demolished in the foreseeable future.

Panoramic view of St. John Arena
