= Mermaid House Hotel =

- U.S. National Register of Historic Places
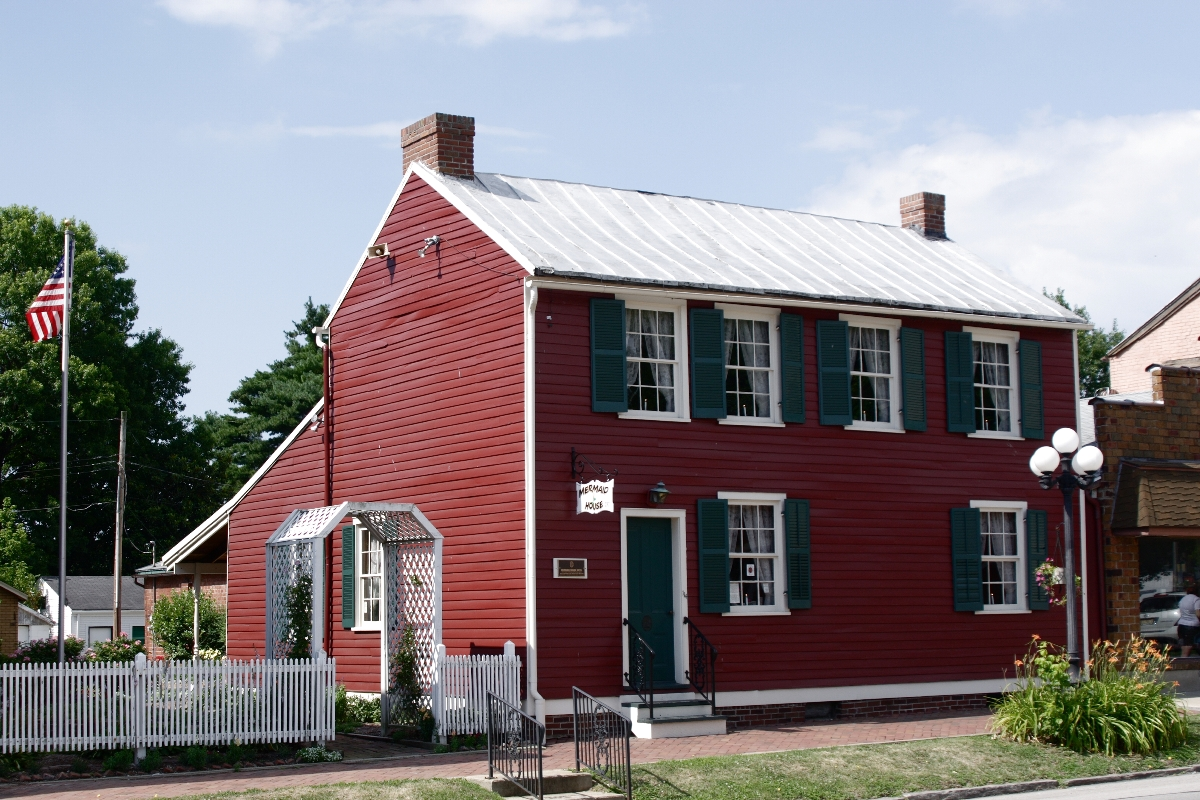

- Location within Illinois Location within the United States
- Location: 114 E. St. Louis St., Lebanon, Illinois
- Coordinates: 38°36′13.5″N 89°48′24.6″W
- Built: 1830
- Architect: Lyman Adams
- NRHP reference No.: 75002078
- Added to NRHP: December 4, 1975

Mermaid House Hotel, located on East St. Louis Street in Lebanon, Illinois, was built in 1830 by the retired New England sea captain Lyman Adams. He named it for the mermaids he reported seeing at sea.

The Mermaid House was visited by Charles Dickens in 1842 and received a mention in his book American Notes.

The public-house was so very clean and good a one, that the managers of the jaunt resolved to return to it and put up there for the night, if possible. This course decided on, and the horses being well refreshed, we again pushed forward, and came upon the Prairie at sunset.

Returning to Lebanon that night, we lay at the little inn at which we had halted in the afternoon. In point of cleanliness and comfort it would have suffered by no comparison with any English alehouse, of a homely kind, in England.

The Mermaid House was added to the National Register of Historic Places on December 4, 1975.
