= Midwest Intercollegiate Volleyball Association =

MIVA logo.

The Midwest Intercollegiate Volleyball Association (MIVA) is a collegiate club men's volleyball sports league in the Midwest United States. It is differentiated from the varsity Midwestern Intercollegiate Volleyball Association (also called "MIVA").

== Conference schools ==
The conference schools are divided into NCAA Division 1 and Division 2 schools.

=== Division 1 ===
These teams are divided into the following three divisions:

==== Big Ten Men's Volleyball Association (BTMVA) ====
- University of Illinois
- Indiana University
- University of Iowa
- University of Michigan
- Michigan State University
- University of Minnesota
- Northwestern University
- Ohio State University
- Purdue University
- University of Wisconsin

==== Midwest 10 Volleyball Conference ====
- Ball State University
- Illinois State University
- Iowa State University
- Lakeland University
- Marquette University
- Northern Illinois University
- UIC
- University of Notre Dame
- UWM (Milwaukee)
- University of Wisconsin–Oshkosh

==== Great Midwest Men's Volleyball Conference (GMMVC) ====
- Bowling Green State University
- Central Michigan University
- University of Cincinnati
- University of Dayton
- Kent State University
- University of Kentucky
- Miami University
- Ohio University
- Ohio Northern University
- University of Toledo

=== Division 2 ===
- Earlham College
- Eastern Illinois University
- Grand Valley State University
- Illinois-B
- Indiana-B
- Miami U-B
- Michigan-B
- Michigan State-White
- Ohio State-2
- Rose-Hulman Institute of Technology
- University of Wisconsin–Oshkosh-2
- Wabash College
- Wittenberg University
- Wright State University
- Xavier University
