= Volleyball drills =

Volleyball drills are specialized exercises that enhance teams and players volleyball skills. There are numerous volleyball drills that teams and players can utilize in order to improve and further develop their skills in all areas of the game such as passing, serving, attacking, setting, blocking, and digging. From beginners to well-seasoned players, drills can help all players gain repetitions in various skills and positions; the more repetitions, the better a player can become.

== Serving drills ==
“Around the World” is a serving drill, and its purpose is for players to practice serving to the six different zones on the court. Being able to serve and target any area on the court is a valuable skill to have, especially when playing an opponent.

=== Rules of “Around the World” ===
1. Split the volleyball team in half into two teams, half of the team goes to one side of the court, and the other half goes to the opposite side of the court.
2. Each team will then designate one person to sit in zone 1 on the side of the court they will be serving the ball to.
3. The teams will then serve to zone 1 on the court in order for their teammate sitting in zone 1 to catch the ball.
4. Once the teammate that is sitting on the court has caught the volleyball, they will run to the other side of the court where the team is, and a different teammate will run to the other side of the court and sit in zone 2.
5. Repeat the steps above until the teammate sitting in zone 2 has caught the ball. Continue these steps through zone 6 on the court.
6. The first team to serve all six zones on the court and have their teammates catch the ball in those areas wins the drill.

== Serve-receive/passing drills ==
Servers vs. Passers is a drill that gives teams the opportunity to practice their serve-receive skills. The goal of this drill is to improve the skills of passers and encourage aggressive serving.

=== Rules of "Servers vs. Passers" ===
1. Select three players on the team to be passers. The passers will go to areas 1, 6, and 5 on one side of the court.
2. Select a target to be in the setter position, area 2, on the court.
3. The rest of the players will be the servers on the opposite side of the court from the passers. The servers will serve to the other side of the court.
4. The passers will pass the served balls to the target in the setter position.
5. The goal of the drill is to pass directly to the target in the setter position within a one-foot radius of the target. If the passers can pass the served ball within a one-foot radius of the target, this is considered a “good” pass and the passers will get a point.
6. If the passers cannot pass the ball within a one-foot radius of the target or the server gets an ace, the servers will get a point. The first group (either servers or passers) to get to ten points (or any point value you choose) will win the drill.

== Setting drills ==
A popular setting drill is called the “Front-Back Challenge." The purpose of this drill is for the setter to feel comfortable adjusting to last minute directions on where to set the ball, as well as practice consistently setting the ball to any of the front row hitters: outside, middle, and right side.

=== Rules of "Front-Back Challenge" ===
1. A setter goes to zone 2.
2. Have players stand in as targets in the outside hitter position, middle hitter position, and right side hitter position.
3. The coach tosses balls to the setter (or a passer passes to the setter).
4. The coach yells out “front” or “back” before the ball reaches the setter. If “front” is called out, the setter must set the ball in front of him/herself to either the middle hitter or outside hitter. If “back” is called out, the setter must back set the ball to the right side hitter.
5. Have the setter complete 30 set balls in the correct direction.

== Blocking drills ==
Blocking is a key component in the game of volleyball, and is the first line of defense against an attack. A drill that allows players to work on their blocking skills is called "Blocking Various Attacks]." The purpose of this drill is to teach blockers to block a variety of attacks that will come from the opponents side of the court.

=== Rules of "Blocking Various Attacks" ===
1. Put 3 blockers on one side of the net in left front, middle front, and right front.
2. Have the coach stand on a large block on the other side of the net in the front row directly across from the blockers.
3. The coach will slap the ball and turn and raise their shoulder in the angle of any of the blockers and hit the ball.
4. The blockers will penetrate their hands over the net in order to block the attack. If the coach angles towards the outside, the outside blocker and middle blocker will block the left side together. If the coach angles towards the middle, the middle blocker will block. The player could also put up a triple block (the middle blocker, outside blocker, and right side blocker all block the middle front attack together). If the coach angles towards the right side, the right side blocker and middle block will put up a double block on the right side of the net.
5. To make this drill more game like, replace the coach on the block with an actual setter and 3 hitters on the opposite side of the net.

== Digging drills ==
Digging is another key component in that it is the second line of defense against an attack in the game of volleyball. A drill that allows players to hone their defensive digging skills is called "Digging Drill". The purpose of this drill is for players to practice absorbing the ball.

=== Rules of "Digging Drill" ===
1. Put 3 players on the court in back row defensive positions in right back, middle back, and left back.
2. Have another player standing in the as a target in the setter position.
3. Have the coach positioned on the same side of the court in the front left or front right position facing the 3 back row defensive players.
4. The coach will hit down balls at various speeds to the back row players.
5. The back row players will have to dig the ball to the target position.

== See also ==
- Volleyball
