= Midwestern Intercollegiate Volleyball Association =

College volleyball conference

- MIVA logo
- Association: NCAA
- Sport: Volleyball
- Founded: 1961
- Commissioner: Tim O'Brien
- Division: Division I & Division II
- No. of teams: 9
- Most recent champion: Ball State (2026)
- Website: mivavolleyball.com

The Midwestern Intercollegiate Volleyball Association (MIVA) is a college athletic conference whose member schools compete in men's volleyball. The conference footprint is centered in the Midwestern United States, stretching from Missouri in the west to Ohio in the east, and also extends into Kentucky and North Carolina. Many of the conference's schools also participate in the similarly named Midwest Intercollegiate Volleyball Association in men's volleyball at the club level.

The MIVA Tournament champion receives an automatic bid to the NCAA National Collegiate Men's Volleyball Championship, which now consists of eight teams playing in a single-elimination format to determine the national champion. The two other pre-2017 major volleyball conferences, the EIVA (Eastern Intercollegiate Volleyball Association) and the MPSF (Mountain Pacific Sports Federation), also send their league tournament champions to the tournament, as do Conference Carolinas (since the 2014 season), the Big West Conference (since the 2018 season forward), and the Southern Intercollegiate Athletic Conference (from the 2024 season).

== History ==
On February 4, 1961 the Midwest Intercollegiate Volleyball Conference, the nation's first men's college volleyball league, was started in Lansing, Michigan by representatives of Ball State University, Detroit Institute of Technology, Earlham College, George Williams College, Lansing College, Michigan State University, Ohio State University, and Wittenberg College. The league came about largely through the efforts of Jim Coleman of Wittenberg College and Don Shondell of Ball State University. The league name was later changed to the Midwest Intercollegiate Volleyball Association (MIVA). Over the years, more than 40 schools from Divisions I, II, and III, as well as a couple of junior colleges, have participated as members of the MIVA. The current membership is made up of six D-I (including two charter members) and three D-II institutions, with Lindenwood University and the newest member, 2023 arrival Queens University of Charlotte, having started transitions from D-II to D-I in July 2022.

After the 2025 season, Quincy left for the new men's volleyball league of its primary home of the Great Lakes Valley Conference (GLVC). Lewis and McKendree, despite being full GLVC members, were not named as part of the inaugural GLVC men's volleyball lineup. The MIVA membership remained at 9 teams with the arrival of Northern Kentucky University, which starts varsity men's volleyball play in the 2026 season.

Three MIVA teams have won the NCAA National Collegiate Men's Volleyball Championship, although only two are officially recognized by the NCAA. Lewis' 2003 title was later vacated by the school due to player eligibility issues, and the NCAA no longer recognizes the title. Loyola won the national championship in both 2014 and 2015, and Ohio State won the title in 2011, 2016, and 2017.

== Members ==
The MIVA comprises nine teams from the NCAA's Division I and Division II.

=== Current members ===
The "Joined" column reflects the calendar year in which a school joined the MIVA. Since NCAA men's volleyball is currently a spring sport, the calendar year of entry precedes the first season of competition, except for schools that joined when the conference was formed in February 1961.

| Institution | Location | Founded | Joined | Affiliation | Enrollment | Team Nickname | Primary conference | Arena | Capacity |
|---|---|---|---|---|---|---|---|---|---|
| Ball State University | Muncie, Indiana | 1918 | 1961 | Public | 21,401 | Cardinals | Mid-American (Note: Currently an NCAA Division I athletic conference.) | John E. Worthen Arena | 11,500 |
| Lewis University | Romeoville, Illinois | 1932 | 1994 | Private/Catholic | 5,800 | Flyers | GLVC (Note: Currently an NCAA Division II athletic conference.) | Neil Carey Arena | 1,075 |
| Lindenwood University | St. Charles, Missouri | 1827 | 2013 | Private/Presbyterian | 11,904 | Lions | OVC | Robert F. Hyland Performance Arena | 3,270 |
| Loyola University Chicago | Chicago, Illinois | 1870 | 1996 | Private/Catholic | 15,951 | Ramblers | Atlantic 10 | Joseph J. Gentile Arena | 4,963 |
| McKendree University | Lebanon, Illinois | 1828 | 2015 | Private/Methodist | 3.054 | Bearcats | GLVC | Harry M. Statham Sports Center | 1,500 |
| Northern Kentucky University | Highland Heights, Kentucky | 1968 | 2025 | Public | 15,827 | Norse | Horizon League | Regents Hall | 1,346 |
| Ohio State University | Columbus, Ohio | 1870 | 1961 | Public | 55,014 | Buckeyes | Big Ten | Covelli Center | 3,700 |
| Purdue University Fort Wayne | Fort Wayne, Indiana | 1964 (Note: Purdue Fort Wayne began operating as a standalone institution in 2018, but inherited its athletic program from Indiana University–Purdue University Fort Wayne, established in 1964.) | 1981 | Public | 8,298 | Mastodons | Horizon League | Hilliard Gates Sports Center | 2,800 |
| Queens University of Charlotte | Charlotte, North Carolina | 1857 | 2023 | Private / Presbyterian | 2,463 | Royals | ASUN | Curry Arena | 2,500 |

The most recent changes in MIVA membership were the arrival of Northern Kentucky and departure of Quincy in 2025. Before that, the most recent change was the addition of Queens in 2023.

One current MIVA member changed its institutional and athletic identity after the 2018 men's volleyball season. Indiana University – Purdue University Fort Wayne (IPFW), a joint venture between the Indiana University and Purdue University systems, was dissolved at the end of the 2017–18 school year. IPFW's academic programs in health sciences now operate as Indiana University Fort Wayne, and all other academic programs transferred to Purdue as Purdue University Fort Wayne (PFW). The athletic program was inherited solely by PFW. Shortly before the split took effect, PFW announced that the athletic program, previously known as the Fort Wayne Mastodons, would become the Purdue Fort Wayne Mastodons.

=== Former members ===
Affiliations reflect those for men's volleyball, and are current for the ongoing 2025 NCAA men's volleyball season (2024–25 school year). Institutional names and nicknames reflect those in current (or, for defunct institutions, most recent) use, not necessarily those used while each school was an MIVA member.

The NCAA's top men's volleyball championship is open to schools in Divisions I and II, with scholarship limits identical for members of each division. Therefore, this table makes no distinction between NCAA Division I and Division II conferences.

| Institution | Location | Founded | Joined | Left | Type | Enrollment | Nickname | Current Conference |
|---|---|---|---|---|---|---|---|---|
| Detroit Institute of Technology | Detroit, Michigan | 1891 | 1961 | 1962 | Private/YMCA | Closed | | No Program |
| Earlham College | Richmond, Indiana | 1847 | 1961 | 1985 | Private/Quakers | 1,019 | Quakers | No Program |
| George Williams College | Downers Grove, Illinois | 1890 | 1961 | 1985 | Private/YMCA | Closed | | No Program |
| Michigan State University | East Lansing, Michigan | 1855 | 1961; 1967 | 1962; 1970 | Public | 50,351 | Spartans | No Program |
| Wittenberg University | Springfield, Ohio | 1845 | 1961 | 1962 | Private/Lutheran (ELCA) | 1,738 | Tigers | MCVL (Note: Currently an NCAA Division III athletic conference.) |
| University of Kentucky | Lexington, Kentucky | 1865 | 1962 | 1968 | Public | 29,182 | Wildcats | No Program |
| Lansing Community College | Lansing, Michigan | 1957 | 1962 | 1963 | Community college | 18,551 | Stars | No Program |
| Calvin University | Grand Rapids, Michigan | 1876 | 1962; 1970 | 1962; 1970 | Private/CRC | 3,570 | Knights | MCVL |
| Indiana Institute of Technology | Fort Wayne, Indiana | 1930 | 1962 | 1973 | Private | 9,652 | Warriors | WHAC (Note: Currently an NAIA athletic conference.) |
| University of Louisville | Louisville, Kentucky | 1798 | 1965 | 1965 | Public | 21,430 | Cardinals | No Program |
| Indiana University | Bloomington, Indiana | 1820 | 1965; 1973 | 1969; 1979 | Public | 43,710 | Hoosiers | No Program |
| University of Toledo | Toledo, Ohio | 1872 | 1965; 1981 | 1970; 1982 | Public | 23,085 | Rockets | No Program |
| Southern Illinois University | Carbondale, Illinois | 1869 | 1966 | 1966 | Public | 11,695 | Salukis | No Program |
| Valparaiso University | Valparaiso, Indiana | 1859 | 1967 | 1968 | Private/Lutheran (ELCA) | 4,500 | Beacons | No Program |
| University of Illinois Chicago | Chicago, Illinois | 1946 | 1967 | 1970 | Public | 33,390 | Flames | No Program |
| Purdue University | West Lafayette, Indiana | 1869 | 1969; 1982 | 1975; 1986 | Public | 43,411 | Boilermakers | No Program |
| University of Cincinnati | Cincinnati, Ohio | 1819 | 1969; 1980 | 1969; 1982 | Public | 46,388 | Bearcats | No Program |
| University of Michigan | Ann Arbor, Michigan | 1817 | 1970; 1975; 1982 | 1970; 1975; 1986 | Public | 46,002 | Wolverines | No Program |
| Anderson University | Anderson, Indiana | 1917 | 1970 | 1970 | Private/Church of God (Anderson) | 1,877 | Ravens | No Program |
| Kellogg Community College | Battle Creek, Michigan | 1956 | 1970 | 1985 | Community college | 8,400 | Bruins | No Program |
| Bowling Green State University | Bowling Green, Ohio | 1910 | 1971 | 1985 | Public | 20,395 | Falcons | No Program |
| Wright State University | Fairborn, Ohio (Note: The campus has a Dayton mailing address.) | 1967 | 1978 | 1979 | Public | 13,520 | Raiders | No Program |
| University of Wisconsin–Madison | Madison, Wisconsin | 1848 | 1979 | 1980 | Public | 44,413 | Badgers | No Program |
| University of Notre Dame | Notre Dame, Indiana | 1842 | 1983 | 1988 | Private/Catholic | 12,292 | Fighting Irish | No Program |
| College of Wooster | Wooster, Ohio | 1866 | 1984 | 1984 | Private/Presbyterian (PCUSA) | 2,000 | Fighting Scots | No Program |
| Hardin–Simmons University | Abilene, Texas | 1891 | 1986 | 1986 | Private/Baptist | 2,392 | Cowboys | No Program |
| Graceland University | Lamoni, Iowa | 1895 | 1987 | 1990 | Private/Community of Christ | 2,222 | Yellowjackets | HAAC |
| University of Wisconsin–Milwaukee | Milwaukee, Wisconsin | 1956 | 1991 | 1997 | Public | 26,037 | Panthers | No Program |
| Thomas More University | Crestview Hills, Kentucky | 1921 | 1995 | 1997 | Private/Catholic | 1,963 | Saints | GLVC (Note: Thomas More will drop men's volleyball after the 2026 season.) |
| Mercyhurst University | Erie, Pennsylvania | 1926 | 1997 | 2008 | Private/Catholic | 2,759 | Lakers | No Program |
| Clarke University | Dubuque, Iowa | 1843 | 1998 | 2007 | Private/Catholic | 1,200 | Pride | HAAC |
| University of Findlay | Findlay, Ohio | 1882 | 2001 | 2005 | Private/Churches of God (Winebrenner) | 3,700 | Oilers | No Program |
| Carthage College | Kenosha, Wisconsin | 1847 | 2005 | 2007 | Private/Lutheran (ELCA) | 2,800 | Firebirds | CCIW |
| Milwaukee School of Engineering | Milwaukee, Wisconsin | 1903 | 2005 | 2007 | Private/Nonsectarian | 2,820 | Raiders | NACC |
| Central State University | Wilberforce, Ohio | 1887 | 2006 | 2007 | Public/HBCU | 2,119 | Marauders | SIAC |
| Grand Canyon University | Phoenix, Arizona | 1949 | 2010 | 2017 | For-profit/Nondenominational (Note: Grand Canyon's for-profit status is disputed. The U.S. Department of Education considers GCU to be for-profit, but the NCAA, the state of Arizona, and the Internal Revenue Service all treat it as a nonprofit.) | 20,500 (Note: Approximate residential enrollment at time of departure. In 2025–26, residential enrollment is about 25,300, and total enrollment including online students is over 103,000.) | Antelopes | No program (Note: Grand Canyon downgraded its men's volleyball team from varsity to club status after the 2025 season.) |
| Quincy University | Quincy, Illinois | 1860 | 1994 | 2025 | Private/Catholic | 1,300 | Hawks | GLVC |

== Champions ==
1961–1989
| Year | Regular season | Tournament |
|---|---|---|
| 1961 | George Williams | No Tournament |
| 1962 | George Williams | No Tournament |
| 1963 | George Williams | No Tournament |
| 1964 | Ball State | Ball State |
| 1965 | Ball State | Ball State |
| 1966 | Ball State | Ball State |
| 1967 | Ball State | Ball State |
| 1968 | Ball State | Ball State |
| 1969 | Ohio State | Ohio State |
| 1970 | Ball State | No Tournament |
| 1971 | Ball State | No Tournament |
| 1972 | Ohio State | No Tournament |
| 1973 | Ball State | No Tournament |
| 1974 | Ball State / Ohio State | No Tournament |
| 1975 | Ball State / Ohio State | No Tournament |
| 1976 | Ball State | No Tournament |
| 1977 | Ohio State | No Tournament |
| 1978 | Ohio State | No Tournament |
| 1979 | Ball State | No Tournament |
| 1980 | Kellogg CC | Kellogg CC |
| 1981 | Ohio State | Ohio State |
| 1982 | Ohio State | Ohio State |
| 1983 | Ohio State | Ohio State |
| 1984 | Ball State | Ball State |
| 1985 | Ball State | Ball State |
| 1986 | Ohio State | Ohio State |
| 1987 | Ohio State | Ohio State |
| 1988 | Ball State | Ball State |
| 1989 | Ball State | Ball State |

1990–present
| Year | Regular season | Tournament |
|---|---|---|
| 1990 | Ball State / IPFW | Ball State |
| 1991 | IPFW | IPFW |
| 1992 | IPFW | IPFW |
| 1993 | IPFW / Ohio State | Ohio State |
| 1994 | IPFW | Ball State |
| 1995 | Ball State / Ohio State | Ball State |
| 1996 | Ball State / Lewis / Ohio State | Lewis |
| 1997 | Ball State | Ball State |
| 1998 | Ohio State | Lewis |
| 1999 | IPFW / Ohio State | IPFW |
| 2000 | Ohio State | Ohio State |
| 2001 | Lewis* | Ohio State |
| 2002 | Ball State / Loyola Chicago | Ball State |
| 2003 | Lewis* | Lewis* |
| 2004 | Ohio State | Lewis |
| 2005 | Loyola Chicago | Ohio State |
| 2006 | Loyola Chicago | IPFW |
| 2007 | Ohio State | IPFW |
| 2008 | Ohio State | Ohio State |
| 2009 | Ohio State | Ohio State |
| 2010 | Ohio State | Ohio State |
| 2011 | Ohio State | Ohio State |
| 2012 | Lewis / Ohio State | Lewis |
| 2013 | Lewis / Loyola Chicago | Loyola Chicago |
| 2014 | Loyola Chicago | Loyola Chicago |
| 2015 | Lewis | Loyola Chicago |
| 2016 | Ohio State | Ohio State |
| 2017 | Ohio State | Ohio State |
| 2018 | Loyola Chicago / Ohio State | Ohio State |
| 2019 | Lewis | Lewis |
| 2021 | Lewis | Lewis |
| 2022 | Ball State | Ball State |
| 2023 | Ball State / Loyola Chicago / Ohio State | Ohio State |
| 2024 | Ball State | Ohio State |
| 2025 | Loyola Chicago / McKendree | Loyola Chicago |
| 2026 | Ball State | Ball State |

=== Titles ===
| Total | School | Reg. | Tourney | Last |
|---|---|---|---|---|
| 47 | Ohio State | 28 | 19 | 2024 |
| 41 | Ball State | 25 | 16 | 2026 |
| 12 | Lewis | 6 | 6 | 2021 |
| 12 | Loyola Chicago | 8 | 4 | 2025 |
| 11 | Purdue Fort Wayne | 6 | 5 | 2007 |
| 3 | George Williams | 3 | 0 | 1963 |
| 2 | Kellogg CC | 1 | 1 | 1980 |
| 1 | McKendree | 1 | 0 | 2025 |

== MIVA in the NCAA tournament ==
Until 2014, the NCAA National Collegiate Men's Volleyball Championship was a Final Four only tournament with the champions of three conferences (EIVA, MIVA, and MPSF) receiving automatic bids and one team getting an at-large bid.

The tournament has since expanded five times:

- In 2014, the tournament expanded to include the champion of the Division II Conference Carolinas and a second at-large team.
- In 2018, the addition of the Big West Conference champion resulted in a seven-team field.
- The 2024 tournament expanded to eight teams with the addition of the Southern Intercollegiate Athletic Conference champion.
- The next season saw the addition of the Northeast Conference (now officially known as NEC) champion, bringing the field to nine teams.
- In 2026, the tournament expanded to 12 teams, with seven conference champions and five at-large teams.

| Year | School | Finish |
|---|---|---|
| 1970 | Ball State | 4th |
| 1971 | Ball State | 3rd |
| 1972 | Ball State | 3rd |
| 1973 | Ball State | 3rd |
| 1974 | Ball State | 3rd |
| 1975 | Ohio State | 3rd |
| 1976 | Ohio State | 3rd |
| 1977 | Ohio State | Runner-up |
| 1978 | Ohio State | 3rd |
| 1979 | Ball State | 4th |
| 1980 | Ohio State | 3rd |
| 1981 | Ohio State | 4th |
| 1982 | Ohio State | 4th |
| 1983 | Ohio State | 3rd |
| 1984 | Ball State | 4th |

| Year | School | Finish |
|---|---|---|
| 1985 | Ball State | 4th |
| 1986 | Ohio State | 4th |
| 1987 | Ohio State | 4th |
| 1988 | Ball State | 3rd |
| 1989 | Ball State | 4th |
| 1990 | Ball State | 3rd |
| 1991 | IPFW (Note: Branded as "Fort Wayne" in the 2017 and 2018 seasons, and "Purdue Fort Wayne" afterwards.) | 3rd |
| 1992 | IPFW | 4th |
| 1993 | Ohio State | 4th |
| 1994 | Ball State | 3rd |
| 1994 | IPFW | 4th |
| 1995 | Ball State | 3rd |
| 1996 | Lewis | 3rd |
| 1997 | Ball State | 3rd |
| 1998 | Lewis | 3rd |

| Year | School | Finish |
|---|---|---|
| 1999 | IPFW | 3rd |
| 2000 | Ohio State | Runner-up |
| 2001 | Ohio State | 3rd |
| 2002 | Ball State | 3rd |
| 2003 | Lewis | Champions (Note: Title vacated due to NCAA violations.) |
| 2004 | Lewis | 3rd |
| 2005 | Ohio State | 3rd |
| 2006 | IPFW | 3rd |
| 2007 | IPFW | Runner-up |
| 2008 | Ohio State | 3rd |
| 2009 | Ohio State | 3rd |
| 2010 | Ohio State | 3rd |
| 2011 | Ohio State | Champions |
| 2012 | Lewis | 3rd |
| 2013 | Loyola Chicago | 3rd |

| Year | School | Finish |
|---|---|---|
| 2014 | Loyola Chicago | Champions |
| 2014 | Lewis | 5th |
| 2015 | Loyola Chicago | Champions |
| 2015 | Lewis | Runner-up |
| 2016 | Ohio State | Champions |
| 2017 | Ohio State | Champions |
| 2018 | Ohio State | 3rd |
| 2019 | Lewis | 3rd |
| 2021 | Lewis | 3rd |
| 2022 | Ball State | 3rd |
| 2023 | Ohio State | Quarterfinals |
| 2024 | Ohio State | Quarterfinals |
| 2025 | Loyola Chicago | Quarterfinals |
| 2026 | Ball State | Semifinals |
| 2026 | Loyola Chicago | Regional finals (Note: Equivalent to the pre-2026 quarterfinals.) |
