= Lebanon, Illinois =

- City
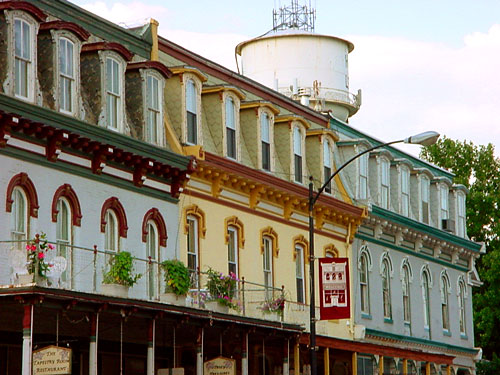
- Lebanon Historic District

- Location of Lebanon in St. Clair County, Illinois.
- Coordinates: 38°36′02″N 89°48′41″W
- Country: United States
- State: Illinois
- County: St. Clair

Area
  - Total: 2.70 sq mi (7.00 km^{2})
  - Land: 2.69 sq mi (6.98 km^{2})
  - Water: 0.0077 sq mi (0.02 km^{2})
- Elevation: 456 ft (139 m)

Population (2020)
  - Total: 4,691
  - Density: 1,740.7/sq mi (672.09/km^{2})
- Time zone: UTC-6 (CST)
  - Summer (DST): UTC-5 (CDT)
- ZIP code: 62254
- Area code: 618
- FIPS code: 17-42496
- GNIS feature ID: 2395663
- Website: www.lebanonil.org

Lebanon is a city in St. Clair County, Illinois, United States. The population was 4,691 at the 2020 census It is a part of the Metro East region of the Greater St. Louis metropolitan area. Lebanon is home to McKendree University, the oldest college in Illinois.

== Geography ==
According to the 2010 census, Lebanon has a total area of 2.474 square miles (6.41 km^{2}), of which 2.46 square miles (6.37 km^{2}) (or 99.43%) is land and 0.014 square miles (0.04 km^{2}) (or 0.57%) is water.

== Demographics ==
Historical population
Census	Pop.	Note	%±
1860	1,691		—
1870	2,117		25.2%
1880	1,924		−9.1%
1890	1,636		−15.0%
1900	1,812		10.8%
1910	1,907		5.2%
1920	1,883		−1.3%
1930	1,828		−2.9%
1940	1,867		2.1%
1950	2,417		29.5%
1960	2,863		18.5%
1970	3,564		24.5%
1980	3,245		−9.0%
1990	3,688		13.7%
2000	3,523		−4.5%
2010	4,418		25.4%
2020	4,691		6.2%
U.S. Decennial Census

=== Racial and ethnic composition ===
Lebanon city, Illinois – Racial and ethnic composition Note: the US Census treats Hispanic/Latino as an ethnic category. This table excludes Latinos from the racial categories and assigns them to a separate category. Hispanics/Latinos may be of any race.
Race / Ethnicity (NH = Non-Hispanic)	Pop 2000	Pop 2010	Pop 2020	% 2000	% 2010	% 2020
White alone (NH)	2,730	3,457	3,438	77.49%	78.25%	73.29%
Black or African American alone (NH)	650	710	725	18.45%	16.07%	15.46%
Native American or Alaska Native alone (NH)	10	4	9	0.28%	0.09%	0.19%
Asian alone (NH)	17	30	60	0.48%	0.68%	1.28%
Native Hawaiian or Pacific Islander alone (NH)	3	5	2	0.09%	0.11%	0.04%
Other race alone (NH)	5	5	18	0.14%	0.11%	0.38%
Mixed race or Multiracial (NH)	54	106	242	1.53%	2.40%	5.16%
Hispanic or Latino (any race)	54	101	197	1.53%	2.29%	4.20%
Total	3,523	4,418	4,691	100.00%	100.00%	100.00%

=== 2020 census ===
As of the 2020 census, Lebanon had a population of 4,691. The median age was 31.8 years. 14.3% of residents were under the age of 18 and 18.5% of residents were 65 years of age or older. For every 100 females there were 93.0 males, and for every 100 females age 18 and over there were 91.9 males age 18 and over.

97.4% of residents lived in urban areas, while 2.6% lived in rural areas.

There were 1,680 households in Lebanon, of which 22.9% had children under the age of 18 living in them. Of all households, 40.1% were married-couple households, 22.5% were households with a male householder and no spouse or partner present, and 30.2% were households with a female householder and no spouse or partner present. About 35.6% of all households were made up of individuals and 14.5% had someone living alone who was 65 years of age or older.

There were 1,900 housing units, of which 11.6% were vacant. The homeowner vacancy rate was 2.0% and the rental vacancy rate was 7.2%.

Racial composition as of the 2020 census
Race	Number	Percent
White	3,504	74.7%
Black or African American	736	15.7%
American Indian and Alaska Native	13	0.3%
Asian	62	1.3%
Native Hawaiian and Other Pacific Islander	2	0.0%
Some other race	60	1.3%
Two or more races	314	6.7%

=== 2010 census ===
As of the 2010 census, there were 5,523 people, 1,275 households, and 804 families residing in the city. The population density was 1,641.4 inhabitants per square mile (633.7/km^{2}). There were 1,389 housing units at an average density of 647.2 per square mile (249.9/km^{2}). The racial makeup of the city was 78.46% White, 18.45% African American, 0.34% Native American, 0.48% Asian, 0.09% Pacific Islander, 0.40% from other races, and 1.79% from two or more races. Hispanic or Latino of any race were 1.53% of the population.

There were 1,275 households, out of which 28.8% had children under the age of 18 living with them, 48.2% were married couples living together, 11.5% had a female householder with no husband present, and 36.9% were non-families. 28.5% of all households were made up of individuals, and 12.9% had someone living alone who was 65 years of age or older. The average household size was 2.41 and the average family size was 2.98.

In the city, the population was spread out, with 20.8% under the age of 18, 18.6% from 18 to 24, 22.9% from 25 to 44, 21.0% from 45 to 64, and 16.7% who were 65 years of age or older. The median age was 36 years. For every 100 females, there were 84.7 males. For every 100 females age 18 and over, there were 80.8 males.

The median income for a household in the city was $37,042, and the median income for a family was $48,711. Males had a median income of $30,597 versus $21,341 for females. The per capita income for the city was $17,125. About 9.8% of families and 13.4% of the population were below the poverty line, including 14.2% of those under age 18 and 7.1% of those age 65 or over.

== Arts and culture ==
Registered historic places include:

- Emerald Mound and Village Site
- Lebanon Historic District
- Mermaid House Hotel

== Education ==
Lebanon is home to the oldest founded college in the state of Illinois, McKendree University, and is also home to Lebanon Grade School and Lebanon High School (home of the Greyhounds).

== Media ==
The Lebanon Advertiser has operated since 1911.

== Notable people ==
- Christine Brewer, Grammy Award-winning operatic/classical singer
- Ed Busch, MLB shortstop for St. Louis Browns and Philadelphia Phillies
- Bill Cofield, former University of Wisconsin basketball head coach
- Mark Consuelos, daytime soap actor
- Neal Cotts, relief pitcher for several teams
- Craig Virgin, track and field distance runner
