= Covelli Center =

Arena in Columbus, Ohio, US

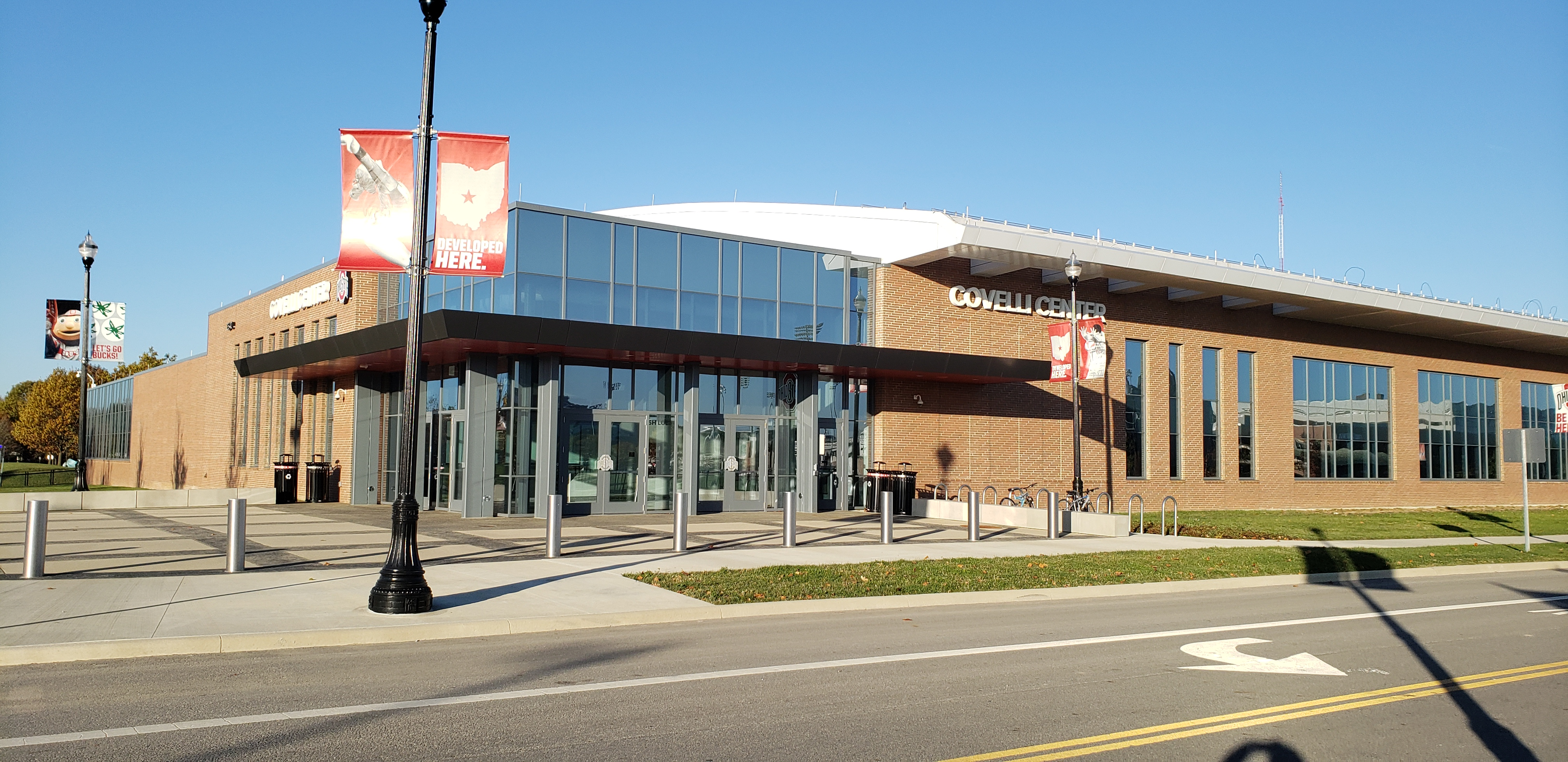

- Location in Ohio Location in the United States
- Address: 2640 Fred Taylor Drive
- Location: Columbus, Ohio, U.S.
- Coordinates: 40°0′50″N 83°1′40″W
- Owner: Ohio State University
- Operator: Ohio State University Department of Athletics
- Seating type: Bleacher, standing Room
- Capacity: 3,700
- Type: Multi-purpose stadium
- Event: Sport
- Public transit: COTA & CABS

Construction
- Groundbreaking: September 2017
- Opened: 4 June 2019
- Cost: $48.9 million
- Architect: Moody Nolan/Populous
- Structural engineer: Pinnacle Infotech
- General contractor: Gilbane Building Company

Tenants
- Ohio State Buckeyes (NCAA); Women’s basketball (secondary) 2019–present Fencing 2019–present Men's gymnastics 2019–present Women's gymnastics 2019–present Men's volleyball 2019–present Women's volleyball 2019–present Wrestling 2019–present

Website
- OhioStateBuckeyes.com

The Covelli Center is a multi-purpose arena located on the campus of Ohio State University in Columbus, Ohio. The 3,700-seat facility is situated at 2640 Fred Taylor Drive, the area provides a home to seven varsity sports teams. The building is attached the Jennings Wrestling Practice Facility.

== About ==
The 100,000 square feet (9,300 m^{2}) facility was opened on June 4, 2019, and serves as the home to the fencing, men's and women's gymnastics, men's and women's volleyball, and wrestling programs. The site also occasionally serves as a venue for the women's basketball team. This state-of-the-art arena is able to be configured to accommodate several athletic events and includes 10 locker rooms, seven coach's offices as well as athletic training and meeting spaces.

Construction of the arena began in September 2017 and was originally slated to open in 2018, but was delayed until June 2019.

According to Ohio State, the facility hosted 158 student-athletes, 58 competitions and around 1,500 youth campers in its first year.

== Plans ==
The building was originally intended to replace the aging St. John Arena, which was built in 1956. After a public outcry, university officials changed the plan and built it in its current location. However, with the new location, 50 graduate-student apartments were torn down in Buckeye Village. Additionally, it raised the cost from an estimated $30 million to nearly $50 million.

== Naming ==
The facility was named after Sam Covelli after he and his wife Caryn donated $10 million towards the project. Covelli is the founder and president of Covelli Enterprises, which is the largest Panera Bread franchisee. The remaining costs for the project were raised through private donors.

== Tenants ==
- Women's basketball – Hosting select games at the Covelli Center
- Fencing
- Men's and women's volleyball – Practice and match facility for both teams
- Men's and women's gymnastics – Meet facility
- Wrestling – Meet facility
