= 2023 Benedict Tigers volleyball team =

American college volleyball season

2023 Benedict Tigers men's volleyball
- Conference: Southern Intercollegiate Athletic Conference
- Record: 11–7 (6-4 SIAC)
- Head coach: Gwendolyn Rouse (2nd season)
- Home arena: HRC Arena

The 2023 Benedict Tigers volleyball team, the second ever Benedict men's volleyball team represents Benedict College in the 2023 NCAA Division I & II men's volleyball season. The Tigers, led by second year head coach Gwendolyn Rouse, play their home games at HRC Arena. The Tigers compete as members of the Southern Intercollegiate Athletic Conference. Benedict was picked to finish third in the 2023 SIAC preseason poll.

2023 Southern Intercollegiate Athletic Conference men's volleyball standings
	Conf.				Overall
Team	W		L	PCT	W		L	PCT
Edward Waters ‍†‍‡‍	10	–	0	1.000	14	–	4	.778
Central State (OH) ‍‍‍	8	–	2	.800	17	–	14	.548
Benedict ‍‍‍	6	–	5	.545	11	–	8	.579
Fort Valley State ‍‍‍	4	–	6	.400	7	–	19	.269
Kentucky State ‍‍‍	2	–	8	.200	3	–	26	.103
Morehouse ‍‍‍	0	–	11	.000	0	–	19	.000
† – Conference champion ‡ – SIAC tournament champion

== Roster ==
2023 Benedict Tigers roster
Defensive specialist/libero: 2 Malachi Surney - Sophomore; 15 Clint Forbes - Sophomore; Middle blockers: 5 De'Andrae Taylor - Freshman	Outside hitters: 6 Donovan Wilmott - Junior; 9 Ras Jesse Delancy - Sophomore; 12 Zion Beckford - Freshman; 2 Malachi Surney - Sophomore	Opposite hitters: 8 Jomari Jacobs - Freshman; 10 Marlon Belizaire - Freshman; 12 Zion Beckford - Freshman; Setters: 3 Terran Walkin - Freshman; 13 Ahijaa Sweeney - Freshman

== Schedule ==
TV/Internet Streaming information:

All home games will be streamed on HBCU League Pass+. Most road games will also be streamed by the schools streaming service.

Date time	Opponent (Seed)	Rank (Seed)	Arena city (tournament)	Television	Score	Attendance	Record
1/28; 2 p.m.	vs. Milligan		Harris Athletic Complex; Cleveland, GA		W 3-1 (25-11, 25-10, 23-25, 25-16)	0	1-0
1/28; 4 p.m.	@ Truett McConnell		Harris Athletic Complex; Cleveland, GA	YouTube	W 3-0 (25-15, 25-14, 25-22)	0	2-0
2/07; 6 p.m.	Truett McConnell		HRC Arena; Columbia, SC	HBCU League Pass+	W 3-1 (25-19, 25-22, 24-26, 25-18)		3-0
2/22; 6 p.m.	Reinhardt		HRC Arena; Columbia, SC	HBCU League Pass+	L 0-3 (12-25, 16-25, 18-25)	100	3-1
2/24; 6 p.m.	@ Morehouse*		Forbes Arena; Atlanta, GA	HBCU League Pass+	W 3-0 (25-10, 25-10, 25-23)		4-1 (1-0)
2/25; 7 p.m.	Central State*		HRC Arena; Columbia, SC	HBCU League Pass+	L 0-3 (13-25, 21-25, 20-25)	60	4-2 (1-1)
2/28; 7 p.m.	@ Erskine		Belk Arena; Due West, SC	Conference Carolinas DN	L 1-3 (14-25, 25-15, 15-25, 25-27)	132	4-3
3/10; 6 p.m.	@ Central State*		Beacom/Lewis Gym; Wilberforce, OH	Central State All-Access	L 0-3 (10-25, 21-25, 18-25)	107	4-4 (1-2)
3/11; 1 p.m.	@ Kentucky State*		Bell Gymnasium; Frankfort, KY	Stellascope	W 3-1 (25-22, 25-8, 26-28, 25-20)	36	5-4 (2-2)
3/11; 3 p.m.	@ Kentucky State*		Bell Gymnasium; Frankfort, KY	Stellascope	W 3-0 (25-12, 25-16, 25-18)	36	6-4 (3-2)
3/17; 6 p.m.	Edward Waters*		HRC Arena; Columbia, SC	HBCU League Pass+	L 0-3 (19-25, 16-25, 17-25)	75	6-5 (3-3)
3/18; 2 p.m.	Morehouse*		HRC Arena; Columbia, SC	HBCU League Pass+	W 3-0 (25-21, 25-15, 25-11)	50	7-5 (4-3)
3/20; 6 p.m.	@ Reinhardt		Brown Athletic Center; Waleska, GA	Presto Sports	L 0-3 (19-25, 14-25, 20-25)	50	7-6
3/24; 6 p.m.	Fort Valley State*		HRC Arena; Columbia, SC	HBCU League Pass+	W 3-2 (25-22, 25-22, 24-26, 14-25, 21-19)	225	8-6 (5-3)
3/25; 2 p.m.	@ Edward Waters*		Adams-Jenkins Complex; Jacksonville, FL	YouTube	L 0-3 (14-25, 18-25, 19-25)	31	8-7 (5-4)
3/28; 6 p.m.	@ Carolina		Williams Gymnasium in the Pope Activities Center; Winston-Salem, NC	Carolina Bruins SN on Stretch	W 3-2 (25-27, 25-22, 27-29, 25-18, 15-12)	80	9-7
4/13; 6 p.m.	Carolina		HRC Arena; Columbia, SC	HBCU League Pass+	W 3-2 (20-25, 25-15, 25-18, 14-25, 15-9)	90	10-7
4/15; 5 p.m.	@ Fort Valley State*		HPE Arena; Ft. Valley, GA	Team 1 Sports	W 3-2 (25-22, 14-25, 21-25, 27-25, 15-9)	102	11-7 (6-4)

*-Indicates conference match.
Times listed are Eastern Time Zone.

== Announcers for televised games ==
- Truett McConnell:
- Truett McConnell:
- Reinhardt:
- Morehouse:
- Central State:
- Erskine:
- Central State:
- Kentucky State:
- Edward Waters:
- Morehouse:
- Reinhardt:
- Fort Valley State:
- Edward Waters:
- Carolina:
- Carolina:
- Fort Valley State:
