= 2022 Fort Valley State Wildcats men's volleyball team =

American college volleyball season

2022 Fort Valley State Wildcats men's volleyball
- Conference: Southern Intercollegiate Athletic Conference
- Record: 8–14 (6–4 SIAC)
- Head coach: Larry Wrather (1st season)
- Assistant coach: Edward Wrather (1st season)
- Home arena: HPE Arena

The 2022 Fort Valley State Wildcats men's volleyball team, the first ever Fort Valley State men's volleyball team, represents Fort Valley State University in the 2022 NCAA Division I & II men's volleyball season. The Wildcats, led by first year head coach Larry Wrather, play their home games at HPE Arena. The Wildcats compete as members of the Southern Intercollegiate Athletic Conference.

2022 Southern Intercollegiate Athletic Conference men's volleyball standings
	Conf.				Overall
Team	W		L	PCT	W		L	PCT
Central State ‍†‍‡‍	9	–	1	.900	12	–	13	.480
Edward Waters ‍†‍‍	9	–	1	.900	13	–	18	.419
Fort Valley State ‍‍‍	6	–	4	.600	8	–	14	.364
Benedict ‍‍‍	4	–	6	.400	8	–	14	.364
Kentucky State ‍‍‍	2	–	8	.200	3	–	15	.167
Morehouse ‍‍‍	0	–	10	.000	0	–	19	.000
† – Conference champion ‡ – 2022 SIAC Tournament champion: y- Invited to the NCAA volleyball tournament As of March 17, 2025 Rankings from AVCA

== Season highlights ==
- Will be filled in as the season progresses.

== Roster ==
2022 Fort Valley State Wildcats roster
Defensive Specialist/Libero: 3 Jae Henderson- Freshman; Middle blockers: 2 Jordan Brown - Freshman; 7 Zuri Williams - Freshman; 10 Marty Boyd - Freshman	Outside hitters: 1 Schadrac Metayer - Freshman; 6 Jamil Scott - Freshman; 8 Rekey Singleton - Freshman; 9 Oshane Farquharson - Freshman; 11 Kevin Charles - Sophomore; 14 Rashuan Wright - Freshman	Opposite hitters: 17 Jaxon Hicks - Freshman; Setters: 25 Justin Yates - Freshman

== Schedule ==
TV/Internet Streaming information:

All home games will be streamed on Team 1 Sports. Most road games will also be streamed by the schools streaming service.

Date Time	Opponent (Seed)	Rank (Seed)	Arena City (Tournament)	Television	Score	Attendance	Record
1/12; 6 p.m.	@ Reinhardt		Brown Athletic Center; Waleska, GA	Reinhardt Stretch	PPD- COVID-19		
1/15; 4 p.m.	@ King		Student Center Complex; Bristol, TN	Coastal Carolinas DN	L 0–3 (17–25, 17–25, 20–25)	208	0–1
1/21; 6 p.m.	Tusculum		HPE Arena; Fort Valley, GA	Team 1 Sports	Cancelled- COVID-19		
1/21; 6 p.m.	Benedict*		HPE Arena; Fort Valley, GA	Team 1 Sports	W 3–0 (25–15, 25–20, 25–18)	22	1–1 (1–0)
1/29; 12 p.m.	vs. Belmont Abbey		Brown Athletic Center; Waleska, GA	Reinhardt Stretch	L 0–3 (17–25, 14–25, 21–25)	25	1–2
1/29; 3 p.m.	@ Renihardt		Brown Athletic Center; Waleska, GA	Reinhardt Stretch	L 0–3 (23–25, 17–25, 21–25)	25	1–3
2/01; 5 p.m.	Life		HPE Arena; Fort Valley, GA	Team 1 Sports	PPD- COVID-19		
2/04; 6 p.m.	@ North Greenville		Hayes Gymnasium; Tigerville, South Carolina	Conference Carolinas DN	PPD- COVID-19		
2/12; 7 p.m.	@ Charleston (WV)		Russell and Martha Wehrle Innovation Center; Charleston, WV	Mountain East Network	L 0–3 (15–25, 8–25, 18–25)	42	1–4
2/13; 1 p.m.	@ Charleston (WV)		Russell and Martha Wehrle Innovation Center; Charleston, WV	Mountain East Network	L 0–3 (13–25, 15–25, 9–25)	56	1–5
2/18; 6 p.m.	@ Tusculum		Pioneer Arena; Tusculum, TN	Tusculum Stretch	L 0–3 (13–25, 14–25, 23–25)	113	1–6
2/19; 6 p.m.	Emmanuel		HPE Arena; Fort Valley, GA	Team 1 Sports	Cancelled- Health & Safety. Bus flipped on the way back from Tusculum.		
2/26; 6 p.m.	@ Benedict*		HRC Arena; Columbia, SC	Benedict Live Stream	PPD to March 16- Health & Safety.		
3/04; 6:30 p.m.	Central State*		HPE Arena; Fort Valley, GA		L 2–3 (25–22, 26–24, 23–25, 19–25, 10–15)	45	1–7 (1–1)
3/05; 6 p.m.	Kentucky State*		HPE Arena; Fort Valley, GA		W 3–0 (25–19, 25–19, 25–15)	56	2–7 (2–1)
3/07; 6 p.m.	Maryville		HPE Arena; Fort Valley, GA	Team 1 Sports	L 0–3 (24–26, 23–25, 22–25)	115	2–8
3/08; 2 p.m.	North Greenville		HPE Arena; Fort Valley, GA	Team 1 Sports	Cancelled- COVID-19		
3/12; 6 p.m.	@ Emmanuel		Shaw Athletic Center; Franklin Springs, GA	Conference Carolinas DN	L 1–3 (25–21, 18–25, 14–25, 22–25)	44	2–9
3/16; 4 p.m.	@ Benedict*		C.A. Johnson High School; Columbia, SC		W 3–1 (22–25, 25–18, 25–15, 27–25)	50	3–9 (3–1)
3/18; 6 p.m.	Morehouse*		HPE Arena; Fort Valley, GA	Team 1 Sports	W 3–0 (25–7, 25–17, 25–14)	31	4–9 (4–1)
3/19; 6 p.m.	Edward Waters*		HPE Arena; Fort Valley, GA	Team 1 Sports	L 1–3 (23–25, 25–23, 12–25, 18–25)	47	4–10 (4–2)
3/26; 6 p.m.	#1 UCLA		HPE Arena; Fort Valley, GA		L 0–3 (8–25, 10–25, 11–25)	101	4–11
4/01; 6 p.m.	@ Morehouse*		Forbes Arena; Atlanta, GA		W 3–0 (25–7, 25–14, 25–7)	35	5–11 (5–2)
4/08; 6 p.m.	@ Kentucky State*		Bell Gymnasium; Frankfort, KY		W 3–0 (25–23, 25–13, 25–15)	20	6–11 (6–2)
4/09; 2 p.m.	@ Central State*		Beacom-Lewis Gym; Wilberforce, OH	Marauder SN	L 0–3 (17–25, 19–25, 22–25)	171	6–12 (6–3)
4/15; 6 p.m.	@ Edward Waters*		Adams-Jenkins Complex; Jacksonville, FL	YouTube	L 2–3 (23–25, 21–25, 28–26, 25–20, 14–16)	77	6–13 (6–4)
4/19; 1 p.m.	vs. Morehouse^{(6)}	^{(3)}	Rock Hill Sport & Event Center; Rock Hill, SC (SIAC Tournament)	YouTube	W 3–0 (25–12, 25–11, 25–10)		7–13
4/19; 4 p.m.	vs. Edward Waters^{(2)}	^{(3)}	Rock Hill Sport & Event Center; Rock Hill, SC (SIAC Tournament)	YouTube	L 2–3 (25–18, 25–21, 20–25, 23–25, 12–15)		7–14
4/19; 1 p.m.	vs. Kentucky State^{(5)}	^{(3)}	Rock Hill Sport & Event Center; Rock Hill, SC (SIAC Tournament)	YouTube	W 3–0 (25–6, 25–9, 25–20).		
4/19; 4 p.m.	vs. Benedict^{(4)}	^{(3)}	Rock Hill Sport & Event Center; Rock Hill, SC (SIAC Tournament)	YouTube			

*-Indicates conference match.
Times listed are Eastern Time Zone.

== Announcers for televised games ==
- King: Brittany Ramsey & Julie Ward
- Benedict: No commentary
- Belmont Abbey: No commentary
- Reinhardt: No commentary
- Charleston: Jack Withrow & Mychal Schulz
- Charleston: Mychal Schulz
- Tusculum: Jim Miller
- Maryville: No commentary
- Emmanuel: Logan Reese & Taylor Roberts
- Morehouse: No commentary
- Edward Waters: No commentary
- Central State: Doug Brown
- Edward Waters: No commentary
- Morehouse: No commentary
- Edward Waters: No commentary
- Kentucky State: No commentary
- Benedict: No commentary
