= 2023 Barton Bulldogs men's volleyball team =

American college volleyball season

2023 Barton Bulldogs men's volleyball
- Conference: Conference Carolinas
- Record: 5-19 (4-10 Conference Carolinas)
- Head coach: J.T. Deppe (1st season)
- Home arena: Wilson Gymnasium

The 2023 Barton Bulldogs men's volleyball team represented Barton College in the 2023 NCAA Division I & II men's volleyball season. The Bulldogs, led by interim head coach J.T. Deppe, were picked to finish eighth in the Conference Carolinas coaches preseason poll.

2023 Conference Carolinas men's volleyball standings
	Conf.				Overall
Team	W		L	PCT	W		L	PCT
North Greenville ‍†‍‍	11	–	3	.786	19	–	8	.704
Erskine ‍‍‍	9	–	5	.643	14	–	13	.519
No. 15 King ‍‍‡‍^{y}	8	–	6	.571	16	–	16	.500
Belmont Abbey ‍‍‍	8	–	6	.571	15	–	16	.484
Lees-McRae ‍‍‍	7	–	7	.500	11	–	15	.423
Mount Olive ‍‍‍	6	–	8	.429	11	–	17	.393
Barton ‍‍‍	4	–	10	.286	5	–	19	.208
Emmanuel ‍‍‍	3	–	11	.214	8	–	20	.286
† – Conference champion ‡ – 2023 Conference Carolinas Tournament champion: y- Invited to the NCAA volleyball tournament As of March 13, 2025 Rankings from AVCA

== Roster ==
2023 Barton Bulldogs roster
Defensive specialist/libero: 1 Raymond Green - Sophomore; 6 Bryan Medellin - Senior; Middle blockers: 9 Thomas Fanic - Junior; 18 Liosdan Gonzales - Junior; 19 Benjamin Wiechert - Sophomore	Outside hitters: 2 Brandon Johnston - Junior; 10 John Coffey - Junior; 17 Cooper Edwards - Freshman; 20 Jack Sandahl - Sophomore; 21 Colton Wilson - Sophomore	Opposite hitters: 9 Thomas Fanic - Junior; 11 Jake Adams - Sophomore; 19 Benjamin Wiechert - Sophomore; Setters: 8 Moses Kresch - Senior; 13 Seth Deppe - Sophomore

== Schedule ==
TV/Internet Streaming information:

All home games will be streamed on Conference Carolinas DN. Most road games will also be televised or streamed by the schools television or streaming service.

Date time	Opponent	Rank	Arena city (tournament)	Television	Score	Attendance	Record
1/13; 7 p.m.	@ Tusculum		Pioneer Arena; Greenville, TN	FloVolleyball	L 2–3 (25-19, 27-29, 25-19, 23-25, 15-17)	144	0-1
1/14; 2 p.m.	@ Lincoln Memorial		Mary Mars Gymnasium; Harrogate, TN	FloVolleyball	L 0–3 (13-25, 13-25, 19-25)	132	0-2
1/20; 5 p.m.	Randolph-Macon		Wilson Gymnasium; Wilson, NC	Conference Carolinas DN	L 1–3 (15-25, 17-25, 25-21, 19-25)	225	0-3
1/21; 2 p.m.	Merrimack		Wilson Gymnasium; Wilson, NC	Conference Carolinas DN	L 1–3 (22-25, 25-19, 23-25, 20-25)	200	0-4
1/28; 7:30 p.m.	#1 Hawai'i		Wilson Gymnasium; Wilson, NC	Conference Carolinas DN	L 0–3 (11-25, 19-25, 14-25)	795	0-5
2/04; 6 p.m.	Queens		Wilson Gymnasium; Wilson, NC	Conference Carolinas DN	L 1–3 (19-25, 32-30, 25-27, 22-25)	0	0-6
2/10; 7 p.m.	@ North Greenville*		Hayes Gymnasium; Tigerville, SC	Conference Carolinas DN	L 0–3 (21-25, 8-25, 17-25)	208	0-7 (0-1)
2/11; 2 p.m.	@ Belmont Abbey*		Wheeler Center; Belmont, NC	Mountain East Network	L 1–3 (18-25, 25-22, 17-25, 22-25)	105	0-8 (0-2)
2/17; 7 p.m.	Erskine*		Wilson Gymnasium; Wilson, NC	Conference Carolinas DN	L 1–3 (21-25, 23-25, 27-25, 22-25)	150	0-9 (0-3)
2/18; 2 p.m.	Emmanuel*		Wilson Gymnasium; Wilson, NC	Conference Carolinas DN	W 3-1 (26-24, 20-25, 25-19, 25-20)	100	1-9 (1-3)
2/21; 7 p.m.	@ Mount Olive*		Kornegay Arena; Mount Olive, NC	Conference Carolinas DN	L 1–3 (25-23, 19-25, 19-25, 16-25)	304	1-10 (1-4)
2/24; 7 p.m.	Lees-McRae*		Wilson Gymnasium; Wilson, NC	Conference Carolinas DN	W 3-0 (25-23, 25-15, 25-19)	250	2-10 (2-4)
2/25; 2 p.m.	King*		Wilson Gymnasium; Wilson, NC	Conference Carolinas DN	W 3-1 (25-11, 25-20, 23-25, 25-21)	200	3-10 (3-4)
3/04; 5 p.m.	@ George Mason		Recreation Athletic Complex; Fairfax, VA	ESPN+	L 1-3 (19-25, 14-25, 26-24, 16-25)	141	3-11
3/17; 7 p.m.	@ Emmanuel*		Shaw Athletic Center; Franklin Springs, GA	Conference Carolinas DN	L 2-3 (27-25, 16-25, 25-21, 17-25, 9-15)	75	3-12 (3-5)
3/18; 2 p.m.	@ Erskine*		Belk Arena; Due West, SC	Conference Carolinas DN	L 1-3 (16-25, 20-25, 25-20, 18-25)	54	3-13 (3-6)
3/24; 7 p.m.	Belmont Abbey*		Wilson Gymnasium; Wilson, NC	Conference Carolinas DN	L 2-3 (21-25, 16-25, 25-15, 25-19, 13-15)	275	3-14 (3-7)
3/25; 2 p.m.	North Greenville*		Wilson Gymnasium; Wilson, NC	Conference Carolinas DN	L 2-3 (23-25, 25-23, 20-25, 25-20, 6-15)	200	3-15 (3-8)
3/28; 6 p.m.	@ Queens		Curry Arena; Charlotte, NC	ESPN+ or YouTube	L 2-3 (18-25, 25-20, 25-21, 13-25, 10-15)	34	3-16
3/31; 7 p.m.	@ King*		Student Center Complex; Bristol, TN	Conference Carolinas DN	L 0-3 (15-25, 15-25, 25-27)	232	3-17 (3-9)
4/01; 2 p.m.	@ Lees-McRae*		Williams Gymnasium; Banner Elk, NC	Conference Carolinas DN	W 3-2 (25-18, 13-25, 15-25, 25-20, 17-15)	137	4-17 (4-9)
4/07; 7 p.m.	Tusculum		Wilson Gymnasium; Wilson, NC	Conference Carolinas DN	W 3-2 (26-24, 21-25, 19-25, 25-23, 15-12)	200	5-17
4/08; 2 p.m.	Lincoln Memorial		Wilson Gymnasium; Wilson, NC	Conference Carolinas DN	L 0-3 (10-25, 17-25, 19-25)	100	5-18
4/13; 7 p.m.	Mount Olive*		Wilson Gymnasium; Wilson, NC	Conference Carolinas DN	L 0-3 (23-25, 20-25, 28-30)	350	5-19 (4-10)

*-Indicates conference match.
Times listed are Eastern Time Zone.

== Announcers for televised games ==
- Tusculum: Brian Stayton
- Lincoln Memorial: Adam Haley
- Randolph-Macon:
- Merrimack:
- Hawai'i:
- Queens:
- North Greenville:
- Belmont Abbey:
- Erskine:
- Emmanuel:
- Mount Olive:
- Lees-McRae:
- King:
- George Mason:
- Emmanuel:
- Erskine:
- Belmont Abbey:
- North Greenville:
- Queens:
- King:
- Lees-McRae:
- Tusculum:
- Lincoln Memorial:
- Mount Olive:
