= 2023 Mount Olive Trojans men's volleyball team =

American college volleyball season

2023 Mount Olive Trojans men's volleyball
- Conference: Conference Carolinas
- Record: 11–17 (6–8 1st)
- Head coach: Omar Sanchez (1st season)
- Home arena: Kornegay Arena

The 2023 Mount Olive Trojans men's volleyball team represented Mount Olive College in the 2023 NCAA Division I & II men's volleyball season. The Trojans, led by first year head coach Omar Sanchez, were picked to finish third the Conference Carolinas title in the coaches preseason poll.

2023 Conference Carolinas men's volleyball standings
	Conf.				Overall
Team	W		L	PCT	W		L	PCT
North Greenville ‍†‍‍	11	–	3	.786	19	–	8	.704
Erskine ‍‍‍	9	–	5	.643	14	–	13	.519
No. 15 King ‍‍‡‍^{y}	8	–	6	.571	16	–	16	.500
Belmont Abbey ‍‍‍	8	–	6	.571	15	–	16	.484
Lees–McRae ‍‍‍	7	–	7	.500	11	–	15	.423
Mount Olive ‍‍‍	6	–	8	.429	11	–	17	.393
Barton ‍‍‍	4	–	10	.286	5	–	19	.208
Emmanuel ‍‍‍	3	–	11	.214	8	–	20	.286
† – Conference champion ‡ – Conference Carolinas tournament champion y – Invited to the NCAA tournament Rankings from AVCA

== Roster ==
2023 Mount Olive Trojans Roster
Defensive Specialist/Libero: 8 Blake Hosic - Sophomore; 14 Trevor Treser - Senior; Middle Blockers: 6 Holden Maryott - Sophomore; 13 Constantinos Iacovou - Freshman; 21 Pedro Gonzales - Senior	Outside Hitters: 2 Chance Gallardo - Junior; 4 Tyler McConnell - Freshman; 7 Hayden Frear - (redshirt) Senior; 8 Blake Hosic - Sophomore; 10 Tate Sandvig - Sophomore; 15 Tom Klotzbuecher - Justin	Opposite Hitters: 17 Kory Grant - Freshman; 19 Justin Gregory - Junior; Setters: 5 Jackson Lahey - Freshman; 20 Jack Yerxa - Junior; 24 Nathaniel Brownlee - Sophomore

== Schedule ==
TV/Internet Streaming information:

All home games will be streamed on Conference Carolinas DN. Most road games will also be televised or streamed by the schools television or streaming service.

Date Time	Opponent	Rank	Arena City (Tournament)	Television	Score	Attendance	Record
1/12; 7 p.m.	@ Tusculum		Pioneer Arena; Greeneville, TN	FloVolleyball	W 3–1 (25–23, 19–25, 25–19, 25–16)	211	1–0
1/13; 7 p.m.	@ Lincoln Memorial		Mary Mars Gymnasium; Harogate, TN	FloVolleyball	L 0–3 (20–25, 17–25, 20–25)	197	1–1
1/20; 6 p.m.	Merrimack		Kornegay Arena; Mount Olive, NC	Conference Carolinas DN	W 3–0 (25–23, 25–20, 25–21)	121	2–1
1/27; 6 p.m.	@ Morehouse		Forbes Arena; Atlanta, GA	HBCU League Pass+ or None	W 3–0 (25–9, 25–17, 25–12)	100	3–1
1/28; 5 p.m.	@ Fort Valley State		HPE Arena; Fort Valley, GA	FVSU SN	W 3–0 (25–18, 25–20, 25–13)	112	4–1
2/03; 5 p.m.	vs. Purdue Fort Wayne		Recreation Athletic Complex; Fairfax, VA (DC Challenge)		L 0–3 (21–25, 19–25, 25–27)	0	4–2
2/04; 4 p.m.	vs. #14 Lewis		Recreation Athletic Complex; Fairfax, VA (DC Challenge)		L 0–3 (21–25, 14–25, 20–25)		4–3
2/10; 7 p.m.	@ Belmont Abbey*		Wheeler Center; Belmont, NC	Conference Carolinas DN	L 0–3 (14–25, 21–25, 22–25)	125	4–4 (0–1)
2/11; 6 p.m.	@ North Greenville*		Hayes Gymnasium; Tigerville, SC	Conference Carolinas DN	L 0–3 (16–25, 21–25, 21–25)	251	4–5 (0–2)
2/15; 6 p.m.	Queens		Kornegay Arena; Mount Olive, NC	Conference Carolinas DN	L 0–3 (19–25, 17–25, 23–25)	154	4–6
2/17; 7 p.m.	Emmanuel*		Kornegay Arena; Mount Olive, NC	Conference Carolinas DN	L 0–3 (18–25, 21–25, 25–22, 19–25)	85	4–7 (0–3)
2/18; 7 p.m.	Erskine*		Kornegay Arena; Mount Olive, NC	Conference Carolinas DN	L 1–3 (21–25, 22–25, 25–22, 19–25)	77	4–8 (0–4)
2/21; 7 p.m.	Barton*		Kornegay Arena; Mount Olive, NC	Conference Carolinas DN	W 3–1 (23–25, 25–19, 25–19, 25–16)	304	5–8 (1–4)
2/24; 6 p.m.	King*		Kornegay Arena; Mount Olive, NC	Conference Carolinas DN	L 0–3 (19–25, 23–25, 25–27)	123	5–9 (1–5)
2/25; 2 p.m.	Lees-McRae*		Kornegay Arena; Mount Olive, NC	Conference Carolinas DN	L 1–3 (21–25, 22–25, 25–19, 24–26)	64	5–10 (1–6)
3/10; 7 p.m.	@ #14 Charleston (WV)		Russell and Martha Wehrle Innovation Center; Charleston, WV	Mountain East Network	L 2–3 (27–25, 20–25, 18–25, 31–29, 13–15)	120	5–11
3/11; 5 p.m.	@ #14 Charleston (WV)		Russell and Martha Wehrle Innovation Center; Charleston, WV	Mountain East Network	L 0–3 (16–25, 18–25, 19–25)	70	5–12
3/17; 7 p.m.	@ Erskine*		Belk Arena; Due West, SC	Conference Carolinas DN	W 3–1 (25–18, 25–14, 24–26, 25–17)	121	6–12 (2–6)
3/18; 2 p.m.	@ Emmanuel*		Shaw Athletic Center; Franklin Springs, GA	Conference Carolinas DN	W 3–1 (25–17, 24–26, 25–21, 25–20)	67	7–12 (3–6)
3/24; 7 p.m.	North Greenville*		Kornegay Arena; Mount Olive, NC	Conference Carolinas DN	W 3–1 (25–21, 26–24, 27–29, 25–18)	105	8–12 (4–6)
3/25; 2 p.m.	Belmont Abbey*		Kornegay Arena; Mount Olive, NC	Conference Carolinas DN	L 1–3 (23–25, 18–25, 25–14, 17–25)	65	8–13 (4–7)
3/31; 7 p.m.	@ Lees-McRae*		Williams Gymnasium; Banner Elk, NC	Conference Carolinas DN	W 3–0 (25–20, 25–23, 29–27)	137	9–13 (5–7)
4/01; 2 p.m.	@ King*		Student Center Complex; Bristol, TN	Conference Carolinas DN	L 2–3 (22–25, 25–20, 20–25, 25–20, 11–15)	213	9–14 (5–8)
4/04; 6 p.m.	@ Queens		Curry Arena; Charlotte, NC	ESPN+ or YouTube	L 0–3 (22–25, 21–25, 20–25)	77	9–15
4/07; 7 p.m.	Lincoln Memorial		Kornegay Arena; Mount Olive, NC	Conference Carolinas DN	L 1–3 (27–25, 22–25, 22–25, 23–25)	95	9–16
4/08; 3 p.m.	Tusculum		Kornegay Arena; Mount Olive, NC	Conference Carolinas DN	W 3–1 (21–25, 25–13, 25–17, 25–12)	78	10–16
4/13; 7 p.m.	@ Barton*		Wilson Gymnasium; Wilson, NC	Conference Carolinas DN	W 3–0 (25–23, 25–20, 30–28)	350	11–16 (6–8)

*-Indicates conference match.
Times listed are Eastern Time Zone.

== Announcers for televised games ==
- Tusculum: Brian Stayton
- Lincoln Memorial: Adam Haley & Katherine Bedel
- Merrimack: Michael Deleo
- Morehouse:
- Ft. Valley State:
- Belmont Abbey:
- North Grenville:
- Queens:
- Emmanuel:
- Erskine:
- Barton:
- King:
- Lees-McRae:
- Charleston (WV):
- Charleston (WV):
- Erskine:
- Emmanuel:
- North Greenville:
- Belmont Abbey:
- Lees-McRae:
- King:
- Queens:
- Lincoln Memorial:
- Tusculum:
- Barton:
