= 2023 Morehouse Maroon Tigers volleyball team =

American college volleyball season

2023 Morehouse Maroon Tigers men's volleyball
- Conference: Southern Intercollegiate Athletic Conference
- Record: 0–18 (0–10 SIAC)
- Head coach: Ashley Johnson (1st season)
- Home arena: Forbes Arena

The 2023 Morehouse Maroon Tigers volleyball team, the second ever Morehouse volleyball team represents Morehouse College in the 2023 NCAA Division I & II men's volleyball season. The Maroon Tigers, led by first year head coach Ashley Johnson, play their home games at Forbes Arena. The Maroon Tigers compete as members of the Southern Intercollegiate Athletic Conference. Morehouse was picked to finish sixth in the 2023 SIAC preseason poll.

2023 Southern Intercollegiate Athletic Conference men's volleyball standings
| | Conf. | | | | Overall |
| Team | W | | L | PCT | W | | L | PCT |
|---|---|---|---|---|---|---|---|---|
| Edward Waters ‍†‍‡‍ | 10 | – | 0 | 1.000 | 14 | – | 4 | .778 |
| Central State (OH) ‍‍‍ | 8 | – | 2 | .800 | 17 | – | 14 | .548 |
| Benedict ‍‍‍ | 6 | – | 5 | .545 | 11 | – | 8 | .579 |
| Fort Valley State ‍‍‍ | 4 | – | 6 | .400 | 7 | – | 19 | .269 |
| Kentucky State ‍‍‍ | 2 | – | 8 | .200 | 3 | – | 26 | .103 |
| Morehouse ‍‍‍ | 0 | – | 11 | .000 | 0 | – | 19 | .000 |
† – Conference champion ‡ – SIAC tournament champion

== Season highlights ==
- Will be filled in as the season progresses.

== Roster ==
2023 Morehouse Maroon Tigers roster
| Defensive specialist/libero: 1 Jalen Campbell - Junior; 5 Rahsan Butler - Junior; Middle blockers: 8 Chase Armstrong - Sophomore; 14 Nasir Barnes - Sophomore; 15 Aidan Pullian - Sophomore | Outside hitters: 18 Williams Babalola - Senior; 13 Kristopher Woods - Sophomore; 14 Nasir Barnes - Sophomore; 17 Bryce Clemons - Sophomore; 12 Devyn Hardwick - Freshman | Setters: 7 Camden Kirkman-Page - Freshman |

== Schedule ==
TV/Internet Streaming information:

Select home games will be streamed on HBCU League Pass+. Most road games will also be streamed by the schools streaming service.

| Date time | Opponent (Seed) | Rank (Seed) | Arena city (tournament) | Television | Score | Attendance | Record |
|---|---|---|---|---|---|---|---|
| 1/27; 6 p.m. | Mount Olive | | Forbes Arena; Atlanta, GA | HBCU League Pass+ | L 0-3 (9-25, 17–25, 12–25) | 100 | 0-1 |
| 1/28; 1:30 p.m. | vs. Rio Grande | | Brown Athletic Center; Waleska, GA | Presto Sports | L 0-3 (20–25, 16–25, 17–25) | 0 | 0-2 |
| 1/28; 4 p.m. | @ Reinhardt | | Brown Athletic Center; Waleska, GA | Presto Sports | L 0-3 (11–25, 17–25, 11–25) | 50 | 0-3 |
| 2/07; 7 p.m. | Life | | Forbes Arena; Atlanta, GA | HBCU League Pass+ | L 0-3 (14–25, 10–25, 13–25) | 40 | 0-4 |
| 2/10; 7 p.m. | @ St. Andrews | | Harris Court; Laurinburg, NC | SAU SN on Stretch | L 0-3 (10–25, 23–25, 20–25) | 0 | 0-5 |
| 2/24; 6 p.m. | Benedict* | | Forbes Arena; Atlanta, GA | HBCU League Pass+ | L 0-3 (10–25, 10–25, 23–25) | | 0-6 (0–1) |
| 2/25; 2 p.m. | Tusculum | | Forbes Arena; Atlanta, GA | HBCU League Pass+ | L 0-3 (11–25, 14–25, 18–25) | 25 | 0-7 |
| 3/04; 2 p.m. | @ Central State* | | Beacom/Lewis Gym; Wilberforce, OH | Central State All-Access | L 0-3 (9-25, 14–25, 21–25) | 105 | 0-8 (0–2) |
| 3/04; 6:30 p.m. | @ Kentucky State* | | Bell Gymnasium; Frankfort, KY | Stellascope | L 0-3 (12–25, 17–25, 21–25) | 44 | 0-9 (0–3) |
| 3/10; 7 p.m. | Belmont Abbey | | Forbes Arena; Atlanta, GA | HBCU League Pass+ | L 0-3 (9-25, 9-25, 3-25) | 45 | 0-10 |
| 3/14; 6 p.m. | Fort Valley State* | | Forbes Arena; Atlanta, GA | HBCU League Pass+ | L 0-3 (15–25, 13–25, 15–25) | 50 | 0-11 (0–4) |
| 3/18; 2 p.m. | @ Benedict* | | HRC Center; Columbia, SC | HBCU League Pass+ | L 0-3 (21–25, 15–25, 11–25) | 50 | 0-12 (0–5) |
| 3/21; 6 p.m. | Edward Waters* | | Forbes Arena; Atlanta, GA | HBCU League Pass+ | L 0-3 (10–25, 9-25, 15–25) | 30 | 0-13 (0–6) |
| 3/22; 7 p.m. | @ Life | | Upper Gym; Marietta, GA | YouTube | L 0-3 (13–25, 18–25, 18–25) | 0 | 0-14 |
| 3/30; 6 p.m. | @ Fort Valley State* | | HPE Arena; Fort Valley, GA | HBCU League Pass+ | L 0-3 (12–25, 21–25, 13–25) | 58 | 0-15 (0–7) |
| 4/06; 6 p.m. | Kentucky State* | | Forbes Arena; Atlanta, GA | HBCU League Pass+ | L 1-3 (20–25, 19–25, 25–22, 20–25) | 45 | 0-16 (0–8) |
| 4/07; 6 p.m. | Central State* | | Forbes Arena; Atlanta, GA | HBCU League Pass+ | L 0-3 (21–25, 14–25, 14–25) | 40 | 0-17 (0–9) |
| 4/14; 6 p.m. | @ Edward Waters* | | Adams-Jenkins Complex; Jacksonville, FL | YouTube | L 0-3 (13–25, 16–25, 14–25) | 35 | 0-18 (0–10) |

*-Indicates conference match.
Times listed are Eastern Time Zone.

== Announcers for televised games ==
- Mount Olive:
- Reinhardt:
- Reinhardt:
- Life:
- St. Andrews:
- Benedict:
- Tusculum:
- Tusculum:
- Kentucky State:
- Central State:
- Belmont Abbey:
- Fort Valley State:
- Benedict:
- Life:
- Edward Waters:
- Central State:
- Kentucky State:
- Edward Waters:
