= 2023 King Tornado men's volleyball team =

American college volleyball season

2023 King Tornado men's volleyball

Conference Carolinas Tournament Champions

NCAA Tournament, First Round
- Conference: Conference Carolinas
- Record: 16-16 (8-6 Conference Carolinas)
- Head coach: Ryan Booher (14th season)
- Assistant coaches: Cassady Cook (1st season); Caleb Helms (1st season)
- Home arena: Student Center Complex

The 2023 King Tornadoes men's volleyball team represented King University in the 2023 NCAA Division I & II men's volleyball season. The Tornadoes, led by 14th year head coach Ryan Booher, were picked to finish second in the Conference Carolinas coaches preseason poll.

2023 Conference Carolinas men's volleyball standings
	Conf.				Overall
Team	W		L	PCT	W		L	PCT
North Greenville ‍†‍‍	11	–	3	.786	19	–	8	.704
Erskine ‍‍‍	9	–	5	.643	14	–	13	.519
No. 15 King ‍‍‡‍^{y}	8	–	6	.571	16	–	16	.500
Belmont Abbey ‍‍‍	8	–	6	.571	15	–	16	.484
Lees-McRae ‍‍‍	7	–	7	.500	11	–	15	.423
Mount Olive ‍‍‍	6	–	8	.429	11	–	17	.393
Barton ‍‍‍	4	–	10	.286	5	–	19	.208
Emmanuel ‍‍‍	3	–	11	.214	8	–	20	.286
† – Conference champion ‡ – 2023 Conference Carolinas Tournament champion: y- Invited to the NCAA volleyball tournament As of March 13, 2025 Rankings from AVCA

== Roster ==
2023 King Tornado roster
Defensive specialist/libero: 7 Gabriel Cabanzon - Freshman; 8 Gannon Chinen - Sophomore; Middle blockers: 6 Aaron Milstead - Senior; 11 Sean Haberthy - Sophomore; 14 Kellan Kennedy - Junior; 17 Aiden Swatzell - Junior; 20 Henry Okoye - Junior	Outside hitters: 3 Warren Davis - Junior; 5 Justin Sawyer - Sophomore; 9 Jackson Carroll - Senior; 13 Colton Bueter - Freshman; 15 Mason Martindale - Freshman; 25 Bryce Pickett - Junior	Opposite hitters: 3 Warren Davis - Junior; 5 Justin Sawyer - Sophomore; 6 Aaron Milstead - Senior; 10 AJ Drooker - Junior; 25 Bryce Pickett - Junior; Setters: 1 Juan Alcoba - Junior; 10 AJ Drooker - Junior; 18 Noah Phillips - Sophomore; 23 Jack Sarnowski - Senior

== Schedule ==
TV/Internet Streaming information:

All home games will be streamed on Conference Carolinas DN. Most road games will also be televised or streamed by the schools television or streaming service.

Date time	Opponent	Rank	Arena city (tournament)	Television	Score	Attendance	Record
1/06; 7 p.m.	@ Purdue Fort Wayne		Hilliard Gates Sports Center; Fort Wayne, IN	ESPN+	L 0–3 (22–25, 17–25, 14–25)	334	0–1
1/11; 8 p.m.	@ #15 Lewis		Neil Carey Arena; Romeoville, IL	GLVC SN	L 0–3 (19–25, 16–25, 15–25)	350	0–2
1/12; 4 p.m.	@ #12 Loyola Chicago		Joseph J. Gentile Arena; Chicago, IL	ESPN+	L 0–3 (20–25, 20–25, 18–25)	177	0–3
1/13; 10:30 p.m.	@ #3 Long Beach State		Walter Pyramid; Long Beach, CA		L 0–3 (17–25, 12–25, 14–25)	1,516	0-4
1/14; 4 p.m.	vs. #11 USC		Walter Pyramid; Long Beach, CA		L 0–3 (16–25, 17–25, 16–25)	416	0-5
1/19; 7 p.m.	Quincy		Student Center Complex; Bristol, TN	Conference Carolinas DN	W 3-1 (21–25, 25–19, 27–25, 25–22)	178	1-5
1/20; 4 p.m.	Limestone*		Student Center Complex; Bristol, TN	Conference Carolinas DN	L 1–3 (24–26, 21–25, 25–22, 19–25)	137	1-6
1/21; 12 p.m.	Charleston (WV)*		Student Center Complex; Bristol, TN	Conference Carolinas DN	L 0–3 (22–25, 14–25, 16–25)	189	1-7
1/24; 7 p.m.	@ Tusculum		Pioneer Gymnasium; Greenville, TN	FloVolleyball	W 3-2 (25–18, 25–17, 22–25, 22–25, 15–12)	333	2-7
1/27; 6 p.m.	@ Fort Valley State		HPE Arena; Fort Valley, GA	Team 1 Sports	W 3-2 (23–25, 25–22, 29–27, 17–25, 19–17)	117	3-7
1/31; 7 p.m.	@ Lincoln Memorial		Mary Mars Gymnasium; Harrogate, TN	FloVolleyball	L 0–3 (18–25, 24–26, 19–25)	110	3-8
2/03; 6 p.m.	@ Queens		Curry Arena; Charlotte, NC	ESPN+ or YouTube	W 3-1 (25–20, 25–27, 25–21, 25–18)	123	4-8
2/04; 5 p.m.	Fort Valley State		Student Center Complex; Bristol, TN	Conference Carolinas DN	W 3-2 (25–16, 25–27, 26–24, 24–26, 15–12)	146	5-8
2/08; 7 p.m.	North Greenville*		Student Center Complex; Bristol, TN	Conference Carolinas DN	W 3-2 (19–25, 23–25, 26–24, 25–23, 15–8)	231	6-8 (1–0)
2/10; 7 p.m.	Emmanuel*		Student Center Complex; Bristol, TN	Conference Carolinas DN	W 3-1 (25–20, 25–21, 22–25, 25–15)	174	7-8 (2–0)
2/11; 7 p.m.	Erskine*		Student Center Complex; Bristol, TN	Conference Carolinas DN	W 3-2 (27–25, 25–19, 24–26, 22–25, 15–8)	231	8-8 (3–0)
2/14; 7 p.m.	@ Lees-McRae*		Williams Gymnasium; Banner Elk, NC	Conference Carolinas DN	L 2-3 (21–25, 25–23, 27–25, 15–25, 16–18)	203	8-9 (3–1)
2/16; 7 p.m.	@ Belmont Abbey*		Wheeler Center; Belmont, NC	Conference Carolinas DN	L 1-3 (19–25, 24–26, 25–15, 23–25)	114	8-10 (3–2)
2/18; 5 p.m.	@ George Mason		Recreation Athletic Center; Fairfax, VA	ESPN+	L 0-3 (15–25, 16–25, 17–25)	0	8-11
2/24; 7 p.m.	@ Mount Olive*		Kornegay Arena; Mount Olive, NC	Conference Carolinas DN	W 3-0 (25–19, 25–23, 27–25)	123	9-11 (4–2)
2/25; 2 p.m.	@ Barton*		Wilson Gymnasium; Wilson, NC	Conference Carolinas DN	L 1-3 (11–25, 20–25, 25–23, 21–25)	200	9-12 (4–3)
2/28; 7 p.m.	Lincoln Memorial		Student Center Complex; Bristol, TN	Conference Carolinas DN			
3/01; 6 p.m.	Queens		Student Center Complex; Bristol, TN	Conference Carolinas DN			
3/10; 8 p.m.	@ McKendree		Melvin Price Convocation Center; Lebanon, IL	GLVC SN			
3/11; 8 p.m.	@ Lindenwood		Robert F. Hyland Arena; St. Charles, MO	ESPN+			
3/14; 7 p.m.	Belmont Abbey*		Student Center Complex; Bristol, TN	Conference Carolinas DN	W 3-2 (23–25, 33–31, 25–17, 18–25, 15–11)	284	10-12 (5–3)
3/16; 4 p.m.	NJIT		Student Center Complex; Bristol, TN	Conference Carolinas DN			
3/17; 4 p.m.	St. Francis		Student Center Complex; Bristol, TN	Conference Carolinas DN			
3/21; 7 p.m.	@ North Greenville*		Hayes Gymnasium; Tigerville, SC	Conference Carolinas DN	L 1-3 (16–25, 25–22, 24–26, 24–26)	226	10-13 (5–4)
3/23; 7 p.m.	@ Emmanuel*		Shaw Athletic Center; Franklin Springs, GA	Conference Carolinas DN	W 3-1 (27–25, 25–13, 22–25, 25–13)	125	11-13 (6–4)
3/24; 7 p.m.	@ Erskine*		Belk Arena; Due West, SC	Conference Carolinas DN	L 2-3 (23–25, 31–29, 20–25, 25–23, 14–16)		11-14 (6–5)
3/31; 7 p.m.	Barton*		Student Center Complex; Bristol, TN	Conference Carolinas DN	W 3-0 (25–15, 25–15, 27–25)	232	12-14 (7–5)
4/01; 2 p.m.	Mount Olive*		Student Center Complex; Bristol, TN	Conference Carolinas DN	W 3-2 (25–22, 20–25, 25–20, 20–25, 15–11)	213	13-14 (8–5)
4/13; 7 p.m.	Lees-McRae*		Student Center Complex; Bristol, TN	Conference Carolinas DN	L 1-3 (18–25, 25–14, 21–25, 23–25)	241	13-15 (8–6)
5/2; 6 p.m.	#9 Ohio State		EagleBank Arena; Fairfax, VA (NCAA First Round)	ESPN+	L 0-3 (20–25, 16–25, 34–36)	1,910	16-16

*-Indicates conference match.
Times listed are Eastern Time Zone.

== Announcers for televised games ==
- Purdue Fort Wayne: Mike Maahs & Victoria Brisack
- Lewis: Allie Lankowicz & Chloe Fornetti
- Loyola Chicago: Scott Sudikoff & Ray Gooden
- Quincy:
- Limestone:
- Charleston (WV):
- Tusculum:
- Fort Valley State:
- Lincoln Memorial:
- Queens:
- Fort Valley State:
- North Greenville:
- Emmanuel:
- Erskine:
- Lees-McRae:
- Belmont Abbey:
- George Mason:
- Mount Olive:
- Barton:
- Lincoln Memorial:
- Queens:
- McKendree:
- Lindenwood:
- Belmont Abbey:
- NJIT:
- St. Francis:
- North Greenville:
- Erskine:
- Emmanuel:
- Barton:
- Mount Olive:
- Tusculum:
- Lees-McRae:

== Rankings ==
Ranking movements Legend: ██ Increase in ranking ██ Decrease in ranking RV = Received votes
	Week																	
Poll	Pre	1	2	3	4	5	6	7	8	9	10	11	12	13	14	15	16	Final
AVCA Coaches																	RV	15
Off the Block Media	Not released									RV								RV

^The Media did not release a Pre-season or Week 1 poll.
