= 2023 Lees–McRae Bobcats men's volleyball team =

American college volleyball season

2023 Lees–McRae Bobcats men's volleyball
- Conference: Conference Carolinas
- Record: 11–14 (7–7 Conference Carolinas)
- Head coach: Sam Albus (1st season)
- Assistant coach: Abigail King (2nd season)
- Home arena: Williams Gymnasium

The 2023 Lees–McRae Bobcats men's volleyball team represented Lees–McRae College in the 2023 NCAA Division I & II men's volleyball season. The Bobcats, led by first year head coach Sam Albus, were picked to finish seventh in the Conference Carolinas coaches preseason poll.

2023 Conference Carolinas men's volleyball standings
	Conf.				Overall
Team	W		L	PCT	W		L	PCT
North Greenville ‍†‍‍	11	–	3	.786	19	–	8	.704
Erskine ‍‍‍	9	–	5	.643	14	–	13	.519
No. 15 King ‍‍‡‍^{y}	8	–	6	.571	16	–	16	.500
Belmont Abbey ‍‍‍	8	–	6	.571	15	–	16	.484
Lees-McRae ‍‍‍	7	–	7	.500	11	–	15	.423
Mount Olive ‍‍‍	6	–	8	.429	11	–	17	.393
Barton ‍‍‍	4	–	10	.286	5	–	19	.208
Emmanuel ‍‍‍	3	–	11	.214	8	–	20	.286
† – Conference champion ‡ – Conference Carolinas tournament champion y – Invited to the NCAA tournament Rankings from AVCA

== Roster ==
2023 Lees-McRae Bobcats roster
Defensive specialist/libero: 1 Ben Ratliff-Becher - Freshman; 3 Isaac LaFunor - Sophomore; 5 Steven Nalls - Senior; Middle blockers: 6 Nicholas Brewster - Junior; 10 Vincent Pradarelli - Freshman; 12 Sebastian Heer - Sophomore; 15 Ace Backer - Senior	Outside hitters: 2 M.J. Doyle - Senior; 4 Joe Angelo - Senior; 6 Nicholas Brewster - Junior; 7 Michael Marsans - Senior; 17 Thomas Couch - Sophomore; 18 Austin Beaird - Freshman	Opposite hitters: 10 Vincent Pradarelli - Freshman; Setters: 11 Bradley Peters - Senior; 18 Austin Beaird - Freshman

== Schedule ==
TV/Internet Streaming information:

All home games will be streamed on Conference Carolinas DN. Most road games will also be televised or streamed by the schools television or streaming service.

Date time	Opponent	Rank	Arena city (tournament)	Television	Score	Attendance	Record
1/18; 6 p.m.	@ Queens		Curry Arena; Charlotte, NC	YouTube	L 0–3 (23–25, 15–25, 19–25)	94	0–1
1/21; 7 p.m.	Limestone		Williams Gymnasium; Banner Elk, NC	Conference Carolinas DN	W 3-2 (25-19, 23–25, 28–26, 24-26, 15-8)	113	1-1
1/28; 3 p.m.	St. Andrews		Williams Gymnasium; Banner Elk, NC	Conference Carolinas DN	W 3-0 (25-21, 25–18, 25–17)	116	2-1
1/31; 9 p.m.	@ #9 Grand Canyon		GCU Arena; Phoenix, AZ	ESPN+	L 0–3 (18–25, 17–25, 19–25)	386	2-2
2/01; 9 p.m.	@ #9 Grand Canyon		GCU Arena; Phoenix, AZ	ESPN+	L 0–3 (25-23, 14–25, 17–25, 20-25)	346	2-3
2/02; 7 p.m.	@ Park University Gilbert		Bell Bean Park; Gilbert, AZ	YouTube	W 3-0 (25-20, 25–19, 25–18)	50	3-3
2/10; 7 p.m.	Erskine*		Williams Gymnasium; Banner Elk, NC	Conference Carolinas DN	W 3-0 (28-26, 25–23, 25–12)	231	4-3 (1-0)
2/11; 2 p.m.	Emmanuel*		Williams Gymnasium; Banner Elk, NC	Conference Carolinas DN	W 3-1 (21-25, 25–20, 25-18, 25-20)	203	5-3 (2-0)
2/14; 7 p.m.	King*		Williams Gymnasium; Banner Elk, NC	Conference Carolinas DN	W 3-2 (25-21, 23–25, 25-27, 25-15, 18-16)	203	6-3 (3-0)
2/16; 7 p.m.	Fort Valley State		Williams Gymnasium; Banner Elk, NC	Conference Carolinas DN	L 1-3 (23-25, 13-25, 25-15, 23-25)	203	6-4
2/18; 2 p.m.	@ North Greenville*		Hayes Gymnasium; Tigerville, SC	Conference Carolinas DN	L 1-3 (17-25, 25-21, 23-25, 20-25)	212	6-5 (3-1)
2/24; 7 p.m.	@ Barton*		Wilson Gymnasium; Wilson, NC	Conference Carolinas DN	L 0-3 (23-25, 15-25, 19-25)	250	6-6 (3-2)
2/25; 2 p.m.	@ Mount Olive*		Kornegay Arena; Mount Olive, NC	Conference Carolinas DN	W 3-1 (25-21, 25-22, 19-25, 26-24)	64	7-6 (4-2)
2/28; 7 p.m.	Tusculum		Williams Gymnasium; Banner Elk, NC	Conference Carolinas DN	L 0-3 (17-25, 21-25, 23-25)	103	7-7
3/02; 6 p.m.	Queens		Williams Gymnasium; Banner Elk, NC	Conference Carolinas DN	L 0-3 (23-25, 22-25, 22-25)	113	7-8
3/04; 2 p.m.	Randolph-Macon		Williams Gymnasium; Banner Elk, NC	Conference Carolinas DN	W 3-0 (25-14, 25-20, 25-17)	117	8-8
3/18; 2 p.m.	@ Belmont Abbey*		Wheeler Center; Belmont, NC	Conference Carolinas DN	L 0-3 (20-25, 15-25, 29-31)	74	8-9 (4-3)
3/24; 7 p.m.	@ Emmanuel*		Shaw Athletic Center; Franklin Springs, GA	Conference Carolinas DN	L 2-3 (25-16, 16-25, 30-28, 22-25, 13-15)	100	8-11 (4-4)
3/25; 2 p.m.	@ Erskine*		Belk Arena; Due West, SC	Conference Carolinas DN	W 3-1 (22-25, 25-22, 25-22, 28-26)	98	9-11 (5-4)
3/28; 7 p.m.	North Greenville*		Williams Gymnasium; Banner Elk, NC	Conference Carolinas DN	L 1-3 (30-32, 23-25, 25-21, 18-25)	107	9-12 (5-5)
3/31; 7 p.m.	Mount Olive*		Williams Gymnasium; Banner Elk, NC	Conference Carolinas DN	L 0-3 (20-25, 23-25, 27-29)	137	9-13 (5-6)
4/01; 2 p.m.	Barton*		Williams Gymnasium; Banner Elk, NC	Conference Carolinas DN	L 2-3 (18-25, 25-13, 25-15, 20-25, 15-17)	137	9-14 (5-7)
4/05; 7 p.m.	Belmont Abbey*		Williams Gymnasium; Banner Elk, NC	Conference Carolinas DN	W 3-1 (25-18, 20-25, 25-21, 25-22)	200	10-14 (6-7)
4/13; 7 p.m.	@ King*		Student Center Complex; Bristol, TN	Conference Carolinas DN	W 3-1 (25-18, 14-25, 25-21, 25-23)	241	11-14 (7-7)

*-Indicates conference match.
Times listed are Eastern Time Zone.
