= 2023 North Greenville Crusaders men's volleyball team =

American college volleyball season

2023 North Greenville Crusaders men's volleyball

Conference Carolinas Regular Season Champions
- Conference: Conference Carolinas
- Record: 18-7 (11-3 Conference Carolinas)
- Head coach: Matthew McManaway (1st season)
- Home arena: Hayes Gymnasium

The 2023 North Greenville Crusaders men's volleyball team represented North Greenville University in the 2023 NCAA Division I & II men's volleyball season. The Crusaders, led by first year head coach Matthew McManaway, were picked to win the Conference Carolinas title in the coaches preseason poll.

2023 Conference Carolinas men's volleyball standings
	Conf.				Overall
Team	W		L	PCT	W		L	PCT
North Greenville ‍†‍‍	11	–	3	.786	19	–	8	.704
Erskine ‍‍‍	9	–	5	.643	14	–	13	.519
No. 15 King ‍‍‡‍^{y}	8	–	6	.571	16	–	16	.500
Belmont Abbey ‍‍‍	8	–	6	.571	15	–	16	.484
Lees-McRae ‍‍‍	7	–	7	.500	11	–	15	.423
Mount Olive ‍‍‍	6	–	8	.429	11	–	17	.393
Barton ‍‍‍	4	–	10	.286	5	–	19	.208
Emmanuel ‍‍‍	3	–	11	.214	8	–	20	.286
† – Conference champion ‡ – 2023 Conference Carolinas Tournament champion: y- Invited to the NCAA volleyball tournament As of March 13, 2025 Rankings from AVCA

== Roster ==
2023 North Greenville Crusaders roster
Defensive specialist/libero: 2 Jackson Chadwell - Freshman; 4 Blake Petteway - Sophomore; 6 Duncan Henderson- Junior; 7 Andrew Davidson- Sophomore; 24 Jhavier Delgado - Freshman; Middle blockers: 16 Emanuel Adames - Junior; 20 Michael de la Cruz Sophomore; 21 Nicholas Rudge - Sophomore	Outside hitters: 5 Luke Densmore - Junior; 8 Tom Curry - Junior; 9 Diego Rosich - Senior; 10 Abhi Kopecky - Freshman; 11 Zec Johnson - Junior; 13 Jared Doebler - Freshman; 14 Gregory Torres- Sophomore; 18 Tyler Cohen - (redshirt) Freshman; 19 Yoriano Velez - Freshman	Opposite hitters: 12 Mark Autry - Junior; 14 Gregory Torres- Sophomore; 22 Jacob Brown- Freshman; Setters: 1 Jorge Riesgo - Junior; 3 Dylan Roseberry - Freshman; 18 Tyler Cohen - (redshirt) Freshman; 23 Elijah Hagen - Freshman

== Schedule ==
TV/Internet Streaming information:

All home games will be streamed on Conference Carolinas DN. Most road games will also be televised or streamed by the schools television or streaming service.

Date time	Opponent	Rank	Arena city (tournament)	Television	Score	Attendance	Record
1/14; 3 p.m.	Queens		Hayes Gymnasium; Tigerville, SC	Conference Carolinas DN	W 3-0 (25-21, 25–19, 25–21)	403	1-0
1/19; 7 p.m.	Tusculum		Hayes Gymnasium; Tigerville, SC	Conference Carolinas DN	W 3-0 (25-19, 32–30, 25–13)	276	2-0
1/25; 7 p.m.	Limestone		Hayes Gymnasium; Tigerville, SC	Conference Carolinas DN	W 3-0 (25-14, 25–20, 25–20)	283	3-0
1/27; 7 p.m.	@ Harvard		Malkin Athletic Center; Cambridge, MA	ESPN+	L 0-3 (22-25, 24–26, 23–25)	0	3-1
1/28; 4 p.m.	vs. St. Francis		Malkin Athletic Center; Cambridge, MA		W 3-2 (25-16, 19–25, 25–23, 19–25, 16–14)	0	4-1
2/01; 6 p.m.	@ Limestone		Timken Center; Gaffney, SC	FloVolleyball	L 2-3 (25-21, 25–20, 22–25, 19–25, 14–16)	68	4-2
2/03; 6 p.m.	Campbellsville		Hayes Gymnasium; Tigerville, SC	Conference Carolinas DN	W 3-0 (25-14, 25–21, 25–9)	183	5-2
2/08; 7 p.m.	@ King*		Student Center Complex; Bristol, TN	Conference Carolinas DN	L 2-3 (25-19, 25–23, 24–26, 13–25, 8–15)	231	5-3 (0-1)
2/10; 7 p.m.	Barton*		Hayes Gymnasium; Tigerville, SC	Conference Carolinas DN	W 3-0 (25-21, 25–8, 25–17)	208	6-3 (1-1)
2/11; 5 p.m.	Mount Olive*		Hayes Gymnasium; Tigerville, SC	Conference Carolinas DN	W 3-0 (25-16, 25–21, 25–21)	251	7-3 (2-1)
2/14; 7 p.m.	Belmont Abbey*		Hayes Gymnasium; Tigerville, SC	Conference Carolinas DN	W 3-1 (20-25, 25–21, 25–22, 27–25)	158	8-3 (3-1)
2/18; 2 p.m.	Lees-McRae*		Hayes Gymnasium; Tigerville, SC	Conference Carolinas DN	W 3-1 (25-17, 21–25, 25–23, 25–20)	212	9-3 (4-1)
2/21; 7 p.m.	@ Erskine*		Belk Arena; Due West, SC	Conference Carolinas DN	L 1-3 (25-16, 20–25, 22–25, 21–25)	231	9-4 (4-2)
2/25; 2 p.m.	@ Emmanuel*		Shaw Athletic Center; Franklin Springs, GA	Conference Carolinas DN	W 3-2 (21-25, 25–19, 21–25, 25–18, 15–12)	50	10-4 (5-2)
3/03; 7 p.m.	@ George Mason		Recreation Athletic Complex; Fairfax, VA	ESPN+	L 0-3 (16-25, 19–25, 22–25)	195	10-5
3/10; 7 p.m.	@ Tusculum		Pioneer Arena; Greenville, TN	FloVolleyball	W 3-0 (25-22, 25–19, 25–19)	136	11-5
3/13; 6 p.m.	Reinhardt		Hayes Gymnasium; Tigerville, SC	Conference Carolinas DN	W 3-0 (25-23, 25–17, 25–17)	97	12-5
3/14; 3 p.m.	NJIT		Hayes Gymnasium; Tigerville, SC	Conference Carolinas DN	L 2-3 (25-20, 25–22, 15–25, 23–25, 13–15)	86	12-6
3/21; 7 p.m.	King*		Hayes Gymnasium; Tigerville, SC	Conference Carolinas DN	W 3-1 (25-16, 22–25, 26–24, 26–24)	226	13-6 (6-2)
3/24; 7 p.m.	@ Mount Olive*		Kornegay Arena; Mount Olive, NC	Conference Carolinas DN	L 1-3 (21-25, 24–26, 29–27, 18–25)	105	13-7 (6-3)
3/25; 2 p.m.	@ Barton*		Wilson Gymnasium; Wilson, NC	Conference Carolinas DN	W 3-2 (25-23, 23–25, 25–20, 20–25, 15–6)	200	14-7 (7-3)
3/28; 7 p.m.	@ Lees-McRae*		Williams Gymnasium; Banner Elk, NC	Conference Carolinas DN	W 3-1 (32-30, 25–23, 21–25, 25–18)	107	15-7 (8-3)
4/01; 2 p.m.	Erskine*		Hayes Gymnasium; Tigerville, SC	Conference Carolinas DN	W 3-0 (25-19, 25–23, 25–14)	280	16-7 (9-3)
4/05; 7 p.m.	Emmanuel*		Hayes Gymnasium; Tigerville, SC	Conference Carolinas DN	W 3-0 (25-19, 25–17, 25–18)	301	17-7 (10-3)
4/13; 7 p.m.	@ Belmont Abbey*		Wheeler Center; Belmont, NC	Conference Carolinas DN	W 3-1 (25-12, 22–25, 25–18, 25–21)	177	18-7 (11-3)

*-Indicates conference match.
Times listed are Eastern Time Zone.

== Announcers for televised games ==
- Queens: Alan Kahaly
- Tusculum:
- Limestone:
- Harvard:
- Limestone:
- Campbellsville:
- King:
- Barton:
- Belmont Abbey:
- Lees-McRae:
- Erskine:
- Emmanuel:
- George Mason:
- Lees-McRae:
- Tusculum:
- Reinhardt:
- NJIT:
- King:
- Mount Olive:
- Barton:
- Erskine:
- Emmanuel:
- Belmont Abbey:

== Rankings ==
Ranking movements Legend: RV = Received votes
	Week																	
Poll	Pre	1	2	3	4	5	6	7	8	9	10	11	12	13	14	15	16	Final
AVCA Coaches																		
Off the Block Media	Not released															RV		

^The Media did not release a Pre-season or Week 1 poll.
