= 2023 Erskine Flying Fleet men's volleyball team =

American college volleyball season

2023 Erskine Flying Fleet men's volleyball
- Conference: Conference Carolinas
- Record: 14-12 (9-5 Conference Carolinas)
- Head coach: Justin Brubaker (6th season)
- Assistant coach: Tyler Wanner (1st season)
- Home arena: Belk Arena

The 2023 Erskine Flying Fleet men's volleyball team represented Erskine College in the 2023 NCAA Division I & II men's volleyball season. The Flying Fleet, led by sixth year head coach Justin Brubaker, were picked to finish sixth in the Conference Carolinas coaches preseason poll.

2023 Conference Carolinas men's volleyball standings
	Conf.				Overall
Team	W		L	PCT	W		L	PCT
North Greenville ‍†‍‍	11	–	3	.786	19	–	8	.704
Erskine ‍‍‍	9	–	5	.643	14	–	13	.519
No. 15 King ‍‍‡‍^{y}	8	–	6	.571	16	–	16	.500
Belmont Abbey ‍‍‍	8	–	6	.571	15	–	16	.484
Lees-McRae ‍‍‍	7	–	7	.500	11	–	15	.423
Mount Olive ‍‍‍	6	–	8	.429	11	–	17	.393
Barton ‍‍‍	4	–	10	.286	5	–	19	.208
Emmanuel ‍‍‍	3	–	11	.214	8	–	20	.286
† – Conference champion ‡ – 2023 Conference Carolinas Tournament champion y- Invited to the NCAA volleyball tournament Rankings from AVCA

== Roster ==
2023 Erskine Flying Fleet roster
Defensive specialist/libero: 3 Mikey Widmyer - Freshman; 4 Alex Ruiz - Sophomore; 10 Tristan Gaddy- Freshman; 22 Justin Rendon - (redshirt) Senior; Middle blockers: 5 Davi Ramos - Freshman; 9 Wiktor Ankurowski - Freshman; 18 Benjamin Jansen - (redshirt) Junior; 19 Logyn Wells - Freshman; 24 Shayo Asiru - Sophomore; 26 Jon Fuller - (redshirt) Junior; 27 Jacob Mullen - Freshman	Outside hitters: 1 Noah Van - Junior; 6 Casey DiRisio - Freshman; 13 Kacper Rybarczyk - Junior; 20 Pablo Zamar - Sophomore; 21 Kaleb Hinson - Freshman; 23 Aidon Love - Sophomore; 25 Joshua Carlos - Sophomore; 28 Edgerrin Austin - (redshirt) Junior	Opposite hitters: 11 Jason Sall - (redshirt) Junior; 14 Tome Filkov- (redshirt) Junior; 29 Charles Byrd - Freshman; Setters: 2 Umar Abdullah - (redshirt) Junior; 8 Michael Moscatelli - (redshirt) Junior; 12 Gino Briglio - Freshman; 15 Francisco Pomar - (redshirt) Junior

== Future players ==
- True Bauer

== Schedule ==
TV/Internet Streaming information:

All home games will be streamed on Conference Carolinas DN. Most road games will also be televised or streamed by the schools television or streaming service.

Date time	Opponent	Rank	Arena city (tournament)	Television	Score	Attendance	Record
1/06; 7 p.m.	Tusculum		Belk Arena; Due West, SC	Conference Carolinas DN	W 3–0 (25–17, 26–24, 25–18)	232	1–0
1/11; 7 p.m.	Central State		Belk Arena; Due West, SC	Conference Carolinas DN	L 2–3 (25-16, 20–25, 23–25, 25-22, 18-20)	132	1-1
1/17; 6 p.m.	@ Tusculum		Pioneer Arena; Greenville, TN	FloVolleyball	L 1–3 (19–25, 16–25, 25–22, 15–25)	213	1–2
1/21; 3 p.m.	Fort Valley State		Belk Arena; Due West, SC	Conference Carolinas DN	W 3–1 (25–22, 25-19, 22–25, 25-22)	42	2-2
1/27; 6 p.m.	@ #9 Grand Canyon		GCU Arena; Phoenix, AZ	ESPN+	L 0–3 (24-26, 20–25, 17–25)	563	2-3
1/28; 4 p.m.	vs. UC San Diego		GCU Arena; Phoenix, AZ	GCU TV	L 0–3 (21-25, 20–25, 15–25)	105	2-4
2/03; 7 p.m.	@ Alderson Broaddus		Rex Pyles Arena; Philippi, WV	Mountain East Network	W 3-0 (25-16, 25–22, 27–25)	25	3-4
2/04; 2 p.m.	@ Charleston (WV)		Russell and Martha Wehrle Innovation Center; Charleston, WV	Mountain East Network	L 0-3 (17-25, 15–25, 19–25)	50	3-5
2/08; 7 p.m.	Belmont Abbey*		Belk Arena; Due West, SC	Conference Carolinas DN	W 3-2 (25-16, 20–25, 20–25, 25-20, 20-18)	72	4-5 (1-0)
2/10; 7 p.m.	@ Lees-McRae*		Williams Gymnasium; Banner Elk, NC	Conference Carolinas DN	L 0-3 (26-28, 23-25, 12-25)	231	4-6 (1-1)
2/11; 7 p.m.	@ King*		Student Center Complex; Bristol, TN	Conference Carolinas DN	L 2-3 (25-27, 19-25, 26-24, 25-22, 8-15)	231	4-7 (1-2)
2/17; 7 p.m.	@ Barton*		Wilson Gymnasium; Wilson, NC	Conference Carolinas DN	W 3-1 (25-21, 25-23, 25-27, 25-22)	150	5-7 (2-2)
2/18; 2 p.m.	@ Mount Olive*		Kornegay Arena; Mount Olive, NC	Conference Carolinas DN	W 3-1 (25-21, 25-22, 22-25, 25-19)	77	6-7 (3-2)
2/21; 7 p.m.	North Greenville*		Belk Arena; Due West, SC	Conference Carolinas DN	W 3-1 (16-25, 25-20, 25-22, 25-21)	231	7-7 (4-2)
2/25; 2 p.m.	@ Belmont Abbey*	W 3-1 (18-25, 25-19, 25-22, 31-29)	Wheeler Center; Belmont, NC	Conference Carolinas DN		103	8-7 (5-2)
2/28; 7 p.m.	Benedict		Belk Arena; Due West, SC	Conference Carolinas DN	W 3-1 (25-14, 15-25, 25-15, 27-25)	132	9-7
3/08; 7 p.m.	@ Kentucky State		Bell Gymnasium; Frankfort, KY	Stellascope	W 3-0 (25-18, 25-19, 25-23)	45	10-7
3/10; 7 p.m.	@ Lewis		Neil Carey Arena; Romeoville, IL	GLVC SN	L 2-3 (20-25, 23-25, 31-29, 25-23, 7-15)	750	10-8
3/14; 7 p.m.	@ Emmanuel*		Shaw Athletic Center; Franklin Springs, GA	Conference Carolinas DN	W 3-0 (26-24, 25-20, 25-21)	75	11-8 (6-2)
3/17; 7 p.m.	Mount Olive*		Belk Arena; Due West, SC	Conference Carolinas DN	L 1-3 (18-25, 14-25, 26-24, 17-25)	121	11-9 (6-3)
3/18; 2 p.m.	Barton*		Belk Arena; Due West, SC	Conference Carolinas DN	W 3-1 (25-16, 25-20, 20-25, 25-18)	54	12-9 (7-3)
3/24; 7 p.m.	King*		Belk Arena; Due West, SC	Conference Carolinas DN	W 3-2 (25-23, 29-31, 25-20, 23-25, 16-14)		13-9 (8-3)
3/25; 2 p.m.	Lees-McRae*		Belk Arena; Due West, SC	Conference Carolinas DN	L 1-3 (25-22, 22-25, 22-25, 26-28)	98	13-10 (8-4)
4/01; 2 p.m.	@ North Greenville*		Hayes Gymnasium; Tigerville, SC	Conference Carolinas DN	L 0-3 (19-25, 23-25, 14-25)	280	13-11 (8-5)
4/04; 7 p.m.	Limestone		Belk Arena; Due West, SC	Conference Carolinas DN	L 1-3 (19-25, 25-19, 23-25, 16-25)	78	13-12
4/13; 7 p.m.	Emmanuel*		Belk Arena; Due West, SC	Conference Carolinas DN	W 3-0 (25-13, 25-19, 25-20)	213	14-12 (9-5)

*-Indicates conference match.
Times listed are Eastern Time Zone.

== Announcers for televised games ==
- Tusculum: Ben Auten
- Central State: Ben Auten
- Tusculum: Brian Stayton
- Fort Valley:
- Grand Canyon:
- UC San Diego:
- Alderson Broaddus:
- Charleston (WV):
- Belmont Abbey:
- Lees-McRae:
- King:
- Barton:
- Mount Olive:
- North Greenville:
- Belmont Abbey:
- Benedict:
- Kentucky State:
- Lewis:
- Emmanuel:
- Mount Olive:
- Barton:
- King:
- Lees-McRae:
- North Greenville:
- Limestone:
- Emmanuel:
