= 2022 Southern Intercollegiate Athletic Conference men's volleyball tournament =

Volleyball Tournament

2022 Southern Intercollegiate Athletic Conference Men's Volleyball Tournament
- Classification: Division I/II
- Teams: 6
- Site: Rock Hill Sport & Event Center; Rock Hill, South Carolina
- Champions: Central State (1st title)
- Winning coach: Ray Lewis (1st title)
- MVP: Yaron Afek (Central State)
- Television: YouTube
- Southern Intercollegiate Athletic Conference Men's Volleyball Tournaments

The 2022 Southern Intercollegiate Athletic Conference men's volleyball tournament, the inaugural men's volleyball SIAC tournament, was a men's volleyball tournament for the Southern Intercollegiate Athletic Conference during the 2022 NCAA Division I & II men's volleyball season. It was held April 19 through April 21, 2022 at Rock Hill Sport & Event Center. The winner was eligible for one of the two Wild Cards in the 2022 NCAA Volleyball Tournament, but they weren't selected. The conference champion won't get an automatic bid until the 2024 season.

Central State went on to win the event, their first ever SIAC title in any sport.

2022 Southern Intercollegiate Athletic Conference men's volleyball standings
	Conf.				Overall
Team	W		L	PCT	W		L	PCT
Central State ‍†‍‡‍	9	–	1	.900	12	–	13	.480
Edward Waters ‍†‍‍	9	–	1	.900	13	–	18	.419
Fort Valley State ‍‍‍	6	–	4	.600	8	–	14	.364
Benedict ‍‍‍	4	–	6	.400	8	–	14	.364
Kentucky State ‍‍‍	2	–	8	.200	3	–	15	.167
Morehouse ‍‍‍	0	–	10	.000	0	–	19	.000
† – Conference champion ‡ – 2022 SIAC Tournament champion y- Invited to the NCAA volleyball tournament Rankings from AVCA

== Seeds ==
All 6 teams participated in the double elimination tournament. Seeds 1 and 2 received a 1st round bye. Seed 3 played Seed 6 and Seed 4 played Seed 5 in the conference tournament opening round. All matches were held at Rock Hill Sport & Event Center in Rock Hill, SC. The conference initially entered into a deal in 2019 for the women's volleyball and basketball tournaments to be held at the venue, with men's volleyball being added for this season.

Seedings and placement are to be determined by win percentage. The SIAC has not posted what the tiebreaker procedures are.

Seed	School	Conference	Tiebreaker
1	Central State	9–1	–
2	Edward Waters	9–1	–
3	Fort Valley State	6–4	–
4	Benedict	4–6	–
5	Kentucky State	2–8	–
6	Morehouse	0–10	–

== Schedule and results ==
Time Network	Matchup	Score	Attendance
First Round – Tuesday, April 19
1 p.m. YouTube	No. 3 Fort Valley State vs. No. 6 Morehouse	3–0 (25–12, 25–11, 25–10)	57
1 p.m. YouTube	No. 4 Benedict vs. No. 5 Kentucky State	3–0 (25–8, 25–22, 25–13)	25
Second Round – Tuesday, April 19
4 p.m. YouTube	No. 1 Central State vs. No. 4 Benedict	3–1 (17–25, 25–22, 25–16, 27–25)	25
4 p.m. YouTube	No. 2 Edward Waters vs. No. 3 Fort Valley State	3–2 (18–25, 21–25, 25–20, 25–23, 15–12)	47
Consolation First Round – Wednesday, April 20
1 p.m. YouTube	No. 6 Morehouse vs. No. 4 Benedict	0–3 (15–25, 12–25, 11–25)	50
1 p.m. YouTube	No. 5 Kentucky State vs. No. 3 Fort Valley State	0–3 (6–25, 9–25, 20–25)	47
Consolation Second Round – Wednesday, April 20
4 p.m. YouTube	No. 4 Benedict vs. No. 3 Fort Valley State	3–2 (20–25, 25–20, 28–26, 22–25, 15–11)	25
Semifinal 1– Wednesday, April 20
4 p.m. YouTube	No. 1 Central State vs. No. 2 Edward Waters	3–2 (25–18, 19–25, 23–25, 25–15, 15–11)	159
Semifinal 2– Thursday, April 21
10 a.m. YouTube	No. 2 Edward Waters vs. No. 4 Benedict	3–0 (25–19, 25–19, 25–19)	51
Championship – Thursday, April 21
1 p.m. YouTube	No. 1 Central State vs. No. 2 Edward Waters	3–2 (18–25, 25–23, 25–19, 14–25, 15–11)	55
4 p.m. YouTube	IF NECESSARY REMATCH	–	–
Game times are Eastern Time. Rankings denote tournament seeding.

== Bracket ==
1st Round
4	Benedict	3
5	Kentucky State	0
3	Fort Valley State	3
6	Morehouse	0
Lower round 1
6	Morehouse	0
4	Benedict	3
5	Kentucky State	0
3	Fort Valley State	3

2nd Round
1	Central State	3
4	Benedict	0
2	Edward Waters	3
3	Fort Valley State	2
Lower round 2
4	Benedict	3
3	Fort Valley State	2

Semifinals
1	Central State	3
2	Edward Waters	2
Lower final
2	Edward Waters	3
4	Benedict	0

Championship
1	Central State	3
2	Edward Waters	2

== All Tournament Team ==
- Ray Lewis, Coach of the Tournament
- Yaron Afek, Central State - Tournament MVP
- Marcus Franck, Central State
- Antonio Barazza, Central State
- Evens Edouard, Edward Waters
- Kenyon Haynes, Edward Waters
- Ras Jesse Delancy, Benedict
- Oshane Farquharson, Fort Valley State
