= Charles Young Buffalo Soldiers National Monument =

- Col. Charles Young House
- U.S. National Register of Historic Places
- U.S. National Historic Landmark
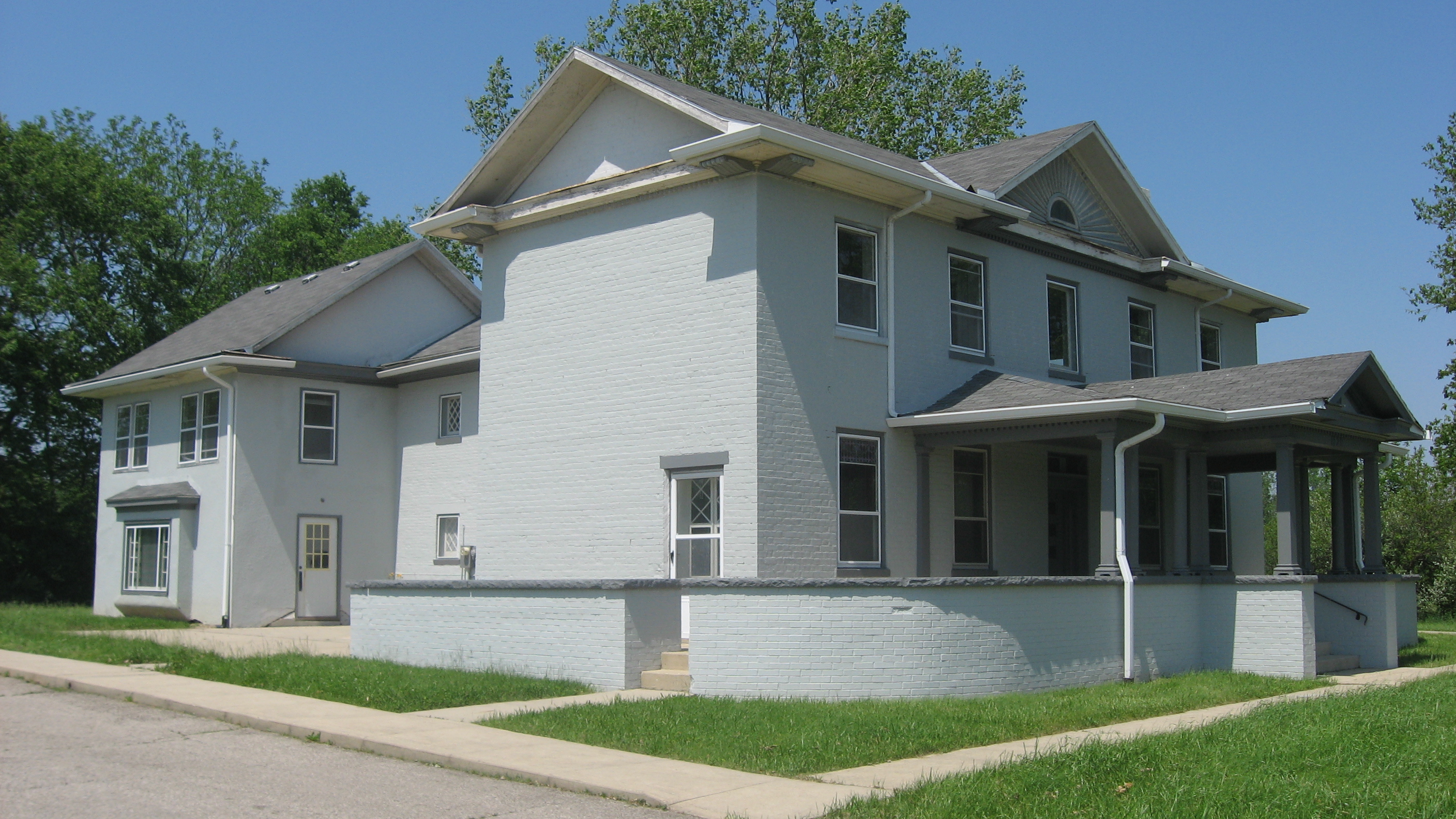
- Front and side of the house

- Location within Ohio Location within the United States
- Interactive map of Col. Charles Young House
- Location: Columbus Pike between Clifton and Stevenson Rds., Wilberforce, Ohio
- Coordinates: 39.707252°N 83.890227°W
- Area: 59.65 acres (24.14 ha)
- Built: 1839
- Visitation: 4,412 (2025)
- Website: Charles Young Buffalo Soldiers National Monument
- NRHP reference No.: 74001506

Significant dates
- Added to NRHP: March 30, 1974
- Designated NHL: May 30, 1974

The Charles Young Buffalo Soldiers National Monument, a National Monument of the United States, commemorates the life of Charles Young (1864–1922), an escaped slave who rose to become a Buffalo Soldier in the United States Army and its first African-American colonel. It is located on United States Route 42 in Wilberforce, Ohio, in a house purchased by Young in 1907 that was designated a National Historic Landmark in 1974. The monument is administered by the National Park Service; the house is open by appointment for tours.

== Description and history ==
The Charles Young House is located in a rural setting southwest of Wilberforce, on the north side of US 42 between Clifton and Stevenson Roads. The house is an eclectically styled 2 1/2-story brick building, with a gabled roof that has deeply overhanging eaves. A T-shaped porch extends across the middle three bays of the five-bay front facade, supported by square posts. A series of ells extend to the rear, giving the building a T shape.

Charles Young was born into slavery in Kentucky in 1864. He was the third African American graduate of West Point, the first black U.S. national park superintendent, the first African American military attaché, and the highest ranking black officer in the United States Army until his death in 1922. He also taught military science at Wilberforce University, during which time he purchased this house, which he called "Youngsholm." The house was built in 1832, and is reported to have served as a way station on the Underground Railroad.

On March 25, 2013, under the Antiquities Act, President Barack Obama designated the house as the Charles Young Buffalo Soldiers National Monument, a unit of the National Park Service. The house museum has exhibits about Young and the Buffalo Soldiers. A 15-month renovation began in October 2021 to restore the home to its state when Young lived there.

== See also ==
- National Afro-American Museum and Cultural Center, also in Wilberforce
- List of national monuments of the United States
