= Charles Young (United States Army officer) =

United States Army officer (1864–1922)

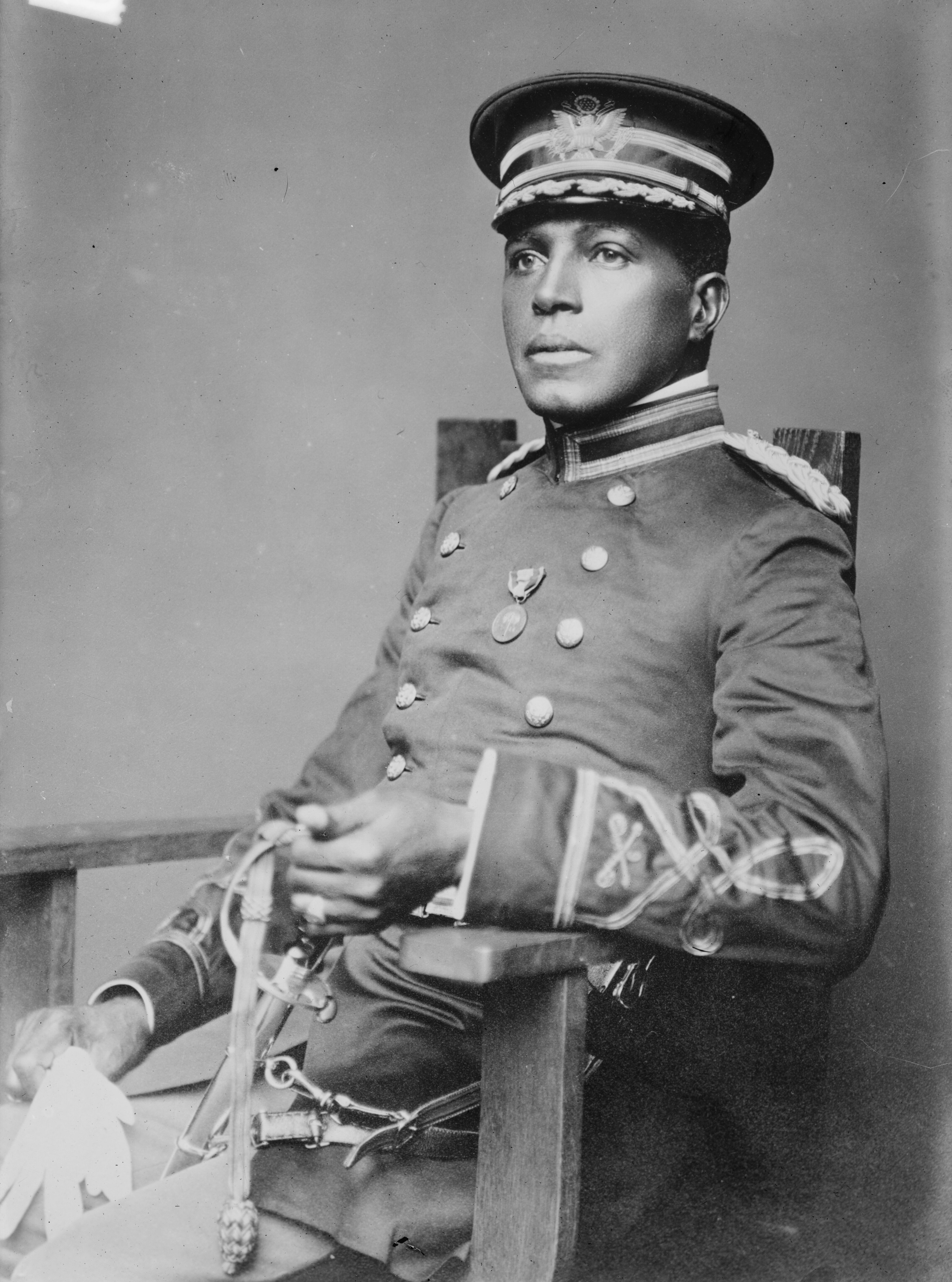
- Young in 1916
- Born: March 12, 1864; Mays Lick, Kentucky, U.S.
- Died: January 8, 1922 (aged 57); Lagos, Colony and Protectorate of Nigeria
- Burial place: Arlington National Cemetery
- Military career
- Allegiance: United States
- Service years: 1889–1922
- Rank: Brigadier general (posthumous)
- Units: 9th Cavalry Regiment; 10th Cavalry Regiment
- Commands: 9th Ohio Volunteer Infantry Regiment; 2nd Squadron, 10th Cavalry Regiment; Fort Huachuca
- Conflicts: Indian Wars; Spanish–American War; Philippine–American War; Pancho Villa Expedition; World War I

Charles Young (March 12, 1864 – January 8, 1922) was an American soldier. He was the third African American graduate of the United States Military Academy, the first Black U.S. national park superintendent, first Black military attaché, first Black man to achieve the rank of colonel in the United States Army, and highest-ranking Black officer in the Regular Army until his death in 1922.

In 2022, in recognition of his exemplary service and the barriers he faced due to racism, he was posthumously promoted to brigadier general, and a promotion ceremony was held in his honor at the U.S. Military Academy at West Point.

== Early life and education ==
Charles Young was born in 1864 into slavery to Gabriel Young and Arminta Bruen in Mays Lick, Kentucky, a small village near Maysville. However, his father escaped from slavery early in 1865, crossing the Ohio River to Ripley, Ohio, and enlisting in the 5th United States Colored Heavy Artillery Regiment near the end of the American Civil War. His service earned Gabriel and his wife their freedom, which was guaranteed by the 13th Amendment. His mother was literate, which suggests she may have worked as a house slave. The Young family settled in Ripley when Gabriel was discharged in 1866. Gabriel Young received a bonus by continuing to serve in the Army after the war, and he had enough money to buy land and build a house.

In the late nineteenth century Ripley, Ohio was a thriving river town of about 2,500 residents. Before the war, Ripley was a major station on the Underground Railroad, led by men like Rev. John Rankin, a Presbyterian minister, and John P. Parker, a foundry owner and businessman who had been born into slavery, but was able to buy his freedom. Parker was literate and self-educated and he believed the way to equality for Blacks was through education. John Parker was the one who had assisted Gabriel Young in enlisting in the Union Army in 1865.

The Youngs lived on Cherry Street in Ripley. Charles attended the colored school and was also home schooled by his mother. He showed a musical inclination early in life, learning to play the piano and violin and as a teenager played at the AME Church for Sunday services.

In the 1870s, the schools in Ripley were semi-integrated; there were separate black and white schools, but there were a few combined high school classes such as upper-level languages that were integrated, as were graduation exercises. J.C. Shumaker was superintendent of the schools and J.T. Whitson was principal of the colored school. Both men recognized Young's potential and encouraged him to complete his education. During his high school years, in addition to the usual courses, Charles learned German and French, graduating with honors in 1881. Of the twenty-one graduates in his class, Young was the only one of African descent. Each of the graduates performed and/or spoke at the ceremony. Charles played a piece on the piano and gave an oration entitled "Let There Be Light".

Following graduation, before entering West Point, Young taught at the colored school in Ripley. Although there were separate schools for colored and white students, the monthly teacher meetings were integrated. At one of these meetings, Young presented a paper entitled, "We Must Educate".

During these formative years, in addition to his teachers, Charles was mentored by John Parker. Parker saw the same potential in Young that his teachers did and, consequently, did all he could to encourage Charles to excel; to move beyond his world in Ripley and to do his part to improve the status of his race in America.

In 1883, an ad in the Ripley Bee, the local newspaper, announced that an entrance exam for West Point would be given in Hillsboro, Ohio. Young took the exam and, of the twenty-six men who took it, he placed second. Each congressional district could nominate one cadet and Representative Alphonso Hart, of Ohio's 12th district, appointed William Stamats, but Stamats resigned the position. Hart then nominated Young in April 1884 and Charles left for West Point in June of that year.

Biographer Brian G. Shellum wrote, "Young was fortunate that his parents eventually settled in Ripley, Ohio. Ripley was a one-of-a-kind community, and the Youngs could have found no better place in Ohio to start their life."

== West Point ==
When Young reported to the United States Military Academy at West Point as a cadet in 1884, there was already one other Black cadet, John Hanks Alexander, who had entered in 1883 (graduated in 1887). Young and Alexander shared a room for three years at West Point. Young had to repeat his first year when he failed mathematics, delaying his graduation until 1889. Although regularly discriminated against, Young made several lifelong friends among his later classmates, but none among his initial entering class. He later failed an engineering class, but he passed it the second time when he was tutored during the summer by George Washington Goethals, the Army engineer who later directed construction of the Panama Canal and who as an assistant professor took an interest in Young.

As one of the first African Americans to attend and graduate from West Point, Charles Young faced challenges far beyond the traditional hazing experienced by his White peers. He experienced extreme racial discrimination from classmates, faculty, and upperclassmen. Hazing was not an unusual practice at the military academies. Charles Young, however, was subjected to a disproportionate amount of abuse because of his color.

Upon arrival to West Point, Young was welcomed in as "The Load of Coal". Once, in the mess hall, a White cadet proclaimed that he would not take food from a platter that Young had already taken from. Young passed the White cadet the plate first, allowing him to take from it, then he himself took from the plate. Upperclassmen targeted and demerited Young 140 times, which was considered unusually high. Whereas Young's peers were referred to solely by their last names, Young was called "Mr. Young" as a kind of feigned deference. One of Young's greatest struggles at West Point was loneliness. A White classmate of Young's, Major General Charles D. Rhodes, later reported that it was a practice of Young to converse with some of the servants at West Point in German to maintain some human interaction.

Toward the end of his five-year stay at West Point, the merciless discrimination and taunts decreased. Due to his perseverance, some of Young's classmates began to see past the color of his skin. Despite this and by his own admission, Young's time at West Point was fraught with difficulty.

== Career ==
Young graduated in 1889 (Cullum number 3330) with his commission as a second lieutenant, the third Black man to do so at the time (after Henry Ossian Flipper and John Hanks Alexander, and the last one until Benjamin O. Davis Jr. in 1936). He was first assigned to the Tenth U.S. Cavalry Regiment. Through a reassignment, he served first with the Ninth U.S. Cavalry Regiment, in Nebraska. His subsequent service of 28 years was chiefly with Black troops—the Ninth U.S. Cavalry and the Tenth U.S. Cavalry, Black troops nicknamed the "Buffalo Soldiers" since the Indian Wars. The armed services were racially segregated until 1948, when President Harry S. Truman issued executive order.

== Marriage and family ==
Young married Ada Mills on February 18, 1904, in Oakland, California. They had two children: Charles Noel, born in 1906 in Ohio, and Marie Aurelia, born in 1909 when Young and his family were stationed in the Philippines.

== Military service ==
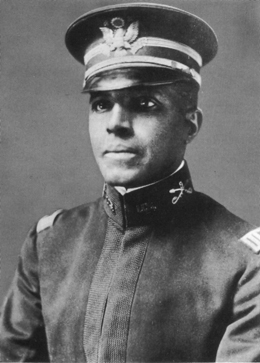
Captain Charles Young in 1903

Young began his service with the Ninth Cavalry, from 1889 to 1890 he served at Fort Robinson, Nebraska, and from 1890 to 1894 at Fort Duchesne, Utah.

In 1894, he was assigned to Wilberforce University in Ohio, an historically black college (HBCU), to lead the new military sciences department, established under a special federal grant. A professor for four years, he was one of several outstanding men on staff, including W. E. B. Du Bois, who became his close friend.

When the Spanish–American War broke out, Young was promoted to the temporary rank of major of volunteers on May 14, 1898. He commanded the 9th Ohio Infantry Regiment which was, in the terminology of the day, a "colored" (i.e. African-American) unit. Despite its name, the 9th Ohio was only battalion sized with four companies. The war ended before Young and his men could be sent overseas. Young's command of this unit is significant because it was probably the first time in history an African American commanded a sizable unit of the United States Army and one of the very few instances prior to the late 20th century. He was mustered out of the volunteers on January 28, 1899, and reverted to his regular army rank of first lieutenant. He was promoted to captain in the 9th Cavalry Regiment on February 2, 1901.

=== National Park assignments ===
In 1903, Young served as captain of a black company at the Presidio of San Francisco. He was then appointed acting superintendent of Sequoia and General Grant national parks, becoming the first Black superintendent of a national park. (At that time the military supervised all national parks.) Because of limited funding, however, the Army assigned its soldiers for short-term assignments during the summers, which made it difficult for the officers to accomplish longer-term goals. Young supervised payroll accounts and directed the activities of rangers.

Young's greatest impact on the park was managing road construction, which allow more visitors to enjoy it. Young's men accomplished more that summer than had been done under the three officers assigned to the park during the previous three summers. Captain Young's troops completed a road to the Giant Forest, home of the world's largest trees, and a road to the base of Moro Rock. By mid-August, the wagons of visitors could enter the mountaintop forest for the first time.

With the end of the brief summer construction season, Young was transferred on November 2, 1903, and reassigned as a troop commander of the Tenth Cavalry at the Presidio. In his final report on Sequoia Park to the Secretary of the Interior, he recommended that the government acquire privately held lands there. This recommendation was noted in legislation when it was introduced in the United States House of Representatives.

=== Other military assignments ===
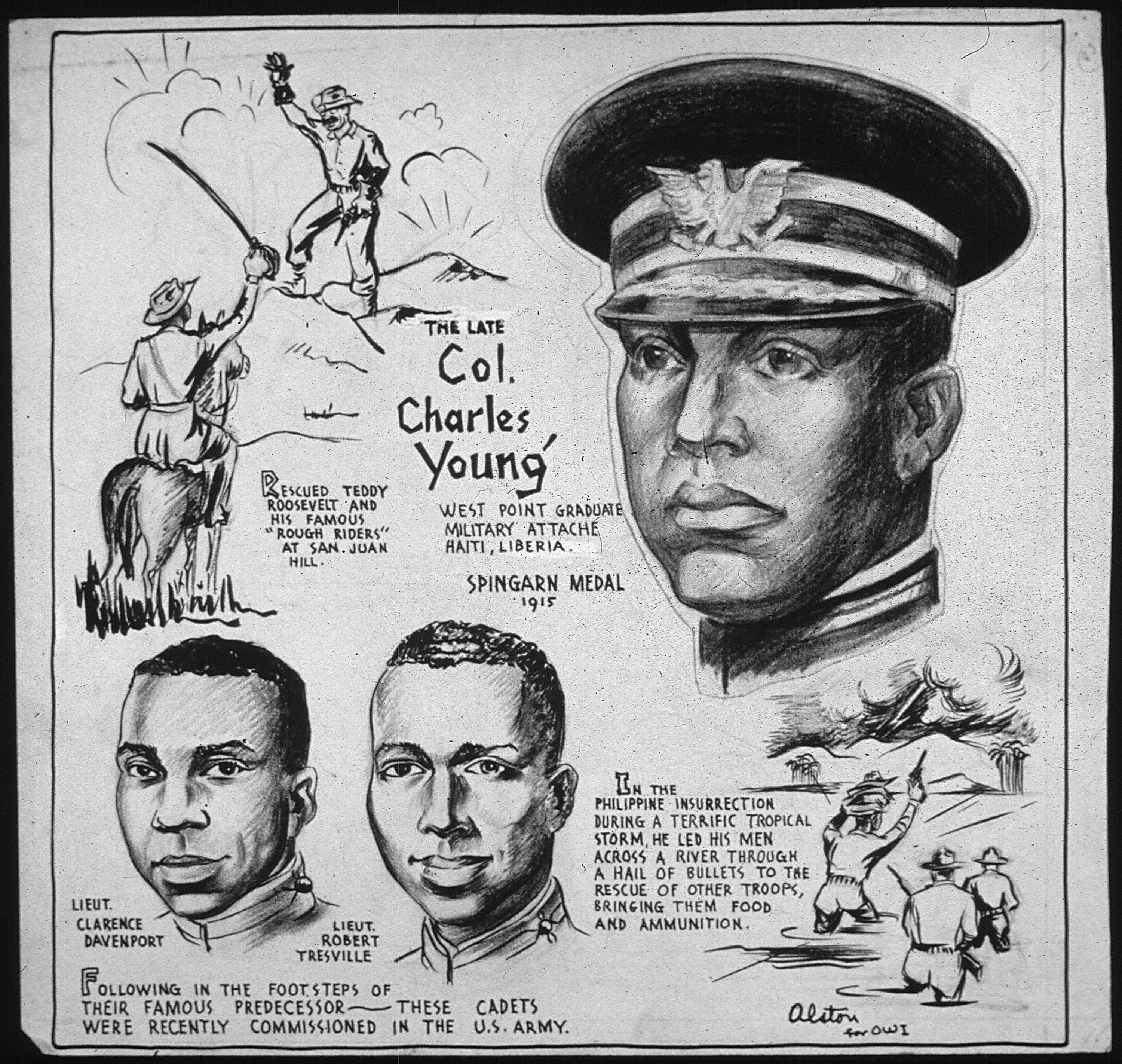
"The Late Col. Charles Young," cartoon by Charles Alston, 1943

With the Army's founding of the Military Intelligence Department, in 1904 it assigned Young as one of the first military attachés, serving in Port-au-Prince, Haiti. He was to collect intelligence on different groups in Haiti, to help identify forces that might destabilize the government. He served there for three years.

In 1908, Young was sent to the Philippines to join his Ninth Regiment and command a squadron of two troops. It was his second tour there. After his return to the United States, he served for two years at Fort D. A. Russell, Wyoming.

In 1912, Young was assigned as military attaché to Liberia, the first African American to hold that post. On August 28 of that year, he was promoted to major, becoming the first African American to have been promoted to that rank or its equivalent in the regular U. S. armed services. For three years, he served as an expert adviser to the Liberian government and also took a direct role in supervising construction of the country's infrastructure. For his achievements, in 1916 the National Association for the Advancement of Colored People (NAACP) awarded Young the Spingarn Medal, given annually to the African American demonstrating the highest achievement and contributions.

In 1912, Young published The Military Morale of Nations and Races, a study of the cultural sources of military power. He argued against the prevailing theories of the fixity of racial character, using history and social science to demonstrate that even supposedly servile or un-military races (such as Negroes and Jews) displayed martial virtues when fighting for democratic societies. Thus the key to raising an effective mass army from among a polyglot American people was to link patriotic service with fulfillment of the democratic promise of equal rights and fair play for all. Young's book was dedicated to Theodore Roosevelt, and invoked the principles of Roosevelt's "New Nationalism".

During the 1916 Punitive Expedition by the United States into Mexico, then-Major Young commanded the 2nd Squadron of the 10th United States Cavalry. While leading a cavalry pistol charge against Pancho Villa's forces at Agua Caliente (April 1, 1916), he routed the opposing forces without losing a single man.

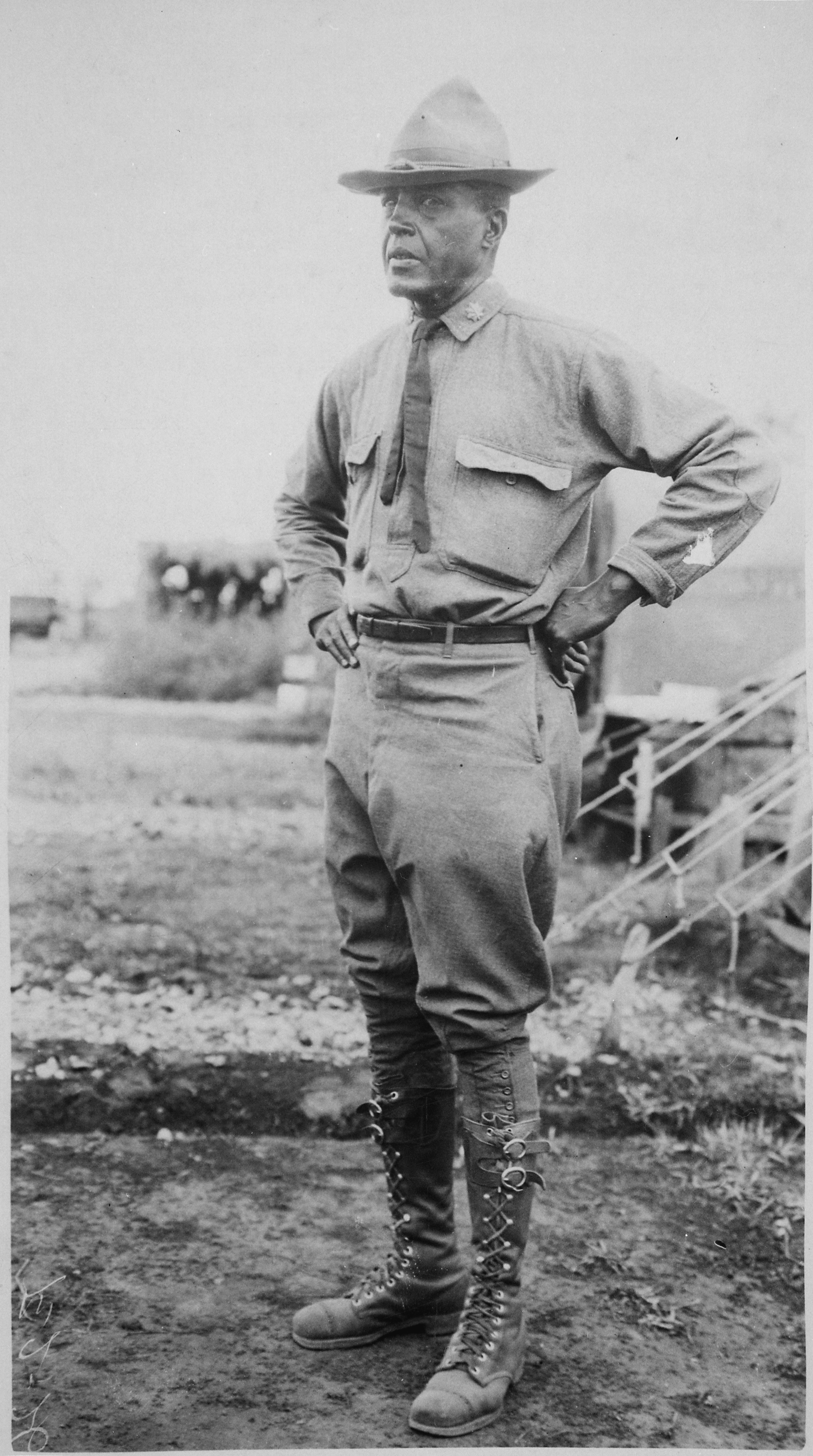
Young in 1916, shortly before his promotion to lieutenant colonel.

Because of his exceptional leadership of the 10th Cavalry in the Mexican theater of war, Young was promoted to lieutenant colonel on July 1, 1916, the first African American to attain the rank or its equivalent since Alexander Thomas Augusta in 1865 (whose rank was brevet). He was assigned as commander of Fort Huachuca, the base in Arizona of the Tenth Cavalry, nicknamed the "Buffalo Soldiers", until mid 1917. He was the first African American to achieve the rank of colonel in the US Army.

=== Forced retirement ===
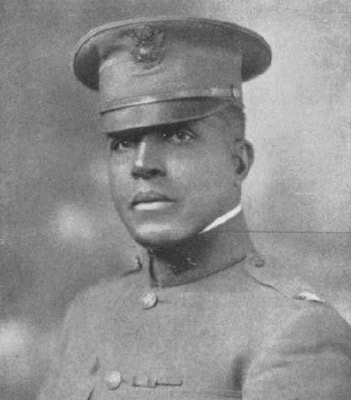
Young c. 1919

With the United States about to enter World War I, Young stood a good chance of being promoted to brigadier general. However, there was widespread resistance among White officers, particularly those from the segregated South, who did not want to be outranked by an African American. A Southern White lieutenant, Albert Dockery who served under Young complained to the War Department that he did not wish to serve under a Black man, and Secretary of War Newton D. Baker replied that he should "either do his duty or resign." John Sharp Williams, senator from Mississippi, complained on the lieutenant's behalf to President Woodrow Wilson. The President overruled Baker's decision and had the lieutenant transferred.

Baker considered sending Young to Fort Des Moines, an officer training camp for African Americans. However, Baker realized that if Young were allowed to fight in Europe with Black troops under his command, he would be eligible for promotion to brigadier general, and it would be impossible not to have White officers serving under him. The War Department instead removed Young from active duty, claiming it was due to his high blood pressure. Young was placed temporarily on the inactive list (with the rank of colonel on June 22, 1917.

In May 1917 Young appealed to Theodore Roosevelt for support of his application for reinstatement. Roosevelt was then in the midst of his campaign to form a "volunteer division" for early service in France in World War I. Roosevelt appears to have planned to recruit at least one and perhaps two Black regiments for the division, something he had not told President Wilson or Secretary of War Baker. He immediately wrote to Young offering him command of one of the prospective regiments, saying "there is not another man [besides yourself] who would be better fitted to command such a regiment." Roosevelt also promised Young carte blanche in appointing staff and line officers for the unit. However, Wilson refused Roosevelt permission to organize his volunteer division.

Young returned to Wilberforce University, where he was a professor of military science through most of 1918. On November 6, 1918, after he had traveled by horseback from Wilberforce, Ohio, to Washington, D.C., to prove his physical fitness, he was reinstated on active duty as a colonel. Baker did not rescind his order that Young be forcibly retired. In 1919, Young was reassigned as military attaché to Liberia.

== Death ==
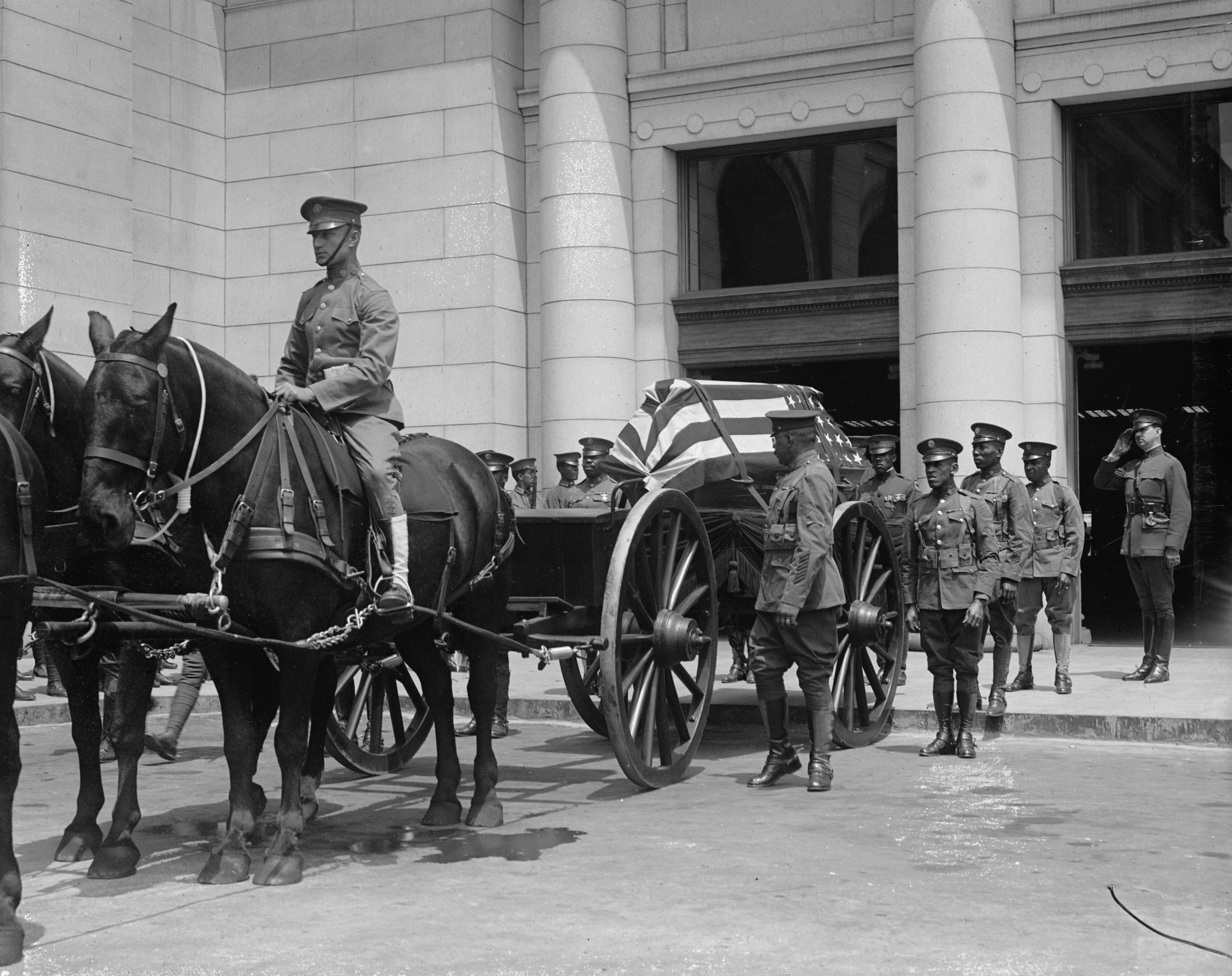
Young's funeral procession, 1923

While Young was on a reconnaissance mission in Colonial Nigeria in late 1921, he suddenly became debilitatingly ill. Young died of a kidney infection at the British hospital in Lagos on January 8, 1922. Under British colonial law, his body was required to be buried in Lagos where it remained for a year. During that year, Young's wife and many notable African Americans at the time made requests for Young's body be repatriated from Nigeria to receive "a proper military burial". More than a year after his death, Young's body was finally exhumed and brought back to American soil. When his corpse arrived at New York, it received a hero's welcome. There were large crowds of people there, all to pay honor to Young's long and accomplished military career. He was given a full military funeral and was buried at Arlington National Cemetery in Section 3 across the Potomac River from Washington, D.C. He was the fourth soldier to receive a funeral in Arlington Memorial Amphitheater. He is buried with a large tombstone that states his name, military rank, and year of birth and death; its other side simply says "Young". He had become a public and respected figure because of his unique achievements in the Army, and his obituary was carried in The New York Times.

== Honors and legacy ==
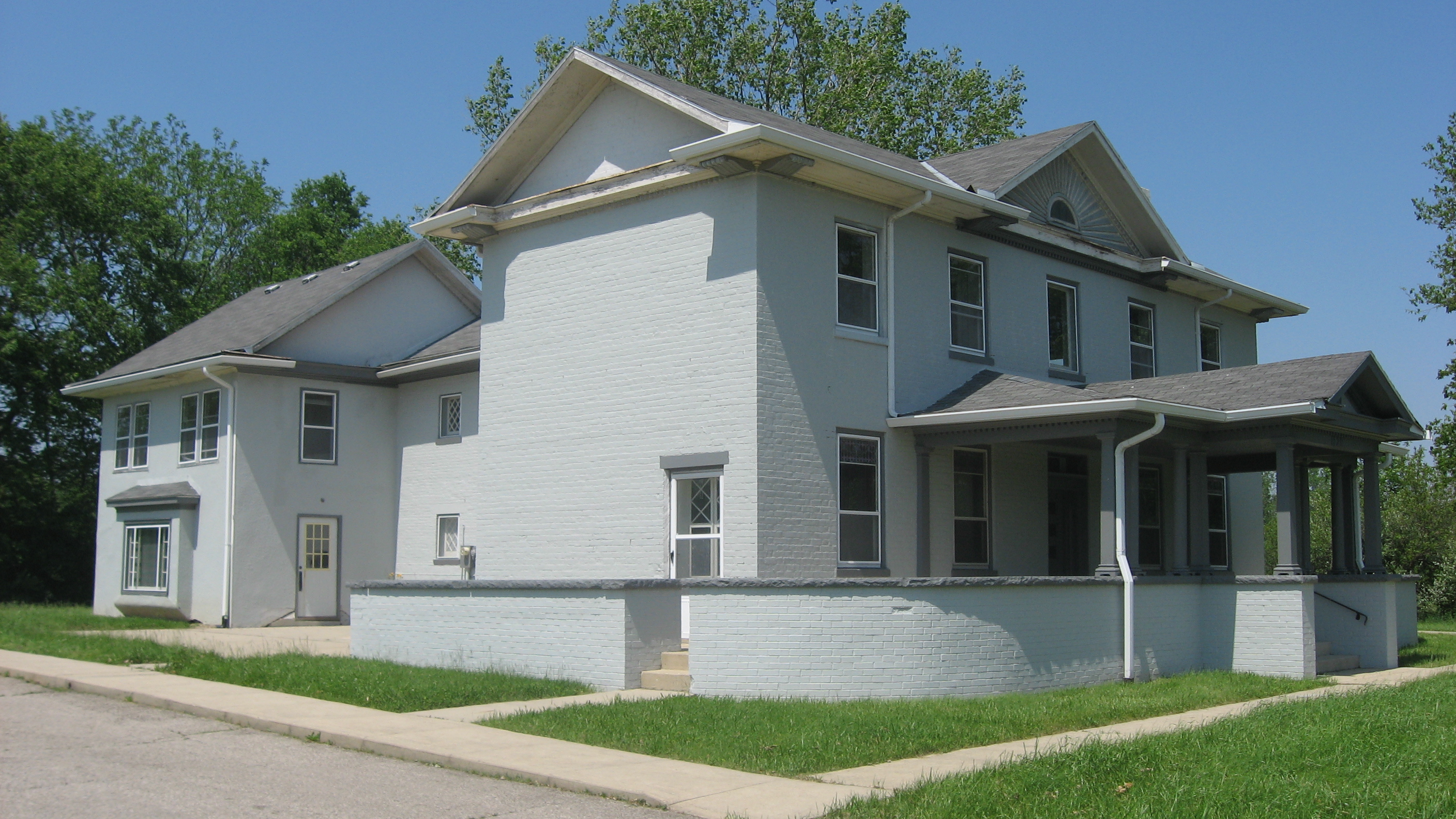
Young's house near Wilberforce, Ohio

=== Honors ===
Charles Young received honors through his life. One he was presented with was a citation in appreciation of his performance as Acting Superintendent of Sequoia National Park by The Visalia, California, Board of Trade. Later on in 1912, he was elected as an honorary member of the Omega Psi Phi fraternity. He was the second honorary member to be elected to the fraternity. Finally, before his death in 1922, The NAACP awarded him the Spingarn Medal for his achievements in Liberia and the US Army in 1916. In February 2020, Governor Andy Beshear of Kentucky posthumously promoted Young to honorary brigadier general in Kentucky; accounts contained no reference to the Kentucky National Guard. Beshear's request for federal recognition of Young's promotion was approved by Under Secretary of Defense for Personnel and Readiness Gil Cisneros on November 1, 2021, with the recognition made effective on February 1, 2022. The promotion ceremony was held on April 29, 2022.

=== Legacy ===
Since his death, there have been multiple efforts to maintain Young's legacy in the United States. This started in 1922, immediately following his death when his obituary appeared in The New York Times, demonstrating his national reputation and also his funeral being one of few held at the Memorial Amphitheater at Arlington National Cemetery, where he was buried in Section 3. During the 1925–1926 school year, the Portland Colored School in Louisville, Kentucky was renamed the Charles Young School. This school, one of the earlier schools in the US serving African Americans, was open between 1873 and 1956. And at its close, the building was demolished and made into a park bearing Young's name. In 2016 the park was rededicated Col. Charles D. Young Park. Seven years after his death, another school was named in his honor: Charles E. Young Elementary School was built along Benning Road in Washington, D.C. It was the first elementary school in Northeast D.C., and oriented to the city's Black neighborhoods. However, it was closed in 2008. The building now houses Two Rivers Public Charter School.

From 1941 to 1943, the Colonel Charles Young Soldiers Club was a recreation center for black soldiers in Trenton, New Jersey. After these accomplishments, it was not until 1974 that the house where Young lived when teaching at Wilberforce University was designated a National Historic Landmark, in recognition of his historic importance. In 2001, Senator Mike DeWine introduced Senate Resolution 97 that “honors the bravery and dedication of the Buffalo Soldiers throughout United States and world history; honors one of the Buffalo Soldiers' most distinguished heroes, Colonel Charles Young, for his lifetime achievements; and recognizes the continuing legacy of the Buffalo Soldiers throughout the world.” In 2013, President Barack Obama used the Antiquities Act to designate Young's house as the 401st unit of the National Park System, the Charles Young Buffalo Soldiers National Monument. In 2018, California passed legislation to name California State Route 198 as Colonel Charles Young Memorial Highway. The State Route's east end is in Sequoia National Park where Young served as superintendent. In 2023, Kentucky designated the area from the Camp Nelson National Monument in Jessamine County to the Ohio border at Mays Lick, as the "Brigadier General Charles Young Memorial Historical Corridor". In 2024, Ohio also designated some of its roadways as the "Brigadier General Charles Young Memorial Historical Corridor": U.S. Route 42 at Campus Drive (on the Wilberforce University campus), past the Charles Young Buffalo Soldiers National Monument, southwest to US 68, south to US 62, through Young's hometown of Ripley, to the Simon Kenton Memorial Bridge which crosses to Kentucky, for a distance of approximately 85 miles (137 km).

=== Literary legacy ===
Along with the legacy from acknowledgements and awards, Young has also taken on a presence in African American art and literature. One of the most notable instances was a 1925 poem by Countée Cullen "In Memory of Colonel Charles Young." The poem accurately predicts the legacy Colonel Charles Young would have for years to come. The poem uses imagery, including Charles Young's resting place in the cemetery where "above your grave the tom-toms throb/ and the hills are weird with light." After Cullen describes a dark world that Young is emerged in, he ends with a hopeful message: "From your rich dust and slaughtered will/ A tree with tongues will grow." Cullen is implying that he believed Young was the start of a movement; as of 2014, African Americans make up more than twenty percent of active-duty Army members.

W. E. B. Du Bois, who spoke at Young's eulogy, claimed that "the life of Charles Young was a triumph of tragedy." Young is also represented in painting and other art. Notably, a painting by J. W. Shannon titled "Portrait of Cadet Charles Young", in which the background gives Young a glowing bright background to make him look saintly. The painting currently belongs to the National Afro-American Museum and Cultural Center, located in Wilberforce, Ohio.

=== Popular culture depictions ===
In the 2020 alternate history Shadows of Annihilation (ISBN 978-0399586279) by S. M. Stirling, Young is depicted as a major general commanding the 32nd Infantry Division, a colored unit in the United States Protectorate of México. Young is also featured in The Great Abraham Lincoln Pocket Watch Conspiracy, where he serves as second-in-command to Major Archibald Butt during a secret mission into the Belgian Congo.

== Military awards ==
Brigadier General Young was awarded the following service medals:

1st row	Indian Campaign Medal		Spanish Campaign Medal
2nd row	Philippine Campaign Medal	Mexican Service Medal	World War I Victory Medal

== Dates of rank ==
Insignia	Rank	Component	Date
No insignia	Cadet	United States Military Academy	June 15, 1884
	Second lieutenant	10th Cavalry, Regular Army	August 31, 1889
	Second lieutenant	25th Infantry, Regular Army (transferred)	October 4, 1889 (permanent rank from that date)
	Second lieutenant	9th Cavalry, Regular Army (transferred)	October 31, 1889
	First lieutenant	7th Cavalry, Regular Army	December 22, 1896
	First lieutenant	9th Cavalry, Regular Army	October 1, 1897 (transferred)
	Major	9th Ohio Colored Infantry, Volunteers	May 14, 1898 (honorably mustered out January 28, 1899)
	Captain	9th Cavalry, Regular Army (unassigned from April 23, 1912)	February 2, 1901
	Major	9th Cavalry, Regular Army (unassigned March 1, 1914 – October 18, 1915, assigned to 10th Cavalry October 19, 1915)	28 August 1912
	Lieutenant colonel	10th Cavalry, Regular Army	July 1, 1916
	Colonel	10th Cavalry, Regular Army (retired)	June 22, 1917
	Colonel	Regular Army (reinstated to active duty)	November 6, 1918
	Brigadier general	Kentucky National Guard (honorary, posthumous)	February 11, 2020
	Brigadier general	Regular Army (honorary, posthumous)	February 1, 2022

== See also ==
- Military history of African Americans
