= National Afro-American Museum and Cultural Center =

Museum of African American history and culture in Wilberforce, Ohio

Coordinates: 39.713063°N 83.87692°W

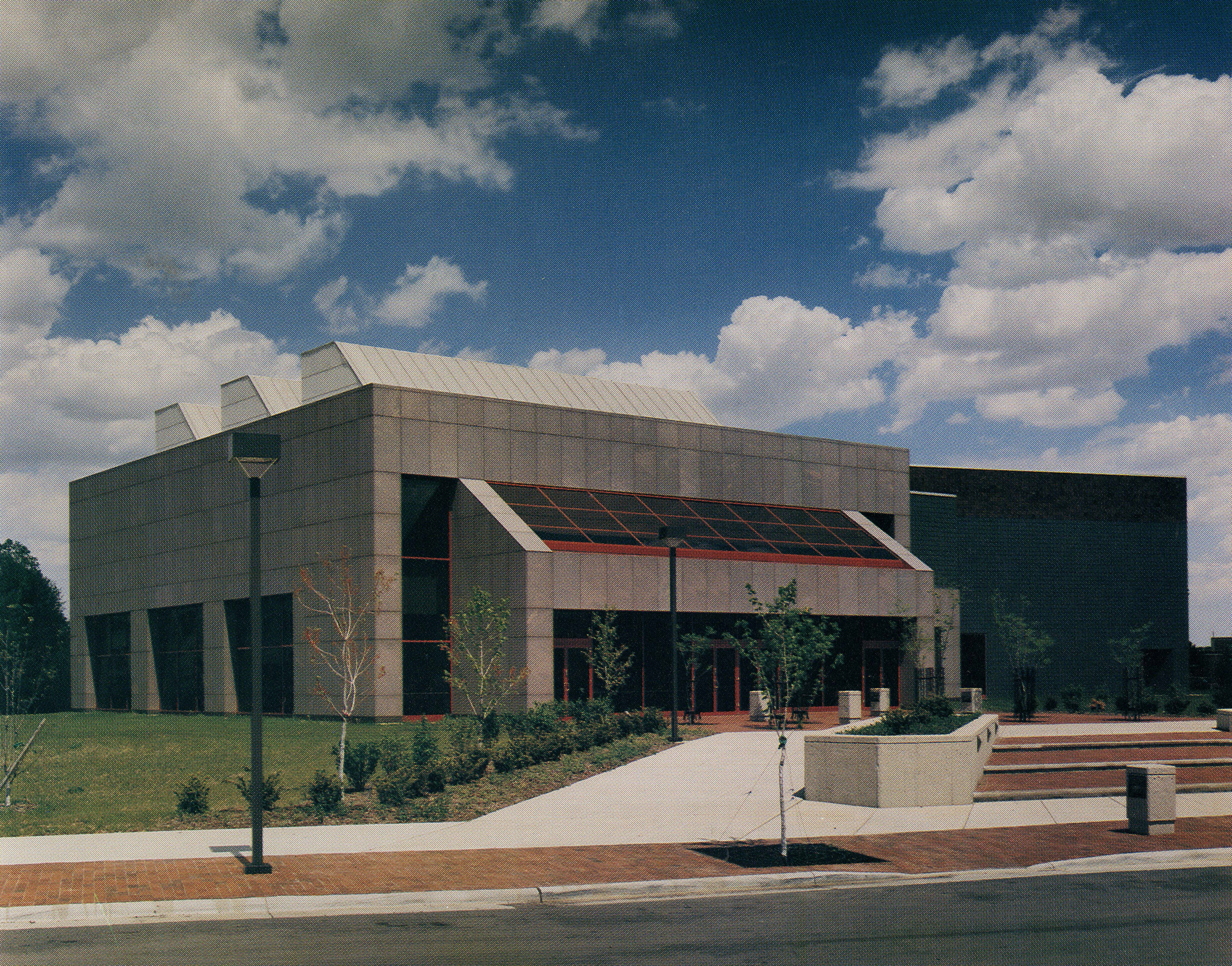
- Established: 1987
- Location: 1350 Brush Row Road, Wilberforce, Ohio, 45384
- Type: Public
- Director: Charles Wash Jr.
- Website: Official website

The National Afro-American Museum and Cultural Center is a museum located in Wilberforce, Ohio, whose mission is to chronicle through its collections and programs the rich and varied experiences of African Americans from their African origins to the present. It is one of many museums operated by the Ohio History Connection.

The museum is located at 1350 Brush Row Road, next to Central State University.

== Founding ==
The concept of a national museum dedicated to African American history and culture can be traced back to the second decade of the 20th century. In 1915, African American veterans of the Union Army met in Washington, D.C., for a reunion and parade. Frustrated with the racial discrimination they still faced, the veterans formed a committee to build a memorial to various African American achievements. Their efforts paid off in 1929, when President Herbert Hoover appointed Mary Church Terrell, Mary McLeod Bethune, and 10 others to a commission charged with building a "National Memorial Building" showcasing African American achievements in the arts and sciences. But Congress did not back the project, and private fundraising also failed. Although proposals for an African American history and culture museum would be floated in Congress for the next 40 years, none gained more than minimal support. It would ultimately take until 2016 for these efforts to be successful with the opening of the Smithsonian Institution's National Museum of African American History and Culture.

Proposals began circulating again in Congress in the early 1970s. At the same time, state officials in Ohio were also attempting to establish an African History museum. Wilberforce had been a major stop on the Underground Railroad (which helped enslaved black people find safe passage through northern states and into Canada), and the former site of Wilberforce University. In 1972, the state passed legislation agreeing to build a museum in Wilberforce. In 1981, Congress approved the creation of a National Afro-American Museum in Wilberforce.

The museum, built and funded with private money, opened in 1987.

== About the museum ==
The museum is a Modernist structure of glass and steel, with about 10,000 square feet (930 m^{2}) of exhibits. Dr. John Fleming led the museum from 1988 to 1998. Mr. Vernon S. Courtney led the museum from 1999 to 2007. Ms. Edna Diggs, a curator at the National Afro-American Museum and Cultural Center, was appointed Interim Director of the museum. She died unexpectedly on June 6, 2011. Dr. Floyd Thomas was named acting director of the museum, until museum archivist, Dr. Charles Wash, was named the director in late 2011.

The museum is considered a specialized museum, because it focuses only on a single aspect of African American history. The museum houses the papers of Ira Tucker, a singer with the important gospel music group the Dixie Hummingbirds. The museum screens a film, Music As Metaphor, which showcases some of the most popular African American musicians and singers of the era and looks at how their music echoed the themes of the American Civil Rights Movement.

In February 1992, the Association of African American Museums began renting space from the museum.

The museum has hosted several important exhibits. In 1998, the museum held a first-of-its-kind exhibition of African American dolls. (The museum has the third-largest collection of African American dolls in the United States.) Barack Obama's election as President of the United States led to a major exhibit in late 2009 at the museum, in which 95 quilts inspired by Obama's election were displayed. In November 2011, the museum received a major donation of papers, letters, photographs, and memorabilia from the estate of Colonel Charles Young. Young was the third African American graduate of West Point, the first black U.S. national park superintendent, first black military attaché, first black to achieve the rank of colonel, and highest-ranking black officer in the United States Army until his death in 1922. In October 2016, the museum opened Kojo: Eyewitness to History, a retrospective of the work of Columbus photographer Kojo Kamau, known as Kojo, who had photographed notable African Americans from Muhammad Ali to President Barack Obama for over 50 years. In May 2017, the museum opened Freed Will: The Randolph Freedpeople From Slavery to Settlement. This exhibit featured photographs and letters of nearly 400 newly emancipated people who journeyed from Charlotte County, Virginia, to Ohio's Miami Valley.

On January 5, 2011, the museum closed abruptly after an extensive mold and humidity problem was discovered. The museum had suffered from roof leaks for some time, and mold was found to have widely infested the building's HVAC system. Museum director Dr. Charles Wash said that the museum would be closed for at least three months while a $433,000 cleanup began. The museum reopened January 27, 2013 following renovations, mechanical system upgrades, and artifact conservation.

== See also ==
- Charles Young Buffalo Soldiers National Monument, in Wilberforce
- List of museums focused on African Americans

== Bibliography ==
- Ames, Kenneth L.; Franco, Barbara; and Frye, L. Thomas. Ideas and Images: Developing Interpretive History Exhibits. Walnut Creek, Calif.: AltaMira Press, 1999.
- Higginbotham, Evelyn Brooks; Litwack, Leon F.; and Hine, Darlene Clark. The Harvard Guide to African-American History. Cambridge, Mass.: Harvard University Press, 2001.
- Horton, James Oliver and Crew, Spencer R. "Afro-Americans and Museums: Toward a Policy of Inclusion." In History Museums in the United States: A Critical Assessment. Warren Leon and Roy Rosenzweig, eds. Urbana, Ill.: University of Illinois Press, 1989.
- Mjagkij, Nina. Organizing Black America: An Encyclopedia of African American Associations. Florence, Ky.: Taylor & Francis, 2001.
- Ruffins, Fath Davis. "Culture Wars Won and Lost, Part II: Ethnic Museums on the Mall." Radical History Review. June 1998.
- Stein, Shifra; Bellman, Sacha Devroomen; and Winternitz, Felix. Day Trips From Cincinnati: Gateway Ideas for the Local Traveler. Guilford, Conn.: Globe Pequot Press, 2007.
- Zimmermann, George and Zimmermann, Carol. Ohio: Off the Beaten Path. Guilford, Conn.: GPP Travel, 2010.
