= HRC Arena =

Multi-purpose arena in Columbia, South Carolina

Coordinates: 34.017531°N 81.009407°W

The Mays Arena is a 3,500-seat multi-purpose arena in Columbia, South Carolina. It is the home of the Benedict College Tigers basketball teams and was home to the Columbia Rottweilers of the American Basketball Association.

The arena was also known as Mays Arena after De. Benjamin E. Mays.
