= Wilberforce, Ohio =

- Census-designated place
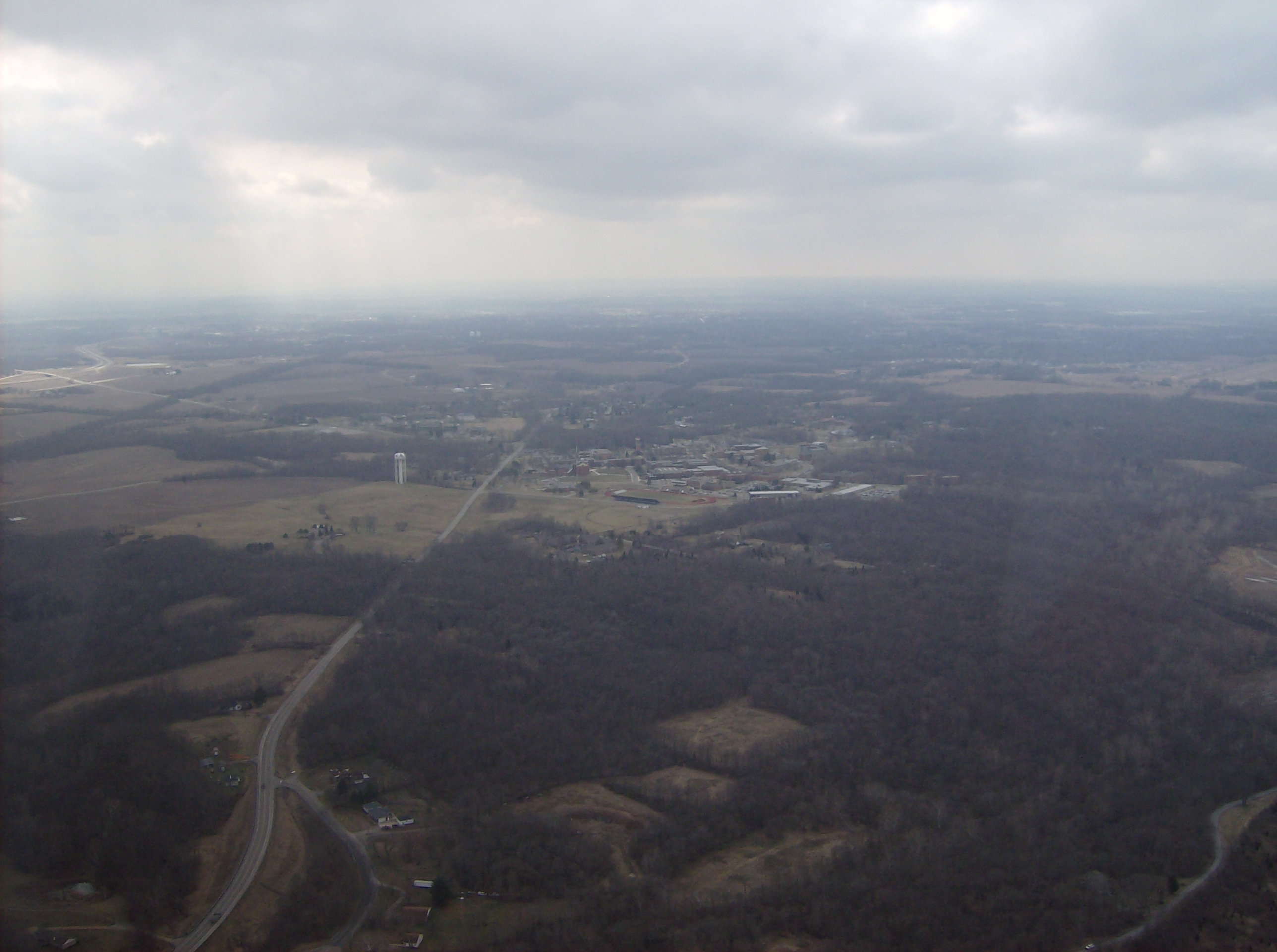
- Approaching Wilberforce from the northeast

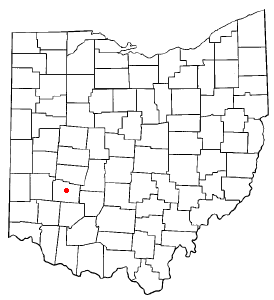
- Location of Wilberforce, Ohio
- Coordinates: 39°42′58″N 83°52′33″W
- Country: United States
- State: Ohio
- County: Greene
- Township: Xenia

Area
  - Total: 3.10 sq mi (8.04 km^{2})
  - Land: 3.08 sq mi (7.98 km^{2})
  - Water: 0.023 sq mi (0.06 km^{2})
- Elevation: 1,024 ft (312 m)

Population (2020)
  - Total: 2,410
  - Density: 782.3/sq mi (302.03/km^{2})
- Time zone: UTC-5 (Eastern (EST))
  - Summer (DST): UTC-4 (EDT)
- ZIP code: 45384
- Area codes: 937, 326
- FIPS code: 39-85092
- GNIS feature ID: 2393859

Wilberforce is a census-designated place (CDP) in Greene County, Ohio, United States. The population was 2,410 at the 2020 census. It is home to two historically black universities, Wilberforce University and Central State University.

== History ==
After Wilberforce University was established in 1856, the community was also named for the English statesman William Wilberforce, who worked for the abolition of slavery and achieved the end of the slave trade in the United Kingdom and its empire. The small community served as an important stop for refugee slaves on the Underground Railroad before the American Civil War, as it had seven stations.

The Ohio Historical Society operates the National Afro-American Museum and Cultural Center, which provides exhibits and learning opportunities for the regional community. The Association of African American Museums, also located in Wilberforce and supported by the private university, works to build professional capacity among smaller museums.

On April 3, 1974, during the 1974 Super Outbreak, a destructive F5 tornado moved through the area after exiting the nearby city of Xenia, where it destroyed many homes and businesses. The tornado severely damaged several structures in Wilberforce, including multiple campus and residential buildings of Wilberforce University. Central State University also sustained significant damage, and a water tower was toppled. As a result of the tornado, 32 people were killed, and about 1,150 people were injured.

== Geography ==
Wilberforce is located in central Greene County and is bordered to the southwest by the city of Xenia, the county seat. Wilberforce is part of the Dayton Metropolitan Statistical Area.

U.S. Route 42 passes through the community, leading southwest 3.5 miles (5.6 km) to the center of Xenia and northeast 4.5 miles (7.2 km) to Cedarville. Downtown Dayton is 19 miles (31 km) to the west of Wilberforce.

According to the United States Census Bureau, the CDP has a total area of 3.1 square miles (8.0 km^{2}), of which 0.02 square miles (0.06 km^{2}), or 0.78%, is water.

== Demographics ==
Historical population
Census	Pop.	Note	%±
2000	1,579		—
2010	2,271		43.8%
2020	2,410		6.1%
U.S. Decennial Census

=== 2020 census ===
Wilberforce CDP, Ohio – Racial and ethnic composition Note: the US Census treats Hispanic/Latino as an ethnic category. This table excludes Latinos from the racial categories and assigns them to a separate category. Hispanics/Latinos may be of any race.
Race / Ethnicity (NH = Non-Hispanic)	Pop 2000	Pop 2010	Pop 2020	% 2000	% 2010	% 2020
White alone (NH)	175	289	253	11.08%	12.73%	10.50%
Black or African American alone (NH)	1,323	1,842	2,014	83.79%	81.11%	83.57%
Native American or Alaska Native alone (NH)	5	5	11	0.32%	0.22%	0.46%
Asian alone (NH)	2	3	6	0.13%	0.13%	0.25%
Native Hawaiian or Pacific Islander alone (NH)	0	0	0	0.00%	0.00%	0.00%
Other race alone (NH)	0	4	68	0.00%	0.18%	2.82%
Mixed race or Multiracial (NH)	54	87	41	3.42%	3.83%	1.70%
Hispanic or Latino (any race)	20	41	17	1.27%	1.81%	0.71%
Total	1,579	2,271	2,410	100.00%	100.00%	100.00%

As of the census of 2000, there were 1,579 people, 189 households, and 133 families residing in the CDP. The population density was 510.7 inhabitants per square mile (197.2/km^{2}). There were 220 housing units at an average density of 71.2 per square mile (27.5/km^{2}). The racial makeup of the CDP was 84.17% African American, 11.21% White, 0.38% Native American, 0.13% Asian, 0.13% from other races, and 3.99% from two or more races. Hispanic or Latino of any race were 1.27% of the population.

There were 189 households, out of which 26.5% had children under the age of 18 living with them, 56.1% were married couples living together, 9.0% had a female householder with no husband present, and 29.6% were non-families. 28.6% of all households were made up of individuals, and 17.5% had someone living alone who was 65 years of age or older. The average household size was 2.57 and the average family size was 3.14.

In the CDP the population was spread out, with 7.8% under the age of 18, 69.5% from 18 to 24, 9.4% from 25 to 44, 7.4% from 45 to 64, and 5.9% who were 65 years of age or older. The median age was 21 years. For every 100 females, there were 93.5 males. For every 100 females age 18 and over, there were 89.8 males.

The median income for a household in the CDP was $31,641, and the median income for a family was $39,038. Males had a median income of $4,706 versus $23,906 for females. The per capita income for the CDP was $10,483. None of the families and 6.5% of the population were living below the poverty line, including no under eighteens and 16.3% of those over 64.

== Education ==
The community has two historically black universities: Wilberforce University, with its associated Payne Theological Seminary, and Central State University.

=== Wilberforce University ===
Wilberforce University was established privately in 1856 as a joint project by the Methodist Episcopal Church of Cincinnati and African Methodist Episcopal Church. In 1863 the AME Church sold another property in order to buy the college after its temporary closing due to financial problems during the war. It was the first college to be owned and operated by African Americans. Bishop Daniel Payne, who led the founding and later purchase of the college, was its first president and served for many years. Many prominent scholars have taught there.

Among them was Charles Young, a West Point graduate and 19th-century US Army officer who served with the Buffalo Soldiers in the West and later taught at Wilberforce. Born into slavery, Young became the highest-ranking African-American officer in the US Army, a status that lasted until after World War I. His former residence, Youngsholm, has been designated as a National Historic Landmark and the Charles Young Buffalo Soldiers National Monument.

Their most famous graduate is Dorothy Vaughan, who is one of the women featured in Margot Lee Shetterly's history Hidden Figures: The Story of the African-American Women Who Helped Win the Space Race (2016). It was adapted as a biographical film of the same name, also released in 2016.

=== Central State University ===
Central State University was established by the state legislature in 1887 as a commercial, normal and industrial department, which was located at Wilberforce in the late 19th century. In 1947, the department had expanded to four-year programs and it was established as a separate institution. With continued development, it achieved university status in 1965.
