= King Tornado =

- University: King University
- Nickname: The Tornado
- NCAA: Division II
- Conference: Conference Carolinas (primary)
- Athletic director: David Hicks
- Location: Bristol, Tennessee
- Varsity teams: 27 (10 men's, 12 women's, 5 co-ed)
- Basketball arena: Student Center Complex
- Baseball stadium: King Baseball Field
- Softball stadium: King Softball Field
- Soccer stadium: Parks Field
- Tennis venue: King Tennis Courts
- Colors: Scarlet and navy
- Mascot: Twister the Lion
- Website: www.kingtornado.com
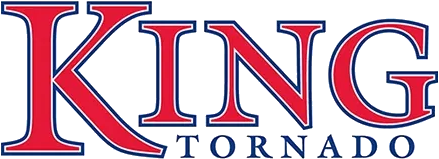

The King Tornado are the athletic teams that represent King University, located in Bristol, Tennessee, in intercollegiate sports as a member of the NCAA Division II ranks, primarily competing in the Conference Carolinas (CC) since the 2011–12 academic year. They were also a member of the National Christian College Athletic Association (NCCAA), primarily competing as an independent in the Mid-East Region of the Division I level. The Tornado previously competed as an NCAA D-II Independent from 2009–10 to 2010–11; and in the Appalachian Athletic Conference (AAC) of the National Association of Intercollegiate Athletics (NAIA) from 2001–02 to 2008–09.

== Conference affiliations ==
NAIA

- Appalachian Athletic Conference (2000–2009)
- Independent (2009–2010)

NCAA

- Independent (2010–2011)
- Conference Carolinas (2011–present)

== Varsity teams ==
King competes in 25 intercollegiate varsity sports: Men's sports include baseball, basketball, cross country, golf, soccer, swimming & diving, tennis, track & field, volleyball and wrestling; while women's sports include acrobatics & tumbling, basketball, cross country, golf, softball, soccer, swimming & diving, tennis, track & field, triathlon, volleyball and wrestling; and co-ed sports include bass fishing, cheerleading, cycling, dance and eSports.

== Nickname ==
The university nickname, the Tornado, was adopted in 1922 following a 206–0 football win over North Carolina rival Lenoir College (now Lenoir–Rhyne University). The headline in a local newspaper covering the event said "King College's Victory Was 'Tornado' Of Week's Games" and began referring to the football team as the "Tornado". This is a record score which stands in the annals of collegiate football as one of the highest ever won in a game of football.

== Mascot ==
Twister, a lion, was unveiled as the university's new mascot on September 2, 2011. Twister is a fearless lion that represents the determination and courage reflected in King's adventure as an NCAA Division II institution. Equipped with his King colors of navy blue and scarlet red, Twister dons the number 11 on his back while rallying those in Tornado Athletics and the King University.
