= 2023 UC Irvine Anteaters men's volleyball team =

American college volleyball season

2023 UC Irvine Anteaters men's volleyball
- Conference: Big West Conference
- Record: 18–11 (6–4 Big West)
- Head coach: David Kniffin (11th season)
- Assistant coaches: Erin Johnson (5th season); Ryan Ammerman (1st season)
- Home arena: Bren Events Center

2023 Big West Conference men's volleyball standings
	Conf.				Overall
Team	W		L	PCT	W		L	PCT
No. 2 Hawaii ‍†‍‡‍^{y}	9	–	1	.900	29	–	3	.906
No. 4 Long Beach State ‍†‍‍^{y}	9	–	1	.900	21	–	5	.808
No. 5 UC Irvine ‍‍‍	6	–	4	.600	18	–	11	.621
UC Santa Barbara ‍‍‍	3	–	7	.300	8	–	17	.320
UC San Diego ‍‍‍	2	–	8	.200	8	–	17	.320
Cal State Northridge ‍‍‍	1	–	9	.100	12	–	16	.429
† – Conference champion ‡ – Big West tournament champion y – Invited to the NCAA tournament Rankings from AVCA

The 2023 UC Irvine Anteaters men's volleyball team represented the University of California, Irvine in the 2023 NCAA Division I & II men's volleyball season. The Anteaters, led by eleventh year head coach David Kniffin, played their home games at the Bren Events Center. The Anteaters competed as members of the Big West Conference and were picked to finish third in the Big West preseason poll.

== Season highlights ==
- Joe Karlous won the National Setter of the Week award for Week 0 games.

== Preseason ==
=== Coaches poll ===
The preseason poll was released on December 21, 2022. UC Irvine was picked to finish third in the Big West Conference standings.

Predicted finish	Team	Votes (1st place)
1	Hawai'i	25 (5)
2	Long Beach State	19
3	UC Irvine	17 (1)
4	UC Santa Barbara	13
5	CSUN	10
6	UC San Diego	6

== Roster ==
2023 UC Irvine Anteaters Roster
Defensive Specialist/Libero: 1 Davis Lau - Senior; 3 Cole Power - Senior; 8 Gustavo Gomes - (redshirt) Sophomore; Middle Blockers: 13 Beck Weber - Freshman; 17 Connor Campbell - Junior; 18 Julian Albulescu - Freshman; 23 Maxim Grigoriev - Freshman	Outside Hitters: 2 Akhil Tangutur - Senior; 6 Cole Gillis - (redshirt) Junior; 7 Doug Dahm - (redshirt) Junior; 10 Conner Dahm - (redshirt) Sophomore; 11 Francesco Sani - Junior; 14 Brandon Marina - Freshman; 19 Josh McCune - Freshman; 20 Hilir Henno - Sophomore; 30 Stefan Vartigov - Freshman	Opposite Hitters: 5 William D'Arcy - Freshman; Setters: 4 Patrick Vorenkamp - (redshirt) Senior; 9 Dylan Zhai - Junior; 12 Joe Karlous - (redshirt) Junior; 15 Cade Martin - Sophomore; 22 Aidan Schulten - Freshman

== Schedule ==
TV/Internet Streaming/Radio information:

ESPN+ will carry all home and conference road games. All other road broadcasts will be carried by the schools respective streaming partner.

Date Time	Opponent	Rank	Arena City (Tournament)	Television	Score	Attendance	Record (Big West Record)
1/6; 3 p.m.	vs. #14 Lewis	#8	Smith Fieldhouse; Provo, UT	byutv.org	W 3–1 (26–28, 28–26, 25–22, 25–23)	249	1–0
1/7; 3 p.m.	vs. McKendree	#8	Smith Fieldhouse; Provo, UT	byutv.org	W 3–0 (36–34, 25–15, 25–19)	152	2–0
1/13; 7 p.m.	Emmanuel	#7	Bren Events Center; Irvine, CA	ESPN+	W 3–0 (25–12, 25–21, 25–11)	578	3-0
1/18; 7 p.m.	# 10 USC	#7	Bren Events Center; Irvine, CA	ESPN+	W 3–2 (25–22, 25–27, 23–25, 25-20, 15-11)	1,534	4-0
1/20; 7 p.m.	Concordia Irvine	#7	Bren Events Center; Irvine, CA	ESPN+	W 3–0 (25–21, 25–18, 25–16)	702	5-0
1/21; 7 p.m.	@ Concordia Irvine	#7	CU Arena; Irvine, CA	EagleEye	W 3–0 (25–17, 25–20, 25–7)	112	6-0
1/25; 7 p.m.	#12 BYU	#6	Bren Events Center; Irvine, CA	ESPN+	W 3–0 (25–21, 25–23, 25–15)	1,102	7-0
1/27; 7 p.m.	#12 BYU	#6	Bren Events Center; Irvine, CA	ESPN+	L 2-3 (24-26, 25-21, 22-25, 25-19, 9-15)	1,743	7-1
2/03; 6 p.m.	@ #9 Grand Canyon	#7	GCU Arena; Phoenix, AZ	ESPN+	L 1-3 (19-25, 19-25, 25-12, 22-25)	1,108	7-2
2/04; 4 p.m.	@ #9 Grand Canyon	#7	GCU Arena; Phoenix, AZ	ESPN+	L 2-3 (21-25, 25-21, 25-19, 27-29, 13-15)	704	7-3
2/08; 7 p.m.	@ #6 Pepperdine	#7	Firestone Fieldhouse; Malibu, CA	WavesCast	W 3-2 (29-27, 20-25, 25-20, 27-29, 15-9)	623	8-3
2/10; 7 p.m.	#6 Pepperdine	#7	Bren Events Center; Irvine, CA	ESPN+	W 3-1 (25-20, 23-25, 25-20, 25-17)	1,292	9-3
2/24; 7 p.m.	#2 UCLA	#6	Bren Events Center; Irvine, CA	ESPN+	L 1-3 (25-17, 23-25, 19-25, 16-25)	2,411	9-4
2/26; 5 p.m.	@ #2 UCLA	#6	Pauley Pavilion; Los Angeles, CA	P12+ UCLA	L 1-3 (25-20, 22-25, 16-25, 25-27)	1,306	9-5
3/04; 3 p.m.	@ #10 Stanford	#6	Maples Pavilion; Stanford, CA	P12+ STAN	W 3-0 (25-17, 25-23, 25-22)	793	10-5
3/05; 5 p.m.	#3 Penn State	#6	Bren Events Center; Irvine, CA	ESPN+	L 2-3 (34-32, 23-25, 25-18, 22-25, 11-15)	881	10-6
3/10; 7 p.m.	UC San Diego*	#6	Bren Events Center; Irvine, CA	ESPN+	W 3-0 (25-17, 25-23, 25-16)	932	11-6 (1-0)
3/11; 7 p.m.	@ UC San Diego*	#6	LionTree Arena; La Jolla, CA	ESPN+	W 3-0 (25-16, 25-17, 25-14)	910	12-6 (2-0)
3/16; 7 p.m.	@ UC Santa Barbara*	#6	Robertson Gymnasium; Santa Barbara, CA	ESPN+	W 3-2 (23-25, 22-25, 25-15, 25-11, 15-11)	312	13-6 (3-0)
3/17; 7 p.m.	UC Santa Barbara*	#6	Bren Events Center; Irvine, CA	ESPN+	W 3-0 (25-23, 25-22, 25-20)	790	14-6 (4-0)
3/31; 7 p.m.	#15 CSUN*	#5	Bren Events Center; Irvine, CA	ESPN+	W 3-0 (25-19, 25-21, 25-19)	620	15-6 (5-0)
4/01; 7 p.m.	@ #15 CSUN*	#5	Premier America Credit Union Arena; Northridge, CA	ESPN+	W 3-0 (25-22, 28-26, 25-19)	186	16-6 (6-0)
4/07; 9 p.m.	@ #1 Hawai'i*	#5	Stan Sheriff Center; Honolulu, HI	ESPN+	L 1-3 (16-25, 25-17, 23-25, 22-25)	7,399	16-7 (6-1)
4/08; 9 p.m.	@ #1 Hawai'i *	#5	Stan Sheriff Center; Honolulu, HI	ESPN+	L 0-3 (24-26, 20-25, 19-25)	8,409	16-8 (6-2)
4/14; 7 p.m.	@ #4 Long Beach State*	#5	Walter Pyramid; Long Beach, CA	ESPN+	L 0-3 (18-25, 19-25, 22-25)	2,409	16-9 (6-3)
4/15; 5 p.m.	#4 Long Beach State*	#5	Bren Events Center; Irvine, CA	ESPN+	L 2-3 (25-22, 25-18, 20-25, 20-25, 13-15)	1,651	16-10 (6-4)
4/20; 7:30 p.m.	CSUN^{(6)}	#5^{(3)}	Bren Events Center; Irvine, CA (Big West Quarterfinal)	ESPN+	W 3-0 (25-21, 25-22, 25-18)	1,008	17-10
4/21; 7:30 p.m.	#4 Long Beach State^{(2)}	#5^{(3)}	Bren Events Center; Irvine, CA (Big West Semifinal)	ESPN+	W 3-0 (25-21, 25-17, 25-20)	2,543	18-10
4/22; 7 p.m.	#1 Hawai'i^{(1)}	#5^{(3)}	Bren Events Center; Irvine, CA (Big West Championship)	ESPNU	L 1-3 (18-25, 25-21, 13-25, 22-25)	4,064	18-11

*-Indicates conference match.
Times listed are Pacific Time Zone.

== Announcers for televised games ==
- Lewis: No commentary
- McKendree: No commentary
- Emmanuel: Rob Espero & Charlie Brande
- USC: Rob Espero & Charlie Brande
- Concordia: Robbie Loya & Charlie Brande
- Concordia: Jeff Runyan
- BYU: Rob Espero & Charlie Brande
- BYU:
- Grand Canyon:
- Grand Canyon:
- Pepperdine:
- Pepperdine:
- UCLA:
- UCLA:
- Stanford:
- Penn State:
- UC San Diego:
- UC San Diego:
- UC Santa Barbara:
- UC Santa Barbara:
- CSUN:
- CSUN:
- Hawai'i:
- Hawai'i:
- Long Beach Sttae:
- Long Beach State:

== Rankings ==
Ranking movements Legend: ██ Increase in ranking ██ Decrease in ranking
	Week																	
Poll	Pre	1	2	3	4	5	6	7	8	9	10	11	12	13	14	15	16	Final
AVCA Coaches	8	7	7	6	7	7	6	6	6	6	6	6	5	5	5	5	5	5
Off the Block Media	Not released		7	5	6	10	6	6	6	6	6	6	6	6	6	7		7

^The Media did not release a Pre-season or Week 1 poll.
