= 2023 Cal State Northridge Matadors men's volleyball team =

American college volleyball season

2023 Cal State Northridge Matadors men's volleyball
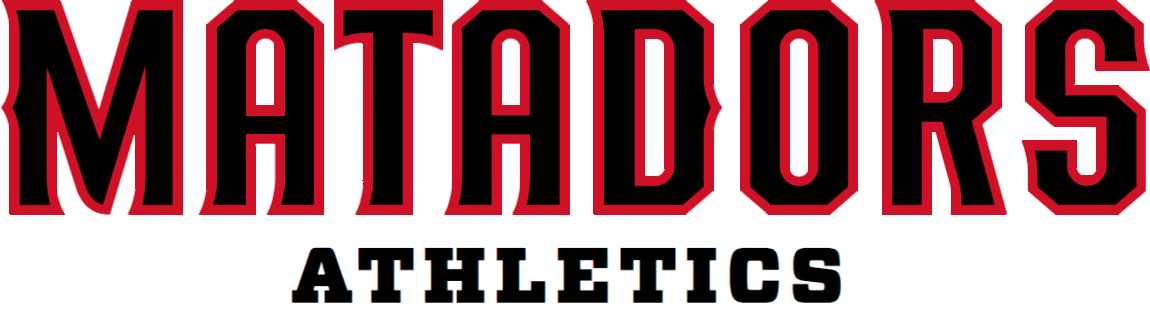
- Conference: Big West Conference
- Record: 12–16 (1-9 Big West)
- Head coach: Theo Edwards (1st season)
- Assistant coaches: Ryan Mason (1st season); Greg Faulkner (5th season)
- Home arena: Premier America Credit Union Arena

2023 Big West Conference men's volleyball standings
	Conf.				Overall
Team	W		L	PCT	W		L	PCT
No. 2 Hawaii ‍†‍‡‍^{y}	9	–	1	.900	29	–	3	.906
No. 4 Long Beach State ‍†‍‍^{y}	9	–	1	.900	21	–	5	.808
No. 5 UC Irvine ‍‍‍	6	–	4	.600	18	–	11	.621
UC Santa Barbara ‍‍‍	3	–	7	.300	8	–	17	.320
UC San Diego ‍‍‍	2	–	8	.200	8	–	17	.320
Cal State Northridge ‍‍‍	1	–	9	.100	12	–	16	.429
† – Conference champion ‡ – Big West tournament champion y – Invited to the NCAA tournament Rankings from AVCA

The 2023 CSUN Matadors men's volleyball team represented California State University, Northridge in the 2023 NCAA Division I & II men's volleyball season. The Matadors, led by first year head coach Theo Edwards, played their home games at Premier America Credit Union Arena (formerly the Matadome). The Matadors competed as members of the Big West Conference and were picked the finish sixth in the Big West preseason poll.

== Preseason ==
=== Coaches poll ===
The preseason poll was released on December 21, 2022. CSUN was picked to finish fifth in the Big West Conference standings.

Predicted finish	Team	Votes (1st place)
1	Hawai'i	25 (5)
2	Long Beach State	19
3	UC Irvine	17 (1)
4	UC Santa Barbara	13
5	CSUN	10
6	UC San Diego	6

== Roster ==
2023 CSUN Roster
Defensive Specialist/Libero: 6 Chris Karnezis - Freshman; 10 Ben Martinez - Freshman; 22 Taylan Cook - Senior; Middle Blockers: 4 Logan Pohl - Freshman; 5 Emmanuel Wandji - Freshman; 11 Jackson Payne - (redshirt) Sophomore; 13 Olumide Allen - Sophomore; 16 Jano Tello - (redshirt) Junior	Outside Hitters: 2 Lorenzo Bertozzi - (redshirt) Sophomore; 7 Kyle Hobus - (redshirt) Junior; 8 Inaki Bustamante - Senior; 12 Griffin Walters - Junior; 17 Matteo Salvador - Sophomore; 21 Cody Bowker - (redshirt) Freshman; 24 Trevor Lau - Freshman	Opposite Hitters: 1 Nathan Merren - (redshirt) Sophomore; 3 Luke Krzmarzick - (redshirt) Senior; 15 Malcolm King - Freshman; 18 Jalen Phillips - Freshman; Setters: 9 Lance Krenik - (redshirt) Freshman; 19 Jeff Hanmer - (redshirt) Freshman; 23 Donovan Constable - Sophomorer

== Schedule ==
TV/Internet Streaming/Radio information:

ESPN+ will carry most home and all conference road games. All other road broadcasts will be carried by the schools respective streaming partner.

Date Time	Opponent	Rank	Arena City (Tournament)	Television	Score	Attendance	Record (Big West Record)
1/05; 5:30 p.m.	vs. #2 UCLA		Robertson Gymnasium; Santa Barbara, CA (UCSB Asics Invitational)		L 0–3 (18–25, 21–25, 18–25)	146	0–1
1/06; 8 p.m.	vs. #10 USC		Robertson Gymnasium; Santa Barbara, CA (UCSB Asics Invitational)		L 0–3 (22–25, 26–28, 20–25)	92	0–2
1/07; 3 p.m.	vs. Lincoln Memorial		Robertson Gymnasium; Santa Barbara, CA		W 3–0 (25–20, 25–21, 25–21)	132	1–2
1/13; 7 p.m.	Cal Lutheran		Premier America Credit Union Arena; Northridge, CA	ESPN+	W 3–0 (25–22, 25–15, 25–12)	201	2-2
1/18; 7 p.m.	The Master's		Premier America Credit Union Arena; Northridge, CA	ESPN+	W 3–1 (25–22, 25-19, 18–25, 25-22)	135	3-2
1/20; 7 p.m.	Menlo		Premier America Credit Union Arena; Northridge, CA	ESPN+	W 3–0 (25–22, 25–21, 25–17)	192	4-2
1/25; 7 p.m.	#10 USC		Premier America Credit Union Arena; Northridge, CA	ESPN+	L 1-3 (22-25, 25–19, 16-25, 17-25)	422	4-3
1/27; 7 p.m.	#2 UCLA		Premier America Credit Union Arena; Northridge, CA	ESPN+	L 0-3 (18-25, 16-25, 24-26)	507	4-4
2/01; 7 p.m.	Vanguard		Premier America Credit Union Arena; Northridge, CA	ESPN+	L 0-3 (22-25, 20-25, 17-25)	205	4-5
2/03; 5 p.m.	#6 Stanford		Premier America Credit Union Arena; Northridge, CA	ESPN+	W 3–2 (21-25, 26–24, 22–25, 25-18, 15-13)	425	5-5
2/08; 4 p.m.	@ Princeton	#15	Dillon Gymnasium; Princeton, NJ	ESPN+	W 3–2 (27-25, 17–25, 15–25, 32-30, 15-11)	0	6-5
2/10; 7 p.m.	@ NJIT	#15	Wellness and Events Center; Newark, NJ	ESPN+	W 3–2 (25-19, 22-25, 22-25, 28-26, 17-15)	443	7-5
2/11; 9 a.m.	@ Fairleigh Dickinson	#15	Rothman Center; Teaneck, NJ	NEC Front Row	W 3–0 (25-11, 25-15, 25-23)	118	8-5
2/16; 7 p.m.	Benedictine	#14	Premier America Credit Union Arena; Northridge, CA	ESPN+	W 3–0 (25-14, 26-24, 25-23)	176	9-5
2/22; 7 p.m.	Westcliff	#14	Premier America Credit Union Arena; Northridge, CA	ESPN+	W 3–0 (25-21, 25-23, 25-13)	188	10-5
2/24; 7 p.m.	@ UC San Diego*	#14	LionTree Arena; La Jolla, CA	ESPN+	W 3–1 (23-25, 25-18, 25-23, 25-21)	556	11-5 (1-0)
3/03; 5 p.m.	@ #10 Stanford	#14	Maples Pavilion; Stanford, CA	P12+ STAN	W 3–0 (25-20, 25-23, 26-24)	436	12-5
3/16; 7 p.m.	UC San Diego*	#12	Premier America Credit Union Arena; Northridge, CA	ESPN+	L 0-3 (21-25, 22-25, 20-25)	280	12-6 (1-1)
3/18; 7 p.m.	Daemen	#12	Premier America Credit Union Arena; Northridge, CA	ESPN+	L 2-3 (19-25, 21-25, 25-19, 25-22, 12-15)	144	12-7
3/24; 7 p.m.	#2 Hawai'i*	#14	Premier America Credit Union Arena; Northridge, CA	ESPN+	L 0-3 (22-25, 14-25, 18-25)	513	12-8 (1-2)
3/25; 7 p.m.	#2 Hawai'i*	#14	Premier America Credit Union Arena; Northridge, CA	ESPN+	L 0-3 (17-25, 18-25, 15-25)	522	12-9 (1-3)
3/31; 7 p.m.	@ #5 UC Irvine*	#15	Bren Events Center; Irvine, CA	ESPN+	L 0-3 (19-25, 21-25, 19-25)	620	12-10 (1-4)
4/01; 7 p.m.	#5 UC Irvine*	#15	Premier America Credit Union Arena; Northridge, CA	ESPN+	L 0-3 (22-25, 26-28, 19-25)	186	12-11 (1-5)
4/07; 7 p.m.	#4 Long Beach State*	#15	Premier America Credit Union Arena; Northridge, CA	ESPN+	L 2-3 (27-25, 25-22, 17-25, 21-25, 9-15)	696	12-12 (1-6)
4/08; 7 p.m.	@ #4 Long Beach State*	#15	Walter Pyramid; Long Beach, CA	ESPN+	L 0-3 (19-25, 18-25, 16-25)	1,634	12-13 (1-7)
4/14; 7 p.m.	UC Santa Barbara*	#14	Premier America Credit Union Arena; Northridge, CA	ESPN+	L 0-3 (20-25, 22-25, 22-25)	289	12-14 (1-8)
4/15; 7 p.m.	@ UC Santa Barbara*	#14	Robertson Gymnasium; Santa Barbara, CA	ESPN+	L 1-3 (18-25, 25-27, 25-21, 21-25)	325	12-15 (1-9)
4/20; 7:30 p.m.	@ #5 UC Irvine^{(3)}	^{(6)}	Bren Events Center; Irvine, CA (Big West Quarterfinal)	ESPN+	L 0-3 (21-25, 22-25, 18-25)	1,008	12-16

*-Indicates conference match.
Times listed are Pacific Time Zone.

== Announcers for televised games ==
- Cal Lutheran: Darren Preston
- The Master's: Darren Preston
- Menlo: Darren Preston
- USC:
- UCLA:
- Vanguard:
- Stanford:
- Princeton:
- NJIT:
- Fairleigh Dickinson:
- Benedictine:
- Westcliff:
- UC San Diego:
- Stanford:
- UC San Diego:
- Daemen:
- Hawai'i:
- Hawai'i:
- UC Irvine:
- UC Irvine:
- Long Beach State:
- Long Beach State:
- UC Santa Barbara:
- UC Santa Barbara:
- Big West Tournament:

== Rankings ==
Ranking movements Legend: ██ Increase in ranking ██ Decrease in ranking RV = Received votes
	Week																	
Poll	Pre	1	2	3	4	5	6	7	8	9	10	11	12	13	14	15	16	Final
AVCA Coaches	RV	RV		RV	RV	15	14	14	14	13	12	14	15	15	14	RV	RV	RV
Off the Block Media	Not released									RV	RV							

^The Media did not release a Pre-season poll.
