= 2023 UC San Diego Tritons men's volleyball team =

American college volleyball season

2023 UC San Diego Tritons men's volleyball
- Conference: Big West Conference
- Record: 8–17 (2–8 Big West)
- Head coach: Brad Rostratter (1st season)
- Assistant coaches: Jon Girten (6th season); Taylor Hammond (1st season)
- Home arena: LionTree Arena

2023 Big West Conference men's volleyball standings
	Conf.				Overall
Team	W		L	PCT	W		L	PCT
No. 2 Hawai'i ‍†‍‡‍^{y}	9	–	1	.900	29	–	3	.906
No. 4 Long Beach State ‍†‍‍^{y}	9	–	1	.900	21	–	5	.808
No. 5 UC Irvine ‍‍‍	6	–	4	.600	18	–	11	.621
UC Santa Barbara ‍‍‍	3	–	7	.300	8	–	17	.320
UC San Diego ‍‍‍	2	–	8	.200	8	–	17	.320
CSUN ‍‍‍	1	–	9	.100	12	–	16	.429
† – Conference champion ‡ – 2023 Big West Tournament champion: y- Invited to the NCAA volleyball tournament As of March 13, 2025 Rankings from AVCA

The 2023 UC San Diego Tritons men's volleyball team represented the University of California San Diego in the 2023 NCAA Division I & II men's volleyball season. The Tritons, led by first year head coach Brad Rostratter, played their home games at LionTree Arena. The Tritons competed as members of the Big West Conference and were picked to finish sixth in the Big West preseason poll.

== Preseason ==
=== Coaches poll ===
The preseason poll was released on December 21, 2022. UC San Diego was picked to finish last in the Big West Conference standings.

Predicted finish	Team	Votes (1st place)
1	Hawai'i	25 (5)
2	Long Beach State	19
3	UC Irvine	17 (1)
4	UC Santa Barbara	13
5	CSUN	10
6	UC San Diego	6

== Roster ==
2023 UC San Diego Tritons Roster
Defensive Specialist/Libero: 5 Evan Boyle - Freshman; 20 Paya Vatanshenas - (redshirt) Sophomore; Middle Blockers: 12 Nick Rigo - Junior; 14 Jim Garrison - (redshirt) Freshman; 15 Zachary Weston - Sophomore; 23 Spiro Maranda - Sophomore; 24 Peter Selcho - (redshirt) Freshman; 25 Michael Urdahl - (redshirt) Senior	Outside Hitters: 1 Ben Blakely - Sophomore; 6 Leo Pravednikov - Freshman; 7 Matthew Lim - Sophomore; 9 Ryan Ka - (redshirt) Senior; 10 Josh Schellinger - (redshirt) Freshman; 11 Brett Pursley - (redshirt) Freshman; 21 Joshua Ewert - Freshman; 22 Sam Warren - Sophomore	Opposite Hitters: 1 Ben Blakely - Sophomore; 3 Gabriel Dyer - Sophomore; 13 Berkeley Miesfeld - (redshirt) Senior; 16 Michael Robertson - Freshman; Setters: 2 Cameron Wurl - Freshman; 3 Gabriel Dyer - Sophomore; 18 Andrew Boyle - Junior

== Schedule ==
TV/Internet Streaming/Radio information:

ESPN+ will carry all home and conference road games. All other road broadcasts will be carried by the schools respective streaming partner.

Date Time	Opponent	Rank	Arena City (Tournament)	Television	Score	Attendance	Record (Big West Record)
1/5; 8 p.m.	vs. Lincoln Memorial		Robertson Gymnasium; Santa Barbara, CA (UCSB Asics Invitational)		W 3–2 (25–18, 15–25, 25–23, 20–25, 16–14)	97	1–0
1/6; 3 p.m.	vs. #2 UCLA		Robertson Gymnasium; Santa Barbara, CA (UCSB Asics Invitational)		L 0–3 (18–25, 16–25, 14–25)	115	1–1
1/7; 5:30 p.m.	vs. #10 USC		Robertson Gymnasium; Santa Barbara, CA (UCSB Asics Invitational)		L 2–3 (25–22, 25–20, 16–25, 22–25, 12–15)	212	1–2
1/13; 5 p.m.	@ #12 Loyola Chicago		Joseph J. Gentile Arena; Chicago, IL	ESPN+	L 0-3 (20–25, 24–26, 18–25)	1,403	1-3
1/14; 5 p.m.	@ #15 Lewis		Neil Carey Arena; Romeoville, IL	GLVC SN	L 1-3 (25-27, 20–25, 25–23, 23-25)	800	1-4
1/17; 6 p.m.	Emmanuel		LionTree Arena; La Jolla, CA	ESPN+	W 3–0 (25–12, 25–20, 25–16)	295	2–4
1/18; 7 p.m.	Menlo		LionTree Arena; La Jolla, CA	ESPN+	W 3–0 (25–14, 25–21, 25–22)	433	3-4
1/21; 7 p.m.	@ #2 UCLA		Pauley Pavilion; Los Angeles, CA	P12 LA	L 0-3 (15-25, 23–25, 18–25)	923	3-5
1/28; 4 p.m.	vs. Erskine		GCU Arena; Phoenix, AZ	GCU TV	W 3-0 (25-21, 25–20, 25–15)	105	4-5
1/29; 2 p.m.	@ #9 Grand Canyon		GCU Arena; Phoenix, AZ	ESPN+	L 0-3 (19-25, 19–25, 23–25)	459	4-6
2/3; 7 p.m.	Ottawa		LionTree Arena; La Jolla, CA	ESPN+	W 3-0 (25-15, 25–16, 25–20)	341	5-6
2/14; 7 p.m.	Westcliff		LionTree Arena; La Jolla, CA	ESPN+	W 3-0 (26-24, 25–17, 25–10)	121	6-6
2/21; 7 p.m.	@ Concordia Irvine		CU Arena; Irvine, CA	EagleEye	L 1-3 (23-25, 25-22, 15-25, 21-25)	126	6-7
2/24; 7 p.m.	#14 CSUN*		LionTree Arena; La Jolla, CA	ESPN+	L 1-3 (25-23, 18-25, 23-25, 21-25)	556	6-8 (0-1)
3/03; 7 p.m.	@ UC Santa Barbara*		Robertson Gymnasium; Santa Barbara, CA	ESPN+	L 1-3 (25-20, 22-25, 26-28, 22-25)	403	6-9 (0-2)
3/05; 2 p.m.	#12 Ball State		LionTree Arena; La Jolla, CA	ESPN+	L 2-3 (25-23, 19-25, 15-25, 25-23, 12-15)	301	6-10
3/10; 7 p.m.	@ UC Irvine*		Bren Events Center; Irvine, CA	ESPN+	L 0-3 (17-25, 23-25, 16-25)	932	6-11 (0-3)
3/11; 7 p.m.	UC Irvine*		LionTree Arena; La Jolla, CA	ESPN+	L 0-3 (16-25, 17-25, 14-25)	910	6-12 (0-4)
3/16; 7 p.m.	@ #12 CSUN*		Premier America Credit Union Arena; Northridge, CA	ESPN+	W 3-0' (25-21, 25-22, 25-20)	280	7-12 (1-4)
3/31; 7 p.m.	#4 Long Beach State*		LionTree Arena; La Jolla, CA	ESPN+	L 0-3 (22-25, 13-25, 16-25)	760	7-13 (1-5)
4/01; 7 p.m.	@ #4 Long Beach State*		Walter Pyramid; Long Beach, CA	ESPN+	L 0-3 (15-25, 17-25, 13-25)	1,413	7-14 (1-6)
4/07; 7 p.m.	UC Santa Barbara*		LionTree Arena; La Jolla, CA	ESPN+	W 3-2 (25-20, 20-25, 19-25, 25-14, 15-13)	851	8-14 (2-6)
4/14; 10 p.m.	@ #1 Hawai'i*		Stan Sheriff Center; Honolulu, HI	ESPN+	L 1-3 (26-28, 17-25, 25-19, 14-25)	7,022	8-15 (2-7)
4/15; 10 p.m.	@ #1 Hawai'i*		Stan Sheriff Center; Honolulu, HI	ESPN+	L 0-3 (19-25, 22-25, 21-25)	10,300	8-16 (2-8)
4/20; 5 p.m.	UC Santa Barbara^{(4)}	^{(5)}	Bren Events Center; Irvine, CA (Big West Quarterfinal)	ESPN+	L 2-3 (18-25, 25-23, 21-25, 25-20, 12-15)	1	8-17

*-Indicates conference match.
Times listed are Pacific Time Zone.

== Announcers for televised games ==
- Loyola Chicago: Ray Gooden & Henry Payne
- Lewis: Allie Lankowicz & Hannah Alvey
- Emmanuel: Bryan Fenley & Ricci Luyties
- Menlo: Bryan Fenley & Ricci Luyties
- UCLA:
- Erskine:
- Grand Canyon:
- Ottawa:
- USC:
- Westcliff:
- Concordia Irvine:
- CSUN:
- UC Santa Barbara:
- Ball State:
- UC Irvine:
- UC Irvine:
- CSUN:
- Long Beach State:
- Long Beach State:
- UC Santa Barbara:
- Hawai'i:
- Hawai'i:
- Big West Tournament:

== Rankings ==
Ranking movements Legend: ██ Increase in ranking ██ Decrease in ranking — = Not ranked RV = Received votes
	Week																	
Poll	Pre	1	2	3	4	5	6	7	8	9	10	11	12	13	14	15	16	Final
AVCA Coaches	RV	—	—															
Off the Block Media	Not released		—															

^The Media did not release a Pre-season or Week 1 poll.
