= 2023 UC Santa Barbara Gauchos men's volleyball team =

College volleyball team

2023 UC Santa Barbara Gauchos men's volleyball
- Conference: Big West Conference
- Record: 8–17 (3–7 Big West)
- Head coach: Rick McLaughlin (15th season)
- Assistant coaches: Blaine Nielsen (4th season); Jonah Seif (4th season)
- Home arena: Robertson Gymnasium

2023 Big West Conference men's volleyball standings
	Conf.				Overall
Team	W		L	PCT	W		L	PCT
No. 2 Hawaii ‍†‍‡‍^{y}	9	–	1	.900	29	–	3	.906
No. 4 Long Beach State ‍†‍‍^{y}	9	–	1	.900	21	–	5	.808
No. 5 UC Irvine ‍‍‍	6	–	4	.600	18	–	11	.621
UC Santa Barbara ‍‍‍	3	–	7	.300	8	–	17	.320
UC San Diego ‍‍‍	2	–	8	.200	8	–	17	.320
Cal State Northridge ‍‍‍	1	–	9	.100	12	–	16	.429
† – Conference champion ‡ – Big West tournament champion y – Invited to the NCAA tournament Rankings from AVCA

The 2023 UC Santa Barbara Gauchos men's volleyball team represented University of California, Santa Barbara in the 2023 NCAA Division I & II men's volleyball season. The Gauchos, led by fifteenth year head coach Rick McLaughlin, played their home games between Robertson Gymnasium. The Gauchos compete as members of the Big West Conference and were picked the finish fourth in the Big West preseason poll.

== Preseason ==
=== Coaches poll ===
The preseason poll was released on December 21, 2022. UC Santa Barbara was picked to finish fourth in the Big West Conference standings.

Predicted finish	Team	Votes (1st place)
1	Hawai'i	25 (5)
2	Long Beach State	19
3	UC Irvine	17 (1)
4	UC Santa Barbara	13
5	CSUN	10
6	UC San Diego	6

== Roster ==
2023 UC Santa Barbara Gauchos Roster
Defensive Specialist/Libero: 1 Jaden Glenn - (redshirt) Sophomore; 22 Max Gordon - Sophomore; Middle Blockers: 6 Donovan Todorov - (redshirt) Sophomore; 15 Dain Johnson - (redshirt) Sophomore; 20 Reece Francke - (redshirt) Sophomore; 24 Brandon Hicks - Senior	Outside Hitters: 3 Owen Birg - (redshirt) Freshman; 5 Patrick Kane - Freshman; 7 Ben Coordt - (redshirt) Freshman; 8 Sam Collins - (redshirt) Sophomore; 9 Ryan Wilcox - Senior; 10 Sam Meister - (redshirt) Freshman; 11 Dominic Lang - (redshirt) Sophomore; 12 Dayne Chalmers - (redshirt) Junior; 14 Andrew Reavis - (redshirt) Sophomore; 19 Ben Pearson - Freshman; 21 Nick Amoruso - (redshirt) Junior; 22 Max Gordon - Sophomore; 23 Owen Loncar - Freshman	Opposite Hitters: 2 Geste Bianchi - (redshirt) Sophomore; 3 Owen Birg - (redshirt) Freshman; 4 Rees Barnett - (redshirt) Sophomore; 10 Sam Meister - (redshirt) Freshman; 21 Nick Amoruso - (redshirt) Junior; Setters: 1 Jaden Glenn - (redshirt) Sophomore; 13 Greg Baglio - (redshirt) Freshman; 16 Connor Dunn - Senior; 18 Jack Walmer - (redshirt) Sophomore

== Schedule ==
TV/Internet Streaming/Radio information:

ESPN+ will carry most home and all conference road games. All other road broadcasts will be carried by the schools respective streaming partner.

Date Time	Opponent	Rank	Arena City (Tournament)	Television	Score	Attendance	Record (Big West Record)
1/05; 3 p.m.	#10 USC	#7	Robertson Gymnasium; Santa Barbara, CA (UCSB Asics Invitational)	Vimeo	W 3–1 (19–25, 25–16, 25–18, 25–23)	542	1–0
1/06; 5:30 p.m.	Lincoln Memorial	#7	Robertson Gymnasium; Santa Barbara, CA (UCSB Asics Invitational)		L 2–3 (23–25, 25–21, 22–25, 25–17, 12–15)	234	1–1
1/08; 8 p.m.	#2 UCLA	#7	Robertson Gymnasium; Santa Barbara, CA	ESPN+	L 0–3 (24–26, 16–25, 14–25)	422	1–2
1/13; 7 p.m.	@ #8 Stanford	#10	Burnham Pavilion & Ford Center; Stanford, CA	P12+ STAN	L 0–3 (16–25, 24–26, 18–25)	596	1-3
1/14; 5 p.m.	@ #8 Stanford	#10	Burnham Pavilion & Ford Center; Stanford, CA	P12+ STAN	L 2–3 (25-20, 22–25, 26–24, 24-26, 12-15)	585	1-4
1/19; 7 p.m.	@ #10 USC	#12	Galen Center; Los Angeles, CA	P12+ USC	L 2–3 (25-21, 22–25, 22–25, 25-18, 12-15)	1,508	1-5
1/20; 7 p.m.	@ #2 UCLA	#12	Pauley Pavilion; Los Angeles, CA	P12+ UCLA	L 0–3 (30-32, 17-25, 21-25)	950	1-6
2/01; 7 p.m.	@ #5 Pepperdine	#15	Firestone Fieldhouse; Malibu, CA	WavesCast	L 0–3 (23-25, 21-25, 21-25)	372	1-7
2/03; 7 p.m.	#5 Pepperdine	#15	Robertson Gymnasium; Santa Barbara, CA	ESPN+	W 3-2 (21-25, 25-21, 16-25, 25-11, 15-12)	312	2-7
2/10; 5 p.m.	@ #10 BYU	#14	Smith Fieldhouse; Provo, UT	BYUtv	L 1–3 (25-22, 19-25, 23-25, 20-25)	3,516	2-8
2/11; 5 p.m.	@ #10 BYU	#14	Smith Fieldhouse; Provo, UT	BYUtv	L 1–3 (19-25, 20-25, 25-19, 17-25)	3,785	2-9
3/01; 7 p.m.	Vanguard		Robertson Gymnasium; Santa Barbara, CA	ESPN+	W 3-1 (23-25, 25-23, 25-23, 25-20)	114	3-9
3/03; 7 p.m.	UC San Diego*		Robertson Gymnasium; Santa Barbara, CA	ESPN+	W 3-1 (20-25, 25-22, 28-26, 25-22)	403	4-9 (1-0)
3/10; 7 p.m.	Long Beach State*		Robertson Gymnasium; Santa Barbara, CA	ESPN+	L 1-3 (25-23, 20-25, 16-25, 23-25)	312	4-10 (1-1)
3/11; 7 p.m.	@ Long Beach State*		Walter Pyramid; Long Beach, CA	ESPN+	L 2-3 (25-21, 18-25, 20-25, 25-22, 11-15)	1,745	4-11 (1-2)
3/14; 7 p.m.	Harvard		Robertson Gymnasium; Santa Barbara, CA	ESPN+	W 3-0 (25-21, 25-18, 25-18)	130	5-11
3/16; 7 p.m.	#6 UC Irvine*		Robertson Gymnasium; Santa Barbara, CA	ESPN+	L 2-3 (25-23, 25-22, 15-25, 11-25, 11-15)	312	5-12 (1-3)
3/17; 7 p.m.	@ #6 UC Irvine*		Bren Events Center; Irvine, CA	ESPN+	L 0-3 (23-25, 22-25, 20-25)	790	5-13 (1-4)
3/31; 7 p.m.	#1 Hawai'i*		Robertson Gymnasium; Santa Barbara, CA	ESPN+	L 0-3 (22-25, 21-25, 27-29)	542	5-14 (1-5)
4/01; 7 p.m.	#1 Hawai'i*		Robertson Gymnasium; Santa Barbara, CA	ESPN+	L 0-3 (19-25, 21-25, 27-29)	634	5-15 (1-6)
4/07; 7 p.m.	@ UC San Diego*		LionTree Arena; La Jolla, CA	ESPN+	L 2-3 (20-25, 25-20, 25-19, 14-25, 13-15)	851	5-16 (1-7)
4/14; 7 p.m.	@ #14 CSUN*		Premier America Credit Union Arena; Northridge, CA	ESPN+	W 3-0 (25-20, 25-22, 25-22)	289	6-16 (2-7)
4/15; 7 p.m.	#14 CSUN		Robertson Gymnasium; Santa Barbara, CA	ESPN+	W 3-1 (25-18, 27-25, 21-25, 25-21)	325	7-16 (3-7)
4/20; 5 p.m.	UC San Diego^{(5)}	^{(4)}	Bren Events Center; Irvine, CA (Big West Quarterfinal)	ESPN+	W 3-2 (25-18, 23-25, 25-21, 20-25, 15-12)	1	8-16
4/21; 5 p.m.	#1 Hawai'i^{(1)}	^{(4)}	Bren Events Center; Irvine, CA (Big West Semifinal)	ESPN+	L 0-3 (18-25, 19-25, 18-25)	1	8-17

*-Indicates conference match.
Times listed are Pacific Time Zone.

== Announcers for televised games ==
- USC: Max Kelton & Katie Spieler
- UCLA: Max Kelton & Katie Spieler
- Stanford: Troy Clardy
- Stanford: Ted Enberg
- USC: Max Kelton & Cameron Greene
- UCLA:
- Pepperdine:
- Pepperdine:
- BYU:
- BYU:
- Vanguard:
- UC San Diego:
- Long Beach State:
- Long Beach State:
- Harvard:
- UC Irvine:
- UC Irvine:
- Hawai'i:
- Hawai'i:
- UC San Diego:
- CSUN:
- CSUN:
- Big West Tournament:

== Rankings ==
Ranking movements Legend: ██ Increase in ranking ██ Decrease in ranking RV = Received votes
	Week																	
Poll	Pre	1	2	3	4	5	6	7	8	9	10	11	12	13	14	15	16	Final
AVCA Coaches	7	10	12	14	15	14	RV									RV	RV	RV
Off the Block Media	Not released		RV															

^The Media did not release a Pre-season poll.
