= 2023 Hawaii Rainbow Warriors volleyball team =

American college volleyball season

2023 Hawaii Rainbow Warriors volleyball

Big West Regular Season Co-Champions Big West Tournament Champions

NCAA Tournament, Runner-Up
- Conference: Big West Conference
- Record: 29–3 (9–1 Big West)
- Head coach: Charlie Wade (14th season)
- Associate head coach: Milan Zarkovic (10th season)
- Assistant coach: Kupono Fey (1st season)
- Home stadium: Stan Sheriff Center

The 2023 Hawai'i Rainbow Warriors volleyball team represented the University of Hawaiʻi at Mānoa (UH) in the 2023 NCAA Division I & II men's volleyball season. The Rainbow Warriors, led by 14th-year head coach Charlie Wade, played home games at Stan Sheriff Center on the UH campus in the Honolulu neighborhood of Mānoa. The Rainbow Warriors, members of the Big West Conference, were picked by Big West coaches to win the conference in its preseason poll with Long Beach State. The Rainbow Warriors enter the season as the two-time defending national champions after defeating Long Beach State in the 2022 national championship game. The national championship was Hawai'i's second men's volleyball national championship after they had to vacate the 2002 national championship.

2023 Big West Conference men's volleyball standings
	Conf.				Overall
Team	W		L	PCT	W		L	PCT
No. 2 Hawaii ‍†‍‡‍^{y}	9	–	1	.900	29	–	3	.906
No. 4 Long Beach State ‍†‍‍^{y}	9	–	1	.900	21	–	5	.808
No. 5 UC Irvine ‍‍‍	6	–	4	.600	18	–	11	.621
UC Santa Barbara ‍‍‍	3	–	7	.300	8	–	17	.320
UC San Diego ‍‍‍	2	–	8	.200	8	–	17	.320
Cal State Northridge ‍‍‍	1	–	9	.100	12	–	16	.429
† – Conference champion ‡ – Big West tournament champion y – Invited to the NCAA tournament Rankings from AVCA

== Preseason ==
Both the preseason All-Big West team, and the Big West Coaches' Poll were released on December 21, 2022. Hawaii was picked to finish first in the Big West Conference and had three players make the preseason team.

=== Big West Coaches' Poll ===
Coaches' Poll
Pos.	Team	Points
1	Hawai'i	25 (5)
1	Long Beach State	19
3	UC Irvine	17 (1)
4	UC Santa Barbara	13
5	CSUN	10
6	UC San Diego	6

Preseason All-Big West Team
Player	No.	Position	Class
Jakob Thelle	10	Setter	Senior
Dimitrios Mouchlias	11	Outside/Opp. Hitter	Junior
Spyros Chakas	23	Outside/Opp. Hitter	Junior

== Roster ==
2026 Hawaii Rainbow Warriors Roster
Defensive Specialist/Libero: 4 Brett Sheward - Junior; 5 'Eleu Choy - (redshirt) Freshman; 15 Kai Taylor - Freshman; Middle Blockers: 7 Cole Hogland - Junior; 8 Kurt Nusterer - (redshirt) Freshman; 14 Alaka'i Todd - Junior; 19 Alex Parks - Freshman; 21 Guilherme Voss - Junior	Outside Hitters: 1 Chaz Galloway - Junior; 2 Derek Bradford - Freshman; 6 Makua Marumoto - Sophomore; 9 Devon Johnson - Junior; 15 Kai Taylor - Freshman; 16 Filip Humler - Senior; 18 Cole Ottmar - (redshirt) Freshman; 20 Keoni Thiim - Junior; 23 Spyros Chakas - Junior; 25 Kana'i Akana - Senior	Opposite Hitters: 7 Cole Hogland - Junior; 11 Dimitrios Mouchlias - Junior; 14 Alaka'i Todd - Junior; 16 Filip Humler - Senior; 23 Spyros Chakas - Junior; Setters: 3 Josh Friedman - Sophomore; 4 Brett Sheward - Junior; 10 Jakob Thelle - Senior; 12 Austin Buchanan - Sophomore

=== Coaches ===
2024 Hawaii Rainbow Warriors Coaching Staff
- Charlie Wade – head coach – 14th year
- Milan Zarkovic – associate head coach – 10th year
- Kupono Fey - assistant coach - 1st year
- Chad Giesseman – volunteer coach –

== Schedule ==
TV/Internet Streaming information:

All home games will be televised on Spectrum Sports. All conference road games will be streamed on ESPN+ or the respective schools streaming service.

Date Time	Streaming/Radio	Opponent	Rank	Stadium	Score	Sets	Attendance	Overall	BWC
1/12; 7 p.m.	SPEC	#6 Ball State	#1	Stan Sheriff Center; Honolulu, HI	W, 3–1	(25–16, 25–23, 22–25, 25–17)	5,581	1-0	—
1/13; 7 p.m.	SPEC	#6 Ball State	#1	Stan Sheriff Center; Honolulu, HI	W 3–1	(23–25, 25–23, 25–18, 25–18)	6,646	2-0	—
1/18; 7 p.m.	SPEC	St. Francis	#1	Stan Sheriff Center; Honolulu, HI	W 3–0	(25–16, 25–18, 25–23)	4,514	3-0	—
1/20; 7 p.m.	SPEC	St. Francis	#1	Stan Sheriff Center; Honolulu, HI	W 3–0	(25–21, 25–20, 25–20)	5,427	4-0	
1/25; 2 p.m.	YouTube	@ Queens	#1	Curry Arena at the Levine Center; Charlotte, NC	W 3–0	(25–20, 25–21, 25–17)	455	5-0	
1/26; 2 p.m.	Conference Carolinas DN	@ Belmont Abbey	#1	Wheeler Center; Belmont, NC	W 3–0	(25–18, 25–18, 25–21)	1,154	6-0	
1/28; 2:30 p.m.	Conference Carolinas DN	@ Barton	#1	Wilson Gymnasium; Wilson, NC	W 3–0	(25–11, 25–19, 25–14)	795	7-0	
2/10; 5 p.m.	P12+ STAN	@ #8 Stanford	#1	Burnham Pavilion & Ford Center; Stanford, CA	W 3–0	(25–22, 25–19, 26–24)	1,703	8-0	
2/11; 4 p.m.	P12+ STAN	@ #8 Stanford	#1	Burnham Pavilion & Ford Center; Stanford, CA	W 3–0	(27–25, 25–19, 25–19)	1,336	9-0	
2/16; 7 p.m.	SPEC	Concordia Irvine	#1	Stan Sheriff Center; Honolulu, HI	W 3–1	(25–14, 22–25, 25–15, 25–23)	4,920	10-0	
2/17; 7 p.m.	SPEC	Concordia Irvine	#1	Stan Sheriff Center; Honolulu, HI	W 3-0	(25–20, 25–19, 25–19)	5,381	11-0	
2/22; 7 p.m.	SPEC	LIU	#1	Stan Sheriff Center; Honolulu, HI	W 3-0	(25–13, 25–13, 25–18)	4,371	12-0	
2/24; 7 p.m.	SPEC	LIU	#1	Stan Sheriff Center; Honolulu, HI	W 3-0	(25–18, 25–13, 25–16)	5,245	13-0	
3/01; 7 p.m.	SPEC	#7 Pepperdine	#1	Stan Sheriff Center; Honolulu, HI	W 3-1	(25–15, 22–25, 25–22, 25–21)	5,059	14-0	
3/03; 7 p.m.	SPEC	#7 Pepperdine	#1	Stan Sheriff Center; Honolulu, HI	W 3-0	(25–19, 25–18, 25–21)	7,452	15-0	
OUTRIGGER Volleyball Invitational
3/09; 7 p.m.	SPEC	Purdue Fort Wayne	#1	Stan Sheriff Center; Honolulu, HI	W 3-0	(27–25, 25–13, 25–20)	4,696	16-0	
3/10; 7 p.m.	SPEC	#3 Penn State	#1	Stan Sheriff Center; Honolulu, HI	L 1-3	(25–21, 23–25, 21–25, 23–25)	6,557	16-1	
3/11; 7 p.m.	SPEC	#2 UCLA	#1	Stan Sheriff Center; Honolulu, HI	W 3-1	(29–27, 21–25, 25–22, 28–26)	10,300	17-1	
Big West Conference Play
3/17; 7 p.m.	SPEC	#4 Long Beach State*	#1	Stan Sheriff Center; Honolulu, HI	L 0-3	(20–25, 27–29, 22–25)	7,527	17-2 (0–1)	
3/18; 7 p.m.	SPEC	#4 Long Beach State*	#1	Stan Sheriff Center; Honolulu, HI	W 3-0 (25–16, 25–23, 25–23)	(25–16, 25–23, 25–23)	9,579	18-2 (1-1)	
3/24; 4 p.m.	ESPN+	@ #14 CSUN*	#2	Premier America Credit Union Arena; Northridge, CA	W 3-0	(25–22, 25–14, 25–18)	513	19-2 (2–1)	
3/25; 4 p.m.	ESPN+	@ #14 CSUN*	#2	Premier America Credit Union Arena; Northridge, CA	W 3-0	(25–17, 25–18, 25–15)	522	20-2 (3–1)	
3/31; 4 p.m.	ESPN+	@ UC Santa Barbara*	#1	Robertson Gymnasium; Santa Barbara, CA	W 3-0	(25–22, 25–21, 29–27)	542	21-2 (4–1)	
4/01; 4 p.m.	ESPN+	@ UC Santa Barbara*	#1	Robertson Gymnasium; Santa Barbara, CA	W 3-0	(25–19, 25–21, 29–27)	634	22-2 (5–1)	
4/07; 7 p.m.	SPEC	#5 UC Irvine*	#1	Stan Sheriff Center; Honolulu, HI	W 3-1	(25–16, 17–25, 25–23, 25–22)	7,399	23-2 (6–1)	
4/08; 7 p.m.	SPEC	#5 UC Irvine*	#1	Stan Sheriff Center; Honolulu, HI	W 3-0	(26–24, 25–20, 25–19)	8,409	24-2 (7–1)	
4/14; 7 p.m.	SPEC	UC San Diego*	#1	Stan Sheriff Center; Honolulu, HI	W 3-1	(28–26, 25–17, 19–25, 25–14)	7,022	25-2 (8–1)	
4/15; 7 p.m.	SPEC	UC San Diego*	#1	Stan Sheriff Center; Honolulu, HI	W 3-0	(25–19, 25–22, 25–21)	10,300	26-2 (9–1)	
OUTRIGGER Big West Championship presented by the Hawaiian Islands									
4/21; 2 p.m.	ESPN+	UC Santa Barbara^{(4)}	#1^{(1)}	Bren Events Center; Irvine, CA (Big West Semifinal)	W 3-0	(25–18, 25–19, 25–18)	1	27-2	
4/22; 4 p.m.	ESPNU	@ #5 UC Irvine^{(3)}	#1^{(1)}	Bren Events Center; Irvine, CA (Big West Championship)	W 3-1	(25–18, 21–25, 25–13, 25–22)	4,064	28-2	
NCAA Men's Volleyball Championship
5/4; 1:30 p.m.	NCAA.com	#3 Penn State	#1 ^{(2)}	EagleBank Arena; Fairfax, VA (NCAA Semifinal)	W 3–2	(25–20, 25–23, 16–25, 23–25, 15–10)	3,782	29-2	
5/6; 11 a.m.	ESPN2	#2 UCLA ^{(1)}	#1 ^{(2)}	EagleBank Arena; Fairfax, VA (NCAA Championship)	L 1-3 (26–28, 33–31, 21–25, 21–25)	(26–28, 33–31, 21–25, 21–25)	6,942	29-3	

== Rankings ==
Ranking movements Legend: ██ Increase in ranking ██ Decrease in ranking
	Week																	
Poll	Pre	1	2	3	4	5	6	7	8	9	10	11	12	13	14	15	16	Final
AVCA Coaches	1	1	1	1	1	1	1	1	1	1	1	2	1	1	1	1	1	2
Off the Block Media	Not released		1	1	1	1	1	1	1	1	2	3	2	2	2	2		2

^The Media did not release a Pre-season or Week 1 poll.
