= 2023 Big West Conference men's volleyball tournament =

2023 Big West Conference Men's Volleyball Tournament
- Classification: Division I/II
- Teams: 6
- Site: Bren Events Center; Irvine, California
- Champions: Hawai'i (3rd title)
- Winning coach: Charlie Wade (3rd title)
- MVP: Jakob Thelle (Hawai'i)
- Attendance: 4,064
- Television: ESPN+ & ESPNU
- Big West Conference Men's Volleyball Tournaments

2023 Big West Conference men's volleyball standings
	Conf.				Overall
Team	W		L	PCT	W		L	PCT
No. 2 Hawaii ‍†‍‡‍^{y}	9	–	1	.900	29	–	3	.906
No. 4 Long Beach State ‍†‍‍^{y}	9	–	1	.900	21	–	5	.808
No. 5 UC Irvine ‍‍‍	6	–	4	.600	18	–	11	.621
UC Santa Barbara ‍‍‍	3	–	7	.300	8	–	17	.320
UC San Diego ‍‍‍	2	–	8	.200	8	–	17	.320
Cal State Northridge ‍‍‍	1	–	9	.100	12	–	16	.429
† – Conference champion ‡ – Big West tournament champion y – Invited to the NCAA tournament Rankings from AVCA

The 2023 Big West Conference men's volleyball tournament is a postseason men's volleyball tournament for the Big West Conference during the 2023 NCAA Division I & II men's volleyball season. It was held April 20 through April 22, 2023 at the Bren Events Center in Irvine, California. The winner received the conference's automatic bid to the 2023 NCAA Volleyball Tournament.

== Seeds ==
All six teams were eligible for the postseason, with the top two seeds receiving byes to the semifinals. Teams were seeded by record within the conference, with a tiebreaker system to seed teams with identical conference records.

Seed	School	Conference	Tiebreaker
1	Hawai'i	9-1	1–1 vs. LBSU, points vs. LBSU won 144 to 141
2	Long Beach State	9-1	1-1 vs. Hawaii, point vs. Hawaii lost 141 to 144
3	UC Irvine	6–4	–
4	UC Santa Barbara	3–7	–
5	UC San Diego	2–8	–
6	CSUN	1–9	–

== Schedule and results ==
The 1st Round and Semifinal matches were televised on Spectrum Hawai'i and simulcast on ESPN+. The final was broadcast on ESPNU.

Time Network	Matchup	Score	Attendance	Broadcasters
Quarterfinals – Thursday, April 20
5:00 pm ESPN+	No. 4 UCSB vs. No. 5 UC San Diego	3-2 (25-1,8, 23–25, 15–21, 20–25, 15–12)	1,008	Kanoa Leahey & Chris McLachlin
7:30 pm^ ESPN+	No. 3 UC Irvine vs. No. 6 CSUN	3-0 (25-21, 25–22, 25–18)	1,008	Kanoa Leahey & Chris McLachlin
Semifinals – Friday, April 21
5:00 pm ESPN+	No. 1 Hawai'i vs. No. 4 UCSB	3-0 (25-18, 25–19, 25–18)	2,543	Kanoa Leahey & Chris McLachlin
7:30 pm ESPN+	No. 2 Long Beach State vs. No. 3 UC Irvine	0-3 (21-25, 17–25, 20–25)	2,543	Kanoa Leahey & Chris McLachlin
Championship – Saturday, April 22
7:00 pm ESPNU	No. 1 Hawai'i vs. No. 3 UC Irvine	3-1 (25-18, 21–25, 25–13, 25–22)	4,064	Paul Sunderland & Kevin Barnett
Game times are PT. Rankings denote tournament seeding.

^ delay start at 8:21 pm

== Bracket ==
Quarterfinals; Thursday, April 20
4	UC Santa Barbara	3
5	UC San Diego	2
3	UC Irvine	3
6	CSUN	0

Semifinals; Friday, April 21
1	Hawai'i	3
4	UC Santa Barbara	0
2	Long Beach State	0
3	UC Irvine	3

Championship; Saturday, April 22
1	Hawai'i	3
3	UC Irvine	1
