= 2023 Daemen Wildcats men's volleyball team =

American college volleyball season

2023 Daemen Wildcats men's volleyball
- Conference: Northeast Conference
- Record: 17-6 (11-3 NEC)
- Head coach: Don Gleason (4th season)
- Assistant coach: Darek Przybyl (4th season)
- Home arena: Charles L. & Gloria B. Lumsden Gymnasium

The 2023 Daemen Wildcats men's volleyball team represented Daemen University in the 2023 NCAA Division I & II men's volleyball season. The Wildcats, led by fourth year head coach Don Gleason, played their home games at Charles L. & Gloria B. Lumsden Gymnasium. The Wildcats competed as a member of the newly created Northeast Conference men's volleyball conference and were picked to finish fourth in the NEC.

2023 Northeast Conference men's volleyball standings
	Conf.				Overall
Team	W		L	PCT	W		L	PCT
St. Francis ‍†‍‍	12	–	2	.857	16	–	12	.571
Daemen ‍‍‍	11	–	3	.786	17	–	7	.708
LIU ‍‍‡‍	10	–	4	.714	19	–	11	.633
Sacred Heart ‍‍‍	7	–	7	.500	12	–	13	.480
St. Francis Brooklyn ‍‍‍	5	–	9	.357	10	–	16	.385
Merrimack ‍‍‍	4	–	10	.286	10	–	16	.385
Fairleigh Dickinson ‍‍‍	4	–	10	.286	7	–	17	.292
D'Youville ‍‍‍	3	–	11	.214	10	–	13	.435
† – Conference champion ‡ – 2023 Northeast Tournament champion: y- Invited to the NCAA volleyball tournament As of March 27, 2025 Rankings from AVCA

== Roster ==
2023 Daemen Wildcats roster
Defensive specialist/libero: 1 Kyle Zelasko - Freshman; 15 John Jaworski - Senior; Middle hitters: 9 Jake Couzens - Senior; 10 Maverick O'Neill - Sophomore; 12 Henry Moffitt - Graduate	Outside hitters: 2 Johnaustin Bly - Freshman; 4 Cameron Milligan - Junior; 5 Jake Basinski - Sophomore; 7 Ryan Parker - Senior; 13 Zach Schneider - Senior; 16 Matthew Garry - Senior; 18 Billy Wieberg - Sophomore	Opposite hitters: 4 Cameron Milligan - Junior; 9 Jake Couzens - Senior; 17 Ashton Christensen - Freshman; Setters: 3 Michael Krueger - Graduate; 6 Sean Califf - Senior

== Schedule ==
TV/Internet Streaming information:

All home games will be streamed on NEC Front Row. Most road games will be streamed by the schools streaming service, including NEC Front Row.

Date time	Opponent	Rank	Arena city (tournament)	Television	Score	Attendance	Record
1/10; 7 p.m.	Princeton		Charles L. & Gloria B. Lumsden Gymnasium; Amhest, NY	NEC Front Row	W 3–1 (25–27, 25–19, 25–16, 25–22)	375	1–0
1/13; 7 p.m.	@ #4 Penn State		Rec Hall; University Park, PA	B1G+	L 0-3 (10-25, 19–25, 22–25)	357	1-1
1/21; 1 p.m.	American International		Charles L. & Gloria B. Lumsden Gymnasium; Amherst, NY	NEC Front Row	W 3–0 (25–17, 25–12, 25–21)	153	2-1
1/28; 1 p.m.	Central State		Charles L. & Gloria B. Lumsden Gymnasium; Amherst, NY	NEC Front Row	W 3–0 (25–15, 25–17, 25–17)	150	3-1
1/29; 2 p.m.	@ St. John Fisher (Exhibition)		Manning & Napier Varsity Gym; Pittsford, NY	Cardinals All-Access on Stretch	W 3–2 (16-25, 25–22, 25–18, 27-29, 15-6)	117	3-1
2/03; 7 p.m.	@ Harvard		Malkin Athletic Center; Cambridge, MA	ESPN+	W 3–1 (25-15, 19-25, 25-17, 37-35)	151	4-1
2/04; 7 p.m.	@ American International		Henry A. Butova Gymnasium; Springfield, MA	AIC Stretch	W 3–0 (25-6, 25-15, 25-15)	79	5-1
2/10; 7 p.m.	@ D'Youville*		College Center Gymnasium; Buffalo, NY	ECC SN	W 3–0 (25-18, 25-21, 25-14)	225	6-1 (1-0)
2/17; 7 p.m.	@ Merrimack*		Hammel Court; North Andover, MA	NEC Front Row	W 3–2 (25-18, 21-25, 25-21, 21-25, 15-11)	188	7-1 (2-0)
2/19; 12 p.m.	@ Sacred Heart*		William H. Pitt Center; Fairfield, CT	NEC Front Row	W 3–2 (25-13, 24-26, 28-30, 25-21, 15-11)	147	8-1 (3-0)
2/23; 6 p.m.	D'Youville*		Charles L. & Gloria B. Lumsden Gymnasium; Amherst, NY	NEC Front Row	W 3–1 (25-13, 25-13, 21-25, 25-19)	180	9-1 (4-0)
2/26; 12 p.m.	St. Francis Brooklyn*		Charles L. & Gloria B. Lumsden Gymnasium; Amherst, NY	NEC Front Row	W 3–0 (25-19, 25-18, 25-17)	145	10-1 (5-0)
3/04; 1 p.m.	Alderson Broaddus		Charles L. & Gloria B. Lumsden Gymnasium; Amherst, NY	NEC Front Row	Canceled		
3/09; 6 p.m.	@ LIU*		Charles L. & Gloria B. Lumsden Gymnasium; Amherst, NY	NEC Front Row	W 3–0 (25-23, 25-22, 25-21)	240	11-1 (6-0)
3/15; 10 p.m.	@ Concordia Irvine		CU Arena; Irvine, CA	EagleEye	L 0-3 (19-25, 19-25, 22-25)	182	11-2
3/17; 9 p.m.	@ #7 Pepperdine		Firestone Fieldhouse; Malibu, CA	WavesCast	L 0-3 (13-25, 18-25, 17-25)	379	11-3
3/18; 10 p.m.	@ #12 CSUN		Matadome; Northridge, CA	ESPN+	W 3-2 (25-19, 25-21, 19-25, 22-25, 15-12)	144	12-3
3/24; 6 p.m.	Fairleigh Dickinson*		Charles L. & Gloria B. Lumsden Gymnasium; Amherst, NY	NEC Front Row	W 3-0 (25-15, 25-13, 25-22)	75	13-3 (7-0)
3/25; 1 p.m.	St. Francis*		Charles L. & Gloria B. Lumsden Gymnasium; Amherst, NY	NEC Front Row	L 2-3 (24-26, 25-19, 24-26, 25-18, 15-17)	215	13-4 (7-1)
3/31; 7 p.m.	@ LIU*		Steinberg Wellness Center; Brooklyn, NY	NEC Front Row	W 3-2 (23-25, 26-24, 22-25, 26-24, 15-10)	109	14-4 (8-1)
4/01; TBA	@ St. Francis Brooklyn*		Generoso Pope Athletic Complex; Brooklyn, NY	NEC Front Row	W 3-2 (23-25, 34-32, 25-19, 28-30, 15-12)	75	15-4 (9-1)
4/07; 6 p.m.	Sacred Heart*		Charles L. & Gloria B. Lumsden Gymnasium; Amherst, NY	NEC Front Row	W 3-1 (25-18, 24-26, 25-12, 25-22)	176	16-4 (10-1)
4/08; 1 p.m.	Merrimack*		Charles L. & Gloria B. Lumsden Gymnasium; Amherst, NY	NEC Front Row	W 3-0 (25-20, 25-18, 25-16)	100	17-4 (11-1)
4/14; 5 p.m.	@ Fairleigh Dickinson*		Rothman Center; Hackensack, NJ	NEC Front Row	L 1-3 (18-25, 14-25, 25-23, 20-25)	54	17-5 (11-2)
4/15; 5 p.m.	@ St. Francis*		DeGol Arena; Loretto, PA	NEC Front Row	L 1-3 (20-25, 28-26, 17-25, 19-25)	0	17-6 (11-3)

*-Indicates conference match.
Times listed are Eastern Time Zone.

== Rankings ==
Ranking movements Legend: RV = Received votes
	Week																	
Poll	Pre	1	2	3	4	5	6	7	8	9	10	11	12	13	14	15	16	Final
AVCA Coaches												RV			RV			
Off the Block Media	Not released									RV								

^The Media did not release a Pre-season or Week 1 poll.
