= 2023 St. Francis Brooklyn Terriers men's volleyball team =

American college volleyball season

2023 St. Francis Brooklyn Terriers men's volleyball
- Conference: Northeast Conference
- Record: 10-15 (5-9 NEC)
- Head coach: Justin Beaumont (1st season)
- Assistant coaches: Jazmine Craig (1st season); Ryan Kenny (1st season)
- Home arena: Generoso Pope Athletic Complex

The 2023 St. Francis Brooklyn Terriers men's volleyball team represented St. Francis College (SFC) in the 2023 NCAA Division I & II men's volleyball season. The Terriers, led by first-year head coach Justin Beaumont, played their home games at Generoso Pope Athletic Complex. The Terriers competed as a member of the newly created Northeast Conference men's volleyball conference. The Terriers were picked to finish second in the NEC pre-season poll.

This was the final season for SFC men's volleyball, and for SFC athletics as a whole. During the season, the college announced it would shut down its athletic program at the end of the 2022–23 school year.

2023 Northeast Conference men's volleyball standings
	Conf.				Overall
Team	W		L	PCT	W		L	PCT
Saint Francis ‍†‍‍	12	–	2	.857	16	–	12	.571
Daemen ‍‍‍	11	–	3	.786	17	–	7	.708
LIU ‍‍‡‍	10	–	4	.714	19	–	11	.633
Sacred Heart ‍‍‍	7	–	7	.500	12	–	13	.480
St. Francis Brooklyn ‍‍‍	5	–	9	.357	10	–	16	.385
Merrimack ‍‍‍	4	–	10	.286	10	–	16	.385
Fairleigh Dickinson ‍‍‍	4	–	10	.286	7	–	17	.292
D'Youville ‍‍‍	3	–	11	.214	10	–	13	.435
† – Conference champion ‡ – Northeast tournament champion

== Season highlights ==
- Nicola Iannelli won the National Setter of the Week award for Week 0 games.

== Roster ==
2023 St. Francis Brooklyn Terriers roster
Defensive specialist/libero: 12 Dominick Pikura - Senior; 15 Tanner Dougherty - Freshman; Middle blockers: 10 James Henneberry - Senior; 14 Andrea Lancianese - Sophomore; 20 Simon Luka Vlahovic - Freshman; 21 Juan Marin Luna - Junior	Outside hitters: 3 Jack Hershman - Sophomore; 4 Patrick Rogers - Freshman; 8 Canyon Tuman - Graduate; 11 Timothy Walsh - Senior; 16 Bartek Zielinski - Senior; 18 Matteo Falleri - Freshman; 23 Nicola Iannelli - Senior; 32 Johnny Ferraro - Senior	Opposite hitters: 13 Daniel Lee - Senior; 18 Matteo Falleri - Freshman; Setters: 1 Lucas Blanco - Junior; 2 Matt Mongin - Junior; 6 Mark Nomerotski - Junior

== Schedule ==
TV/Internet Streaming information:

All home games will be streamed on NEC Front Row. Most road games will be streamed by the schools streaming service.

Date time	Opponent	Rank	Arena city (tournament)	Television	Score	Attendance	Record
1/06; 6:30 p.m.	vs. Alderson Broaddus		Harrah's Resort and Casino; Atlantic City, NJ (JBJ Battle for the Boardwalk)		W 3–0 (25–23, 25–15, 25–20)	125	1–0
1/07; 9 a.m.	vs. Eastern Nazarene		Hannah's Resort and Casino; Atlantic City, NJ (JBJ Battle for the Boardwalk)		W 3–0 (25–17, 25–16, 25–19)	100	2–0
1/07; 4:30 p.m.	vs. American International		Hannah's Resort and Casino; Atlantic City, NJ (JBJ Battle for the Boardwalk)		W 3–0 (25–18, 25–11, 25–17)	100	3–0
1/11; 6 p.m.	@ Springfield		Blake Arena; Springfield, MA	Playsight	L 0–3 (18–25, 22–25, 21–25)	300	3–1
1/21; 2 p.m.	@ NJIT		Wellness and Events Center; Newark, NJ	America East TV	L 1–3 (21–25, 26–24, 25–27, 20-25)	255	3-2
1/27; 8 p.m.	@ #15 Lewis		Neil Carey Arena; Romeoville, IL	GLVC SN	L 0–3 (18–25, 15–25, 19–25)	500	3-3
1/28; 7 p.m.	@ #11 Loyola Chicago		Joseph J. Gentile Arena; Chicago, IL	ESPN3 or ESPN+	L 0–3 (20–25, 14–25, 19–25)	555	3-4
2/11; TBD	@ Princeton		Dillon Gymnasium; Princeton, NJ	ESPN+	L 0–3 (19-25, 16-25, 22-25)	0	3-5
2/18; TBA	Fairleigh Dickinson*		Generoso Pope Athletic Complex; Brooklyn, NY	NEC Front Row	W 3-1 (25-14, 26-28, 25-22, 25-21)	310	4-5 (1-0)
2/25; 5 p.m.	@ D'Youville*		College Center Gymnasium; Buffalo, NY	ECC SN	W 3-0 (25-17, 25-23, 29-27)	95	5-5 (2-0)
2/26; 12 p.m.	@ Daemen*		Charles L. & Gloria B. Lumsden Gymnasium; Amherst, NY	NEC Front Row	L 0-3 (19-25, 18-25, 17-25)	145	5-6 (2-1)
3/03; 6 p.m.	@ Harvard		Malkin Athletic Center; Cambridge, MA	ESPN+	L 2-3 (19-25, 16-25, 25-22, 25-23, 3-15)	342	5-7
3/04; TBA	@ American International		Henry A. Butova Gymnasium; Springfield, MA	AIC Stretch			
3/9; 7 p.m.	@ St. Francis*	W 3-0 (25-19, 25-19, 25-19)	DeGol Arena; Loretta, PA	NEC Front Row		123	6-7 (3-1)
3/14; 7 p.m.	@ LIU*		Steinberg Wellness Center; Brooklyn, NY	NEC Front Row	L 1-3 (27-25, 20-25, 22-25, 20-25)	107	6-8 (3-2)
3/16; 7 p.m.	LIU*		Generoso Pope Athletic Complex; Brooklyn, NY	NEC Front Row	L 2-3 (25-22, 18-25, 14-25, 25-23, 12-15)	216	6-9 (3-3)
3/18; 2 p.m.	vs. Randolph-Macon		Harwood Arena; Union, NJ (Kean Tri-Match)	Kean All-Access	W 3-1 (25-20, 24-26, 25-19, 25-19)	65	7-9
3/18; 4 p.m.	@ Kean		Harwood Arena; Union, NJ (Kean Tri-Match)	Kean All-Access	W 3-0 (25-18, 25-20, 25-14)	121	8-9
3/24; 7 p.m.	@ Sacred Heart*		William H. Pitt Center; Fairfield, CT	NEC Front Row	L 0-3 (31-33, 13-25, 19-25)	127	8-10 (3-4)
3/25; TBA	@ Merrimack*		Hammel Court; North Andover, MA	NEC Front Row	W 3-0 (25-22, 25-22, 25-20)	154	9-10 (4-4)
3/31; TBA	D'Youville*		Generoso Pope Athletic Complex; Brooklyn, NY	NEC Front Row	L 2-3 (25-22, 21-25, 21-25, 25-23, 12-15)	87	9-11 (4-5)
4/01; TBA	Daemen*		Generoso Pope Athletic Complex; Brooklyn, NY	NEC Front Row	L 2-3 (25-23, 32-34, 19-25, 30-28, 12-15)	75	9-12 (4-6)
4/07; TBA	@ St. Francis*		DeGol Arena; Loretto, PA	NEC Front Row	L 0-3 (18-25, 23-25, 20-25)	127	9-13 (4-7)
4/08; TBA	@ Fairleigh Dickinson*		Rothman Center; Hackensack, NJ	NEC Front Row	W 3-1 (18-25, 25-18, 25-21, 25-23)	29	10-13 (5-7)
4/14; TBA	Sacred Heart*		Generoso Pope Athletic Complex; Brooklyn, NY	NEC Front Row	L 1-3 (21-25, 25-20, 21-25, 22-25)	85	10-14 (5-8)
4/15; TBA	Merrimack*		Generoso Pope Athletic Complex; Brooklyn, NY	NEC Front Row	L 1-3 (18-25, 25-15, 20-25, 16-25)	42	10-15 (5-9)

*-Indicates conference match.
Times listed are Eastern Time Zone.

== Rankings ==
Ranking movements Legend: RV = Received votes
	Week																	
Poll	Pre	1	2	3	4	5	6	7	8	9	10	11	12	13	14	15	16	Final
AVCA Coaches																		
Off the Block Media	Not released											RV						

^The Media did not release a Pre-season or Week 1 poll.
