= 2023 LIU Sharks men's volleyball team =

American college volleyball season

2023 LIU Sharks men's volleyball

NEC Tournament Champions
- Conference: Northeast Conference
- Record: 16-11 (10-4 NEC)
- Head coach: Kai Dugquem (1st season)
- Assistant coach: Luke Pope (1st season)
- Home arena: Steinberg Wellness Center

The 2023 LIU Sharks men's volleyball team, the second LIU men's volleyball team, represented Long Island University Brooklyn in the 2023 NCAA Division I & II men's volleyball season. The Sharks, led by first year head coach Kai Dugquem, played their home games at Steinberg Wellness Center. The Sharks competed as a member of the newly created Northeast Conference men's volleyball conference. After winning most of their games at the end of last season, the Sharks were picked to finish third in the NEC.

2023 Northeast Conference men's volleyball standings
	Conf.				Overall
Team	W		L	PCT	W		L	PCT
St. Francis ‍†‍‍	12	–	2	.857	16	–	12	.571
Daemen ‍‍‍	11	–	3	.786	17	–	7	.708
LIU ‍‍‡‍	10	–	4	.714	19	–	11	.633
Sacred Heart ‍‍‍	7	–	7	.500	12	–	13	.480
St. Francis Brooklyn ‍‍‍	5	–	9	.357	10	–	16	.385
Merrimack ‍‍‍	4	–	10	.286	10	–	16	.385
Fairleigh Dickinson ‍‍‍	4	–	10	.286	7	–	17	.292
D'Youville ‍‍‍	3	–	11	.214	10	–	13	.435
† – Conference champion ‡ – 2023 Northeast Tournament champion: y- Invited to the NCAA volleyball tournament As of March 27, 2025 Rankings from AVCA

== Roster ==
2023 LIU Sharks roster
Defensive Specialist/Libero: 7 Danny Seliger - Sophomore; 15 La'iākea'oaloali'ilani Shaun Hirahara - Freshman; 18 Utpal Chand - Junior; Middle Blockers: 19 Eddy Alexandre - Sophomore; 21 Drew McNellis - Freshman; Middle Hitters: 2 Andreas Schuetz - Freshman; Right Side Hitters: 11 Andre Aguilar - Freshman	Outside Hitters: 2 Andreas Schuetz - Freshman; 3 Erik Giezycki - Freshman; 4 Gio Collazo - Sophomore; 6 Peter Gavroff - Freshman; 9 Livan Moreno - Senior; 10 Arthur Sueur - Graduate; 12 Elliott DeForge - Freshman; 14 Gustavo Cavalcanti - Sophomore; 15 La'iākea'oaloali'ilani Shaun Hirahara - Freshman; 16 Jordan Cooper - Senior; 17 Kale Spencer - Freshman; 20 Muhammad Al-Amine Mbaye - Freshman; 21 Drew McNellis - Freshman; 22 Caden Satterfield - Senior	Opposite Hitters: 1 Luke Chandler - Sophomore; Setters: 3 Erik Giezycki - Freshman; 5 Luca Holanda - Sophomore; 8 Kasey Clouet - Sophomore; 11 Andre Aguilar - Freshman; 13 Styles Newcomb - Freshman; 17 Kale Spencer - Freshman

== Schedule ==
TV/Internet Streaming information:

All home games will be streamed on NEC Front Row. Most road games will be streamed by the schools streaming service.

Date Time	Opponent	Rank	Arena City (Tournament)	Television	Score	Attendance	Record
1/10; 7 p.m.	@ Belmont Abbey		Wheeler Center; Belmont, NC	Coastal Carolina DN	W 3–0 (25–20, 25–22, 25–17)	108	1–0
1/11; 7 p.m.	@ Queens		Curry Arena; Charlotte, NC	ESPN+	W 3–1 (20–25, 25–19, 25–20, 25–16)	211	2–0
1/12; 6 p.m.	@ Limestone		Timken Center; Gaffney, SC	FloVolleyball	L 1–3 (25–20, 22–25, 31–33, 21–25)	137	2–1
1/19; 7 p.m.	@ George Mason		Recreation Athletic Complex; Fairfax, VA (East/West Coast Challenge)	ESPN+	W 3–1 (25–22, 25–23, 26–28, 25–19)	187	3-1
1/20; 7 p.m.	vs. #3 Long Beach State		Recreation Athletic Complex; Fairfax, VA (East/West Coast Challenge)		L 0–3 (14-25, 16–25, 10–25)	0	3-2
1/21; 7 p.m.	# 11 Loyola Chicago		Steinberg Wellness Center; Brooklyn, NY	NEC Front Row	L 1–3 (26-24, 21–25, 20–25, 20-25)	176	3-3
2/3; 7 p.m.	@ Lindenwood		Robert F. Hyland Arena; St. Charles, MO	ESPN+	W 3-0 (25-21, 25–22, 25–22)	501	4-3
2/4; 7:30 p.m.	@ McKendree		Melvin Price Convocation Center; Lebanon, IL	GLVC SN	L 0-3 (22-25, 20–25, 24–26)	60	4-4
2/17; 5 p.m.	Fairleigh Dickinson*		Steinberg Wellness Center; Brooklyn, NY	NEC Front Row	W 3-0 (25-19, 25-14, 25-21)	61	5-4 (1-0)
2/18; 7 p.m.	St. Francis*		Steinberg Wellness Center; Brooklyn, NY	NEC Front Row	W 3-2 (25-17, 17-25, 20-25, 25-22, 21-19)	115	6-4 (2-0)
2/22; 7 p.m.	@ #1 Hawai'i		Stan Sheriff Center; Honolulu, HI	SPEC HI; ESPN+	L 0-3 (13-25, 13-25, 18-25)	4,371	6-5
2/24; 7 p.m.	@ #1 Hawai'i		Stan Sheriff Center; Honolulu, HI	SPEC HI; ESPN+	L 0-3 (18-25, 13-25, 16-25)	5,245	6-6
3/03; TBA	@ American International		Henry A. Butova Gymnasium; Springfield, MA	AIC Stretch	W 3-0 (25-15, 25-17, 25-18)	106	7-6
3/04; 5 p.m.	@ Harvard		Malkin Athletic Center; Cambridge, MA	ESPN+	L 1-3 (19-25, 23-25, 25-16, 22-25)	302	7-7
3/08; 6 p.m.	@ D'Youville*		College Center Gymnasium; Buffalo, NY	ECC SN	W 3-1 (23-25, 25-23, 25-18, 25-20)	75	8-7 (3-0)
3/09; 6 p.m.	@ Daemen*		Charles L. & Gloria B. Lumsden Gymnasium; Amherst, NY	NEC Front Row	L 0-3 (23-25, 22-25, 21-25)	240	8-8 (3-1)
3/14; 7 p.m.	St. Francis Brooklyn*		Steinberg Wellness Center; Brooklyn, NY	NEC Front Row	W 3-1 (25-27, 25-20, 25-22, 25-20)	107	9-8 (4-1)
3/16; 7 p.m.	@ St. Francis Brooklyn*		Generoso Pope Athletic Complex; Brooklyn, NY	NEC Front Row	W 3-2 (22-25, 25-18, 25-14, 23-25, 15-12)	216	10-8 (5-1)
3/18; 7 p.m.	American International		Steinberg Wellness Center; Brooklyn, NY	NEC Front Row	'W 3-0 (25-14, 25-18, 25-14)	111	11-8
3/24; 5 p.m.	@ Merrimack*		Hammel Court; North Andover, MA	NEC Front Row	'W 3-1 (25-17, 20-25, 25-22, 25-18)	97	12-8 (6-1)
3/25; TBA	@ Sacred Heart*		William H. Pitt Center; Fairfield, CT	NEC Front Row	'W 3-1 (25-14, 25-22, 25-27, 25-20)	104	13-8 (7-1)
3/31; 5 p.m.	Daemen*		Steinberg Wellness Center; Brooklyn, NY	NEC Front Row	'L 2-3 (25-23, 24-26, 25-22, 24-26, 10-15)	109	13-9 (7-2)
4/01; 7 p.m.	D'Youville*		Steinberg Wellness Center; Brooklyn, NY	NEC Front Row	'W 3-1 (17-25, 25-18, 25-21, 25-18)	90	14-9 (8-2)
4/07; 5 p.m.	@ Fairleigh Dickinson*		Rothman Center; Hackensack, NJ	NEC Front Row	'W 3-1 (25-18, 23-25, 25-14, 28-26)	41	15-9 (9-2)
4/08; TBA	@ St. Francis*		DeGol Arena; Loretto, PA	NEC Front Row	'L 0-3 (18-25, 22-25, 22-25)	167	15-10 (9-3)
4/14; 5 p.m.	Merrimack*		Steinberg Wellness Center; Brooklyn, NY	NEC Front Row	'W 3-0 (25-17, 28-26, 25-17)	154	16-10 (10-3)
4/15; 7 p.m.	Sacred Heart*		Steinberg Wellness Center; Brooklyn, NY	NEC Front Row	'L 2-3 (25-21, 25-27, 23-25, 25-22, 27-29)	187	16-11 (10-4)

*-Indicates conference match.
Times listed are Eastern Time Zone.

== Announcers for televised games ==
- Belmont Abbey: Brian Rushing
- Queens: Mike Glennon & Paul McDonald
- Limestone: Scott Berry & Mike Harmon
- George Mason: Josh Yourish
- Loyola Chicago:
- Lindenwood: Michael Wagenknecht & Sara Wagenknecht
- McKendree:
- Fairleigh Dickinson:
- St. Francis:
- Hawai'i:
- Hawai'i:
- American International:
- Harvard:
- D'Youville:
- Daemen:
- St. Francis Brooklyn:
- St. Francis Brooklyn:
- American International:
- Merrimack:
- Sacred Heart:
- Daemen:
- D'Youville :
- Fairleigh Dickinson:
- St. Francis:
- Merrimack:
- Sacred Heart:

== Rankings ==
Ranking movements Legend: RV = Received votes
	Week																	
Poll	Pre	1	2	3	4	5	6	7	8	9	10	11	12	13	14	15	16	Final
AVCA Coaches																	RV	RV
Off the Block Media	Not released									RV								RV

^The Media did not release a Pre-season or Week 1 poll.
