= 2023 Long Beach State Beach men's volleyball team =

American college volleyball season

2023 Long Beach State Beach men's volleyball
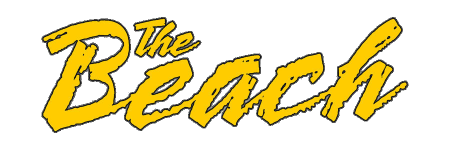

Big West Regular Season Co-Champions

NCAA Tournament, Semifinals
- Conference: Big West Conference
- Record: 21-5 (9–1 Big West)
- Head coach: Alan Knipe (20th season)
- Assistant coaches: Nick MacRae (11th season); McKay Smith (4th season)
- Home arena: Walter Pyramid

2023 Big West Conference men's volleyball standings
	Conf.				Overall
Team	W		L	PCT	W		L	PCT
No. 2 Hawaii ‍†‍‡‍^{y}	9	–	1	.900	29	–	3	.906
No. 4 Long Beach State ‍†‍‍^{y}	9	–	1	.900	21	–	5	.808
No. 5 UC Irvine ‍‍‍	6	–	4	.600	18	–	11	.621
UC Santa Barbara ‍‍‍	3	–	7	.300	8	–	17	.320
UC San Diego ‍‍‍	2	–	8	.200	8	–	17	.320
Cal State Northridge ‍‍‍	1	–	9	.100	12	–	16	.429
† – Conference champion ‡ – Big West tournament champion y – Invited to the NCAA tournament Rankings from AVCA

The 2023 Long Beach State Beach men's volleyball team represented Long Beach State University in the 2023 NCAA Division I & II men's volleyball season. The Beach, led by twentieth year head coach Alan Knipe, played their home games at Walter Pyramid. The Beach competed as members of the Big West Conference and were picked as second in the Big West preseason poll.

== Preseason ==
=== Coaches poll ===
The preseason poll was released on December 21, 2022. Long Beach State was picked to finish second in the Big West Conference standings.

Predicted finish	Team	Votes (1st place)
1	Hawai'i	25 (5)
2	Long Beach State	19
3	UC Irvine	17 (1)
4	UC Santa Barbara	13
5	CSUN	10
6	UC San Diego	6

== Roster ==
2023 Long Beach State Beach roster
Defensive specialist/libero: 3 Mason Briggs - Junior; 22 Caden Jackson - (redshirt) Sophomore; 28 Chris Connelly- Freshman; Middle blockers: 1 Shane Holdaway - Senior; 19 DiAeris McRaven - Sophomore; 20 Aidan Grosz - (redshirt) Junior; 21 Grant Marocchi - Senior; 23 Derek Owens - Junior; 24 Noah Robin - (redshirt) Sophomore; 29 Josh Weyerhaeuser - Freshman	Outside hitters: 2 Sebastian Rodriguez - (redshirt) Sophomore; 4 Skyler Varga - Sophomore; 8 Sotiris Siapanis - Sophomore; 9 Nathan Harlan - Junior; 10 Connor Bloom - (redshirt) Freshman; 12 Clarke Godbold - Junior; 17 Dane Hillis - Sophomore; 27 Calvin Sanborn - Senior; 31 Spencer Olivier - (redshirt) Senior	Opposite hitters: 9 Nathan Harlan - Junior; 10 Connor Bloom - (redshirt) Freshman; 11 Simon Torwie - Junior; 16 Nico Lietz - Freshman; 18 Nato Dickinson - (redshirt) Sophomore; 25 Ryan Peluso - Freshman; 27 Calvin Sanborn - Senior; Setters: 5 Aidan Knipe - ' (redshirt) Junior; 6 Josh Rosenblum - ' (redshirt) Freshman; 13 Island Doty - Freshman; 18 Nato Dickinson - (redshirt) Sophomore; 25 Ryan Peluso - Freshman; 26 Eric Beebe - Junior

== Schedule ==
TV/Internet Streaming/Radio information:

22 West Media will carry select Long Beach State men's volleyball matches on the radio.
ESPN+ will carry most home and all conference road games. All other road broadcasts will be carried by the schools respective streaming partner.

Date time	Opponent	Rank	Arena city (tournament)	Television	Score	Attendance	Record (Big West Record)
1/13; 7:30 p.m.	King	#3	Walter Pyramid; Long Beach, CA		W 3–0 (25-17, 25-12, 25–14)	1,516	1-0
1/14; 7 p.m.	Lindenwood	#3	Walter Pyramid; Long Beach, CA	ESPN+	W 3–0 (25-17, 25-21, 25–17)	1,113	2-0
1/20; 4 p.m.	vs. LIU	#3	Recreation Athletic Complex; Fairfax, VA (East/West Coast Challenge)		W 3–0 (25-14, 25-16, 25–10)	0	3-0
1/21; 4 p.m.	@ George Mason	#3	Recreation Athletic Complex; Fairfax, VA (East/West Coast Challenge)	ESPN+	W 3–0 (25-17, 25-14, 25–16)	586	4-0
1/25; 4 p.m.	@ #4 Penn State	#3	Rec Hall; University Park, PA	B1G+	W 3–1 (18-25, 25-23, 26–24, 27-25)	778	5-0
2/03; 7 p.m.	#12 Loyola Chicago	#3	Walter Pyramid; Long Beach, CA	ESPN+	W 3-2 (23-25, 25-21, 25–19, 23-25, 17-15)	1,598	6-0
2/09; 7 p.m.	@ #4 UCLA	#2	Pauley Pavilion; Los Angeles, CA	P12 LA	L 0-3 (19-25, 21-25, 20-25)	2,245	6-1
2/10; 7 p.m.	#4 UCLA	#2	Walter Pyramid; Long Beach, CA	ESPN+	L 1-3 (25-18, 21-25, 23-25, 23-25)	4,138	6-2
2/17; 7 p.m.	NJIT	#4	Walter Pyramid; Long Beach, CA		W 3-0 (25-15, 25-19, 26-24)	992	7-2
2/18; 7:30 p.m.	NJIT	#4	Walter Pyramid; Long Beach, CA	ESPN+	W 3-0 (25-19, 25-13, 25-13)	1,076	8-2
3/03; 7 p.m.	#12 Ball State	#4	Walter Pyramid; Long Beach, CA	ESPN+	W 3-1 (25-19, 25-17, 21-25, 25-15)	1,318	9-2
3/10; 7 p.m.	@ UC Santa Barbara*	#4	The Thunderdome; Isla Vista, CA	ESPN+	W 3-1 (23-25, 25-20, 25-16, 25-23)	312	10-2 (1-0)
3/11; 7 p.m.	UC Santa Barbara*	#4	Walter Pyramid; Long Beach, CA	ESPN+	W 3-2 (21-25, 25-18, 25-20, 22-25, 15-11)	1,745	11-2 (2-0)
3/17; 10 p.m.	@ #1 Hawai'i*	#4	Stan Sheriff Center; Honolulu, HI	ESPN+	W 3-0 (25-20, 29-27, 25-22)	7,527	12-2 (3-0)
3/18; 10 p.m.	@ #1 Hawai'i*	#4	Stan Sheriff Center; Honolulu, HI	ESPN+	L 0-3 (16-25, 23-25, 23-25)	9,579	12-3 (3-1)
3/24; 7 p.m.	#11 USC	#4	Walter Pyramid; Long Beach, CA	ESPN+	W 3-0 (25-17, 25-15, 25-23)	2,814	13-3
3/25; 7 p.m.	@ #11 USC	#4	Galen Center; Los Angeles, CA	P12+ USC	W 3-1 (25-13, 14-25, 27-25, 25-21)	876	14-3
3/31; 7 p.m.	@ UC San Diego*	#4	LionTree Arena; La Jolla, CA	ESPN+	W 3-0 (25-22, 25-13, 25-16)	760	15-3 (4-1)
4/01; 7 p.m.	UC San Diego*	#4	Walter Pyramid; Long Beach, CA	ESPN+	W 3-0 (25-15, 25-17, 25-13)	1,413	16-3 (5-1)
4/07; 7 p.m.	@ #15 CSUN*	#4	Premier America Credit Union Arena; Northridge, CA	ESPN+	W 3-2 (25-27, 22-25, 25-17, 25-21, 15-9)	696	17-3 (6-1)
4/08; 7 p.m.	#15 CSUN*	#4	Walter Pyramid; Long Beach, CA	ESPN+	W 3-0 (25-19, 25-18, 25-16)	1,634	18-3 (7-1)
4/14; 7 p.m.	#5 UC Irvine*	#4	Walter Pyramid; Long Beach, CA	ESPN+	W 3-0 (25-18, 25-19, 25-22)	2,409	19-3 (8-1)
4/15; 7 p.m.	@ #5 UC Irvine*	#4	Bren Events Center; Irvine, CA	ESPN+	W 3-2 (22-25, 18-25, 25-20, 25-20, 15-13)	1,651	20-3 (9-1)
4/21; 7:30 p.m.	@ #5 UC Irvine^{(3)}	#4^{(2)}	Bren Events Center; Irvine, CA (Big West Tournament Semifinal)	ESPN+	L 0-3 (21-25, 17-25, 20-25)	2,543	20-4
5/2; 2 p.m.	#6 Grand Canyon^{(5)}	#4^{(4)}	EagleBank Arena; Fairfax, VA (NCAA Tournament Quarterfinal)	ESPN+	W 3-1 (22–25, 25–17, 25–22, 25–23)	2,139	21-4
5/4; 2 p.m.	#2 UCLA^{(1)}	#4^{(4)}	EagleBank Arena; Fairfax, VA (NCAA Tournament Semifinal)	NCAA.com	L 0-3 (16–25, 14-25, 19-25)	3,782	21-5

*-Indicates conference match.
()-Indicates tournament seed.
Times listed are Pacific Time Zone.

== Announcers for televised games ==
- Lindenwood: Matt Brown & Tyler Kulakowski
- George Mason:
- Penn State:
- Loyola Chicago:
- UCLA:
- UCLA:
- NJIT:
- NJIT:
- Ball State:
- UC Santa Barbara:
- UC Santa Barbara:
- Hawai'i:
- Hawai'i:
- USC:
- USC:
- UC San Diego:
- UC San Diego:
- CSUN:
- CSUN:
- UC Irvine:
- UC Irvine:

== Rankings ==
Ranking movements Legend: ██ Increase in ranking ██ Decrease in ranking
	Week																	
Poll	Pre	1	2	3	4	5	6	7	8	9	10	11	12	13	14	15	16	Final
AVCA Coaches	3	3	3	3	3	2	4	4	4	4	4	4	4	4	4	4	4	4
Off the Block Media	Not released		3	4	3	2	4	5	4	4	4	4	4	4	4	4		4

^The Media did not release a Pre-season or Week 1 poll.
