= 2023 Saint Francis Red Flash men's volleyball team =

American college volleyball season

2023 Saint Francis Red Flash men's volleyball

NEC regular season champion
- Conference: Northeast Conference
- Record: 15–11 (12–2 NEC)
- Head coach: Mike Rumbaugh (25th season)
- Assistant coach: Scott Gleason (8th season)
- Home arena: DeGol Arena

2023 Northeast Conference men's volleyball standings
	Conf.				Overall
Team	W		L	PCT	W		L	PCT
Saint Francis ‍†‍‍	12	–	2	.857	16	–	12	.571
Daemen ‍‍‍	11	–	3	.786	17	–	7	.708
LIU ‍‍‡‍	10	–	4	.714	19	–	11	.633
Sacred Heart ‍‍‍	7	–	7	.500	12	–	13	.480
St. Francis Brooklyn ‍‍‍	5	–	9	.357	10	–	16	.385
Merrimack ‍‍‍	4	–	10	.286	10	–	16	.385
Fairleigh Dickinson ‍‍‍	4	–	10	.286	7	–	17	.292
D'Youville ‍‍‍	3	–	11	.214	10	–	13	.435
† – Conference champion ‡ – Northeast tournament champion

The 2023 St. Francis Red Flash men's volleyball team represented Saint Francis University in the 2023 NCAA Division I & II men's volleyball season. The Red Flash, led by 25th year head coach Mike Rumbaugh, played their home games at William H. Pitt Center. The Red Flash competed as a member of the newly created Northeast Conference men's volleyball conference. The Red Flash were picked to finish first in the NEC pre-season poll.

== Roster ==
2023 St. Francis Red Flash roster
Defensive specialist/libero: 3 Nicholas Pozzuto - Senior; 11 Matthew Menosky - (redshirt) Junior; 15 Peyton Blain - Junior; 28 Richard Kaminski - Sophomore; Middle blockers: 2 Elijah Lazor - Freshman; 13 Sam Lane - Freshman; 21 Brandon Dunz - Senior; 25 Thomas Leahey - Senior; 26 Devin Voparil - Sophomore	Outside hitters: 4 Michael Mosbacher - Sophomore; 5 Braden Richard - Senior; 6 Blake Liprando - Senior; 7 Alex Finch - (redshirt) Junior; 12 Joey Ferragonio - Junior; 17 Brady Stump - Freshman; 20 Cole Dorn - Freshman; 23 Richard Eber Jr. - (redshirt) Sophomore; 27 Andrew Deardorff - Sophomore	Opposite hitters: 1 Ashton Nahrup - Sophomore; 9 Nathan Zini - Sophomore; 16 Trevor Lewis - Junior; Setters: 8 AJ Schmidt - (redshirt) Senior; 10 Nicholas Lynch - (redshirt) Sophomore; 24 Ryan Parker - Junior; 29 Nathan Hayes - Sophomore

== Schedule ==
TV/Internet Streaming information:

All home games will be streamed on NEC Front Row. Most road games will be streamed by the schools streaming service.

Date time	Opponent	Rank	Arena city (tournament)	Television	Score	Attendance	Record
1/06; 10 p.m.	@ #9 Stanford		Maples Pavilion; Stanford, CA	P12+ STAN	L 1–3 (16–25, 16–25, 25–21, 22–25)	306	0–1
1/07; 7 p.m.	@ #9 Stanford		Maples Pavilion; Stanford, CA	P12+ STAN	L 2–3 (18–25, 25–23, 25–23, 21–25, 13–15)	404	0–2
1/19; 12 a.m.	@ #1 Hawai'i		Stan Sheriff Center; Manoa, HI	ESPN+	L 0–3 (16-25, 18-25, 23-25)	4,514	0-3
1/21; 12 a.m.	@ #1 Hawai'i		Stan Sheriff Center; Manoa, HI	ESPN+	L 0–3 (21-25, 20-25, 20-25)	5,427	0-4
1/27; 4 p.m.	vs. McKendree		Malkin Athletic Center; Cambridge, MA (Harvard Invitational)		L 1–3 (25-18, 16-25, 21-25, 24-26)	78	0-5
1/28; 4 p.m.	vs. North Greenville		Malkin Athletic Center; Cambridge, MA (Harvard Invitational)		L 2–3 (16-25, 25-19, 23-25, 25-19, 14-16)	0	0-6
2/03; 4 p.m.	@ NJIT		Wellness and Events Center; Newark, NJ	America East TV	L 1–3 (19-25, 23-25, 23-25)	222	0-7
2/04; 4 p.m.	Alderson Broaddus		DeGol Arena; Loretto, PA	NEC Front Row	W 3-0 (25-17, 25-21, 25-17)	213	1-7
2/10; 7 p.m.	@ Fairleigh Dickinson*		Rothman Center; Hackensack, NJ	NEC Front Row	W 3-0 (25-22, 25-21, 25-17)	270	2-7 (1-0)
2/11; 7 p.m.	#3 Penn State		DeGol Arena; Loretta, PA	NEC Front Row	L 2-3 (25-22, 25-23, 22-25, 23-25, 10-15)	275	2-8
2/18; 7 p.m.	@ LIU*		Steinberg Wellness Center; Brooklyn, NY	NEC Front Row	L 2-3 (17-25, 25-17, 25-20, 22-25, 19-21)	115	2-9 (1-1)
2/24; 6 p.m.	Sacred Heart*		DeGol Arena; Loretta, PA	NEC Front Row	W 3-0 (25-21, 25-17, 25-18)	0	3-9 (2-1)
2/25; 7 p.m.	Merrimack*		DeGol Arena; Loretta, PA	NEC Front Row	W 3-0 (25-18, 25-21, 25-20)	0	4-9 (3-1)
3/9; 7 p.m.	St. Francis Brooklyn*		DeGol Arena; Loretta, PA	NEC Front Row	L 0-3 (19-25, 19-25, 19-25)	123	4-10 (3-2)
3/10; 7 p.m.	Fairleigh Dickinson*		DeGol Arena; Loretta, PA	NEC Front Row	W 3-0 (25-21, 26-24, 25-20)	146	5-10 (4-2)
3/15; 7 p.m.	@ Queens		Curry Arena at the Levine Center; Charlotte, NC	YouTube	W 3-1 (25-19, 24-26, 26-24, 25-18)	65	6-10
3/16; 4 p.m.	vs. NJIT		Curry Arena at the Levine Center; Charlotte, NC		W 3-1 (28-30, 25-20, 25-14, 25-15)	55	7-10
3/18; 7 p.m.	@ #2 Penn State		Rec Hall; University Park, PA	B1G+	L 0-3 (25-27, 22-25, 14-25)	0	7-11
3/24; 7 p.m.	@ D'Youville*		College Center Gymnasium; Buffalo, NY	ECC SN	W 3-0 (25-15, 25-15, 25-21)	95	8-11 (5-2)
3/25; 4 p.m.	@ Daemen*		Charles L. & Gloria B. Lumsden Gymnasium; Amherst, NY	NEC Front Row	W 3-2 (26-24, 19-25, 26-24, 18-25, 17-15)	215	9-11 (6-2)
3/31; 7 p.m.	@ Sacred Heart*		William H. Pitt Center; Fairfield, CT	NEC Front Row	W 3-0 (25-20, 25-18, 25-13)	213	10-11 (7-2)
4/01; 6 p.m.	@ Merrimack*		Hammel Court; North Andover, MA	NEC Front Row	W 3-1 (25-21, 25-13, 17-25, 25-22)	143	11-11 (8-2)
4/07; 6 p.m.	St. Francis Brooklyn*		DeGol Arena; Loretta, PA	NEC Front Row	W 3-0 (25-18, 25-23, 25-20)	127	12-11 (9-2)
4/08; 4 p.m.	LIU*		DeGol Arena; Loretta, PA	NEC Front Row	W 3-0 (25-18, 25-22, 25-22)	167	13-11 (10-2)
4/14; 6 p.m.	D'Youville*		DeGol Arena; Loretta, PA	NEC Front Row	W 3-0 (25-20, 25-14, 25-12)	186	14-11 (11-2)
4/15; 4 p.m.	Daemen*		DeGol Arena; Loretta, PA	NEC Front Row	W 3-1 (25-20, 26-28, 25-17, 25-19)	0	15-11 (12-2)

*-Indicates conference match.
Times listed are Eastern Time Zone.

== Announcers for televised games ==
- Stanford: Tim Swartz & Troy Clardy
- Stanford: Tim Swartz & Jordan Watkins
- Hawai'i: Kanoa Leahey, Chris McLachlin, & Ryan Tsuji
- Hawai'i:
- NJIT:
- Alderson Broaddus:
- Fairleigh Dickinson:
- Penn State:
- St. Francis Brooklyn:
- LIU:
- Sacred Heart:
- Merrimack:
- Fairleigh Dickinson:
- Queens:
- Penn State:
- D'Youville:
- Daemen:
- Sacred Heart:
- Merrimack:
- St. Francis Brooklyn:
- LIU:
- D'Youville:
- Daemen:

== Rankings ==
Ranking movements Legend: RV = Received votes
	Week																	
Poll	Pre	1	2	3	4	5	6	7	8	9	10	11	12	13	14	15	16	Final
AVCA Coaches																RV		
Off the Block Media	Not released																	

^The Media did not release a Pre-season or Week 1 poll.
