= 2023 Fairleigh Dickinson Knights men's volleyball team =

American college volleyball season

2023 Fairleigh Dickinson Knights men's volleyball
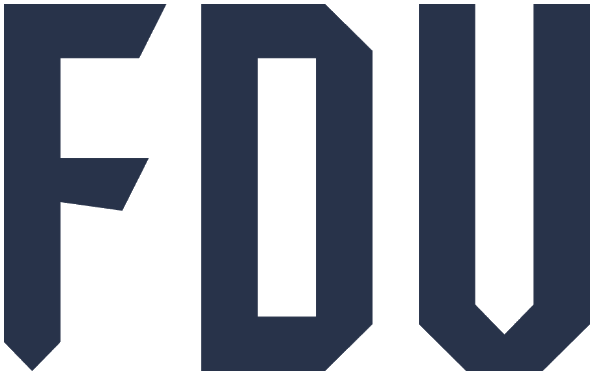
- Conference: Northeast Conference
- Record: 7-17 (4-10 NEC)
- Head coach: Karl France (2nd season)
- Home arena: Rothman Center

The 2023 Fairleigh Dickinson Knights men's volleyball team, the second Fairleigh Dickinson men's volleyball team, represents Fairleigh Dickinson University in the 2023 NCAA Division I & II men's volleyball season. The Knights, led by second year head coach Karl France, play their home games at Rothman Center. The Knights compete as a member of the newly created Northeast Conference men's volleyball conference. The Knights were picked to finish sixth in the NEC pre-season poll.

2023 Northeast Conference men's volleyball standings
	Conf.				Overall
Team	W		L	PCT	W		L	PCT
St. Francis ‍†‍‍	12	–	2	.857	16	–	12	.571
Daemen ‍‍‍	11	–	3	.786	17	–	7	.708
LIU ‍‍‡‍	10	–	4	.714	19	–	11	.633
Sacred Heart ‍‍‍	7	–	7	.500	12	–	13	.480
St. Francis Brooklyn ‍‍‍	5	–	9	.357	10	–	16	.385
Merrimack ‍‍‍	4	–	10	.286	10	–	16	.385
Fairleigh Dickinson ‍‍‍	4	–	10	.286	7	–	17	.292
D'Youville ‍‍‍	3	–	11	.214	10	–	13	.435
† – Conference champion ‡ – 2023 Northeast Tournament champion: y- Invited to the NCAA volleyball tournament As of March 27, 2025 Rankings from AVCA

== Season highlights ==
- Will be filled in as the season progresses.

== Roster ==
2023 Fairleigh Dickinson Knights roster
Defensive specialist/libero: 1 Grady Hoffman - Sophomore; 6 Diego Diaz - Sophomore; Middle blockers: 9 Naveen Fernando - Freshman; 10 Panagiotis Kourmouzos - Freshman; 14 Mihajlo Rodic - Sophomore; Middle hitters: 3 Santiago La Jara - Junior	Outside hitters: 2 Jack Lydon - Sophomore; 4 Dylan McFadden - Freshman; 12 Ethan Young - Junior; 13 Lorenzo Bonomo - Sophomore; 17 Artem Vetrov - Sophomore; 18 Davidson Claros - Freshman; 19 Alexander Zinkevich - Freshman; 25 Jael Deveaux - Sophomore	Opposite hitters: 16 Jamal Ellis Carballo - Freshman; Setters: 7 Rui Fernandez - Graduate; 8 Jose Angarita - Sophomore; 11 Baboloki Prince Silwane - Sophomore

== Schedule ==
TV/Internet Streaming information:

All home games will be streamed on NEC Front Row. Most road games will be streamed by the schools streaming service.

Date time	Opponent	Rank	Arena city (tournament)	Television	Score	Attendance	Record
1/07; 9 a.m.	vs. Belmont Abbey		Harrah's Resort and Casino; Atlantic City, NJ (JBJ Battle for the Boardwalk)		W 3–1 (25–21, 21–25, 25–21, 25–21)	539	1–0
1/13; 6 p.m.	@ American International		Henry A. Butova Gymnasium; Springfield, MA	AIC Stretch	W 3–0 (25–17, 25–15, 25–22)		2-0
1/14; 6 p.m.	American International		Rothman Center; Hackensack, NJ	NEC Front Row	W 3–0 (25–18, 25–19, 25–18)	147	3-0
1/20; 9 p.m.	@ #13 BYU		Smith Fieldhouse; Provo, UT	byutv.org	L 0–3 (20–25, 17–25, 15–25)	3,513	3–1
1/21; 9 p.m.	@ #13 BYU		Smith Fieldhouse; Provo, UT	BYUtv	L 0–3 (15–25, 19–25, 15–25)	4,125	3–2
2/10; 5 p.m.	St. Francis*		Rothman Center; Hackensack, NJ	NEC Front Row	L 0–3 (22-25, 21–25, 17–25)	270	3-3(br>(0-1)
2/11; 12 p.m.	#15 CSUN		Rothman Center; Hackensack, NJ	NEC Front Row	L 0–3 (11-25, 15–25, 23–25)	118	3-4
2/17; 5 p.m.	@ LIU*		Steinberg Wellness Center; Brooklyn, NY	NEC Front Row	L 0–3 (19-25, 14–25, 21–25)	61	3-5 (0-2)
2/18; 4 p.m.	@ St. Francis Brooklyn*		Generoso Pope Athletic Complex; Brooklyn, NY	NEC Front Row	L 1–3 (14-25, 28–26, 22–25, 21–25)	310	3-6 (0-3)
2/24; 5 p.m.	Merrimack*		Rothman Center; Brooklyn, NY	NEC Front Row	W 3-2 (25-16, 21–25, 25–20, 23–25, 15–11)	225	4-6 (1-3)
2/25; 6 p.m.	Sacred Heart*		Rothman Center; Brooklyn, NY	NEC Front Row	L 1–3 (20-25, 15–25, 25–16, 23–25)	225	4-7 (1-4)
3/03; 7 p.m.	@ Princeton		Dillon Gymnasium; Princeton, NJ	ESPN+	L 0–3 (18-25, 18–25, 17–25)	0	4-8
3/10; 7 p.m.	@ St. Francis*		DeGol Arena; Loretto, PA	NEC Front Row	L 0–3 (21-25, 24–26, 20–25)	146	4-9 (1-5)
3/16; 6 p.m.	@ Belmont Abbey		Wheeler Center; Belmont, NC	Conference Carolinas DN	L 2–3 (22-25, 25–18, 29–31, 25–21, 8–15)	85	4-10
3/17; 7 p.m.	@ George Mason		Recreation Athletic Complex; Fairfax, VA	ESPN+	L 1–3 (19-25, 26–28, 25–23, 20–25)	151	4-11
3/18; 5 p.m.	@ George Mason		Recreation Athletic Complex; Fairfax, VA	ESPN+	L 0–3 (21-25, 19–25, 21–25)	196	4-12
3/24; 6 p.m.	@ Daemen*		Charles L. & Gloria B. Lumsden Gymnasium; Amherst, NY	NEC Front Row	L 0–3 (15-25, 13–25, 22–25)	75	4-13 (1-6)
3/25; 5 p.m.	@ D'Youville*		College Center Gymnasium; Buffalo, NY	ECC SN	L 2–3 (25-22, 16–25, 19–25, 25–18, 11–15)	75	4-14 (1-7)
3/31; 7 p.m.	@ Merrimack*		Hammel Court; North Andover, MA	NEC Front Row	L 1–3 (26-24, 20–25, 18–25, 22–25)	156	4-15 (1-8)
4/01; 4 p.m.	@ Sacred Heart*		William H. Pitt Center; Fairfield, CT	NEC Front Row	W 3-2 (21-25, 25–19, 25–21, 21–25, 17–15)	112	5-15 (2-8)
4/07; 5 p.m.	LIU*		Rothman Center; Brooklyn, NY	NEC Front Row	L 1–3 (18-25, 25–23, 14–25, 26–28)	41	5-16 (2-9)
4/08; 4 p.m.	St. Francis Brooklyn*		Rothman Center; Brooklyn, NY	NEC Front Row	L 1–3 (25-18, 18–25, 21–25, 23–25)	29	5-17 (2-10)
4/14; 5 p.m.	Daemen*		Rothman Center; Brooklyn, NY	NEC Front Row	W 3-1 (25-18, 25–14, 23–25, 25–20)	54	6-17 (3-10)
4/15; 4 p.m.	D'Youville*		Rothman Center; Brooklyn, NY	NEC Front Row	W 3-0 (25-16, 26–24, 25–18)	54	7-17 (4-10)

*-Indicates conference match.
Times listed are Eastern Time Zone.

== Announcers for televised games ==
- American International: Ryan Beebe
- American International: Mark Ernay
- BYU: Jarom Jordan, Steve Vail, & Lauren McClain
- BYU: Jarom Jordan, Steve Vail, & Lauren McClain
- St. Francis:
- CSUN:
- LIU:
- St. Francis Brooklyn:
- Merrimack:
- Sacred Heart:
- Princeton:
- St. Francis:
- Belmont Abbey:
- George Mason:
- George Mason:
- Daemen:
- D'Youville:
- Merrimack:
- Sacred Heart:
- LIU:
- St. Francis Brooklyn:
- Daemen:
- D'Youville:
