= 2023 Sacred Heart Pioneers men's volleyball team =

American college volleyball season

2023 Sacred Heart Pioneers men's volleyball
- Conference: Northeast Conference
- Record: 11-12 (7-7 NEC)
- Head coach: Adam Niemczynowicz (1st season)
- Assistant coach: Dan Ward (1st season)
- Home arena: William H. Pitt Center

The 2023 Sacred Heart Pioneers men's volleyball team represented Sacred Heart University in the 2023 NCAA Division I & II men's volleyball season. The Pioneers, led by first year head coach Adam Niemczynowicz, played their home games at William H. Pitt Center. The Pioneers competed as a member of the newly created Northeast Conference men's volleyball conference. The Pioneers were picked to finish fifth in the NEC pre-season poll.

2023 Northeast Conference men's volleyball standings
	Conf.				Overall
Team	W		L	PCT	W		L	PCT
St. Francis ‍†‍‍	12	–	2	.857	16	–	12	.571
Daemen ‍‍‍	11	–	3	.786	17	–	7	.708
LIU ‍‍‡‍	10	–	4	.714	19	–	11	.633
Sacred Heart ‍‍‍	7	–	7	.500	12	–	13	.480
St. Francis Brooklyn ‍‍‍	5	–	9	.357	10	–	16	.385
Merrimack ‍‍‍	4	–	10	.286	10	–	16	.385
Fairleigh Dickinson ‍‍‍	4	–	10	.286	7	–	17	.292
D'Youville ‍‍‍	3	–	11	.214	10	–	13	.435
† – Conference champion ‡ – 2023 Northeast Tournament champion: y- Invited to the NCAA volleyball tournament As of March 27, 2025 Rankings from AVCA

== Roster ==
2023 Sacred Heart Pioneers roster
Defensive specialist/libero: 1 Gregory DeGeorge - Junior; 2 Tyler Kwinta - Senior; 3 Ardian Kodzodziku - Senior; 4 Jeremiah Bernardo - Junior; 6 Angus Henricks - Sophomore; 7 Cole Younger - Junior; 23 Ian Terrassa - Sophomore; Middle blockers: 16 Ife Loverton - Graduate; 17 Ethan Cohen - Sophomore; 21 Ryan Benscoter - Sophomore; 25 Ben Lille - Freshman; 28 Caden Cole - Freshman	Outside hitters: 8 Carlos Terrassa - Junior; 9 Brady Hoelperl - Junior; 10 Thomas Tustison - Sophomore; 12 Mark Berry - Junior; 14 Nick Galasso - Senior; 15 Patrick Mucherino - Junior; 20 Dylan McClung - Sophomore	Opposite hitters: 5 Carter Lyons - Freshman; 13 Carlos Santa Cruz - Junior; Setters: 2 Tyler Kwinta - Senior; 11 Teddy Payne - Junior; 13 Carlos Santa Cruz - Junior; 18 Gabriel Garcia - Sophomore; 19 Colin Stevens - Sophomore; 26 Cade Trujillo - Sophomore

== Schedule ==
TV/Internet Streaming information:

All home games will be streamed on NEC Front Row. Most road games will be streamed by the schools streaming service.

Date time	Opponent	Rank	Arena city (tournament)	Television	Score	Attendance	Record
1/13; 7 p.m.	Harvard		William H. Pitt Center; Fairfield, CT	NEC Front Row	L 1-3 (25-15, 23-25, 20–25, 19-25)	223	0-1
1/14; 1 p.m.	@ NJIT		Wellness and Events Center; Newark, NJ	ESPN+	L 0-3 (24-26, 21-25, 12–25)	233	0-2
1/18; 7 p.m.	Stevens		William H. Pitt Center; Fairfield, CT	NEC Front Row	W 3–2 (25–18, 25–15, 17–25, 24–26, 15–11)	183	1–2
1/27; 7 p.m.	@ Purdue Fort Wayne		Hilliard Gates Sports Center; Fort Wayne, IN	ESPN+	L 0-3 (22-25, 22-25, 12–25)	434	1-3
1/28; 5 p.m.	@ #8 Ball State		Worthen Arena; Muncie, IN	ESPN+ or Ball State All-Access	L 0-3 (11-25, 16-25, 21–25)	1,371	1-4
2/03; 7 p.m.	@ Princeton		Dillon Gymnasium; Princeton, NJ	ESPN+	L 1-3 (16-25, 25-23, 14–25, 22-25)	0	1-5
2/07; TBA	@ American International		Henry A. Butova Gymnasium; Springfield, MA	AIC Stretch	W 3-1 (19-25, 25-17, 25–18, 25-20)	82	2-5
2/17; 7 p.m.	D'Youville*		William H. Pitt Center; Fairfield, CT	NEC Front Row	W 3-0 (25-17, 25-16, 25-19)	136	3-5 (1-0)
2/19; 11 a.m.	Daemen*		William H. Pitt Center; Fairfield, CT	NEC Front Row	L 2-3 (13-25, 26-24, 30-28, 21-25, 11-15)	147	3-6 (1-1)
2/24; 6 p.m.	@ St. Francis*		DeGol Arena; Loretta, PA	NEC Front Row	L 0-3 (21-25, 17-25, 18-25)	0	3-7 (1-2)
2/25; 5 p.m.	@ Fairleigh Dickinson*		Rothman Center; Brooklyn, NY	NEC Front Row	W 3-1 (25-20, 25-15, 16-25, 25-23)	225	4-7 (2-2)
3/10; 7 p.m.	Merrimack*		William H. Pitt Center; Fairfield, CT	NEC Front Row	W 3-2 (25-18, 22-25, 23-25, 25-13, 15-10)	107	5-7 (3-2)
3/18; 12 p.m.	@ Merrimack*		Hammel Court; North Andover, MA	NEC Front Row	L 1-3 (25-19, 19-25, 23-25, 20-25)	156	5-8 (3-3)
3/22; 7 p.m.	@ Harvard		Malkin Athletic Center; Cambridge, MA	ESPN+	W 3-2 (25-12, 18-25, 18-25, 25-22, 15-8)	155	6-8
3/24; 7 p.m.	St. Francis Brooklyn*		William H. Pitt Center; Fairfield, CT	NEC Front Row	W 3-0 (33-31, 25-13, 25-19)	127	7-8 (4-3)
3/25; 5 p.m.	LIU*		William H. Pitt Center; Fairfield, CT	NEC Front Row	L 1-3 (14-25, 22-25, 27-25, 20-25)	104	7-9 (4-4)
3/31; 7 p.m.	St. Francis*		William H. Pitt Center; Fairfield, CT	NEC Front Row	L 0-3 (20-25, 18-25, 13-25)	213	7-10 (4-5)
4/01; 5 p.m.	Fairleigh Dickinson*		William H. Pitt Center; Fairfield, CT	NEC Front Row	L 2-3 (25-21, 19-25, 21-25, 25-21, 15-17)	112	7-11 (4-6)
4/04; 7 p.m.	American International		William H. Pitt Center; Fairfield, CT	NEC Front Row	W 3-0 (25-15, 25-11, 25-21)	169	8-11
4/07; 6 p.m.	@ Daemen*		Charles L. & Gloria B. Lumsden Gymnasium; Amherst, NY	NEC Front Row	L 1-3 (18-25, 26-24, 12-25, 22-25)	176	8-12 (4-7)
4/08; 4 p.m.	@ D'Youville*		College Center Gymnasium; Buffalo, NY	ECC SN	W 3-1 (22-25, 25-23, 25-22, 25-19)	85	9-12 (5-7)
4/14; TBA	@ St. Francis Brooklyn*		Generoso Pope Athletic Complex; Brooklyn, NY	NEC Front Row	W 3-1 (25-21, 20-25, 25-21, 25-22)	85	10-12 (6-7)
4/15; 7 p.m.	@ LIU*		Steinberg Wellness Center; Brooklyn, NY	NEC Front Row	W 3-2 (21-25, 27-25, 25-23, 22-25, 29-27)	187	11-12 (7-7)

*-Indicates conference match.
Times listed are Eastern Time Zone.

== Announcers for televised games ==
- Harvard: Bernie Picozzi
- NJIT: Ira Thor
- Stevens: Evan Cormier & Robert Finizio
- Purdue Fort Wayne:
- Ball State:
- Princeton:
- American International:
- D'Youville:
- Daemen:
- St. Francis:
- Fairleigh Dickinson:
- Merrimack:
- Merrimack:
- Harvard:
- St. Francis Brooklyn:
- LIU:
- St. Francis:
- Farleigh Dickinson:
- American International:
- Daemen:
- D'Youville:
- St. Francis Brooklyn:
- LIU:
