= 2023 Merrimack Warriors men's volleyball team =

Sports team in 2023

2023 Merrimack Warriors men's volleyball
- Conference: Northeast Conference
- Record: 10-15 (4-10 NEC)
- Head coach: Ray Lewis (1st season)
- Home arena: Hammel Court

The 2023 Merrimack Warriors men's volleyball team, the first ever Merrimack men's volleyball team, represents Merrimack College in the 2023 NCAA Division I & II men's volleyball season. The Warriors, led by first year head coach Ray Lewis, play their home games at Hammel Court. The Warriors play in the newly created Northeast Conference men's volleyball conference. They were picked to finish seventh in the conference preseason poll.

2023 Northeast Conference men's volleyball standings
	Conf.				Overall
Team	W		L	PCT	W		L	PCT
St. Francis ‍†‍‍	12	–	2	.857	16	–	12	.571
Daemen ‍‍‍	11	–	3	.786	17	–	7	.708
LIU ‍‍‡‍	10	–	4	.714	19	–	11	.633
Sacred Heart ‍‍‍	7	–	7	.500	12	–	13	.480
St. Francis Brooklyn ‍‍‍	5	–	9	.357	10	–	16	.385
Merrimack ‍‍‍	4	–	10	.286	10	–	16	.385
Fairleigh Dickinson ‍‍‍	4	–	10	.286	7	–	17	.292
D'Youville ‍‍‍	3	–	11	.214	10	–	13	.435
† – Conference champion ‡ – 2023 Northeast Tournament champion: y- Invited to the NCAA volleyball tournament As of March 17, 2025 Rankings from AVCA

== Season highlights ==
- Will be filled in as the season progresses.

== Roster ==
2023 Merrimack Warriors roster
Defensive specialist/libero: 1 Anthony Clapp - Sophomore; 11 Kyle Standage - Freshman; 21 Kyle Wagner - Freshman; Middle blockers: 6 Ian Callahan - Junior; 7 Sage Gatling - Sophomore; 9 Xander Thesz - Senior; 13 Matthew Motes - Junior; 25 Antonio Barraza - Senior	Outside hitters: 2 Zyshonne Lang - Freshman; 7 Sage Gatling - Sophomore; 8 Tanner Planz - Freshman	Opposite hitters: 3 Miles Dewhirst - Junior; 5 Logan Whitaker - Freshman; 24 Theo Hackett - Freshman; Setters: 4 Carson Bashford - Freshman; 10 Alejandro Campos - Freshman

== Schedule ==
TV/Internet Streaming information:

All home games will be streamed on NEC Front Row. Most road games will be streamed by the schools streaming service.

Date time	Opponent	Rank	Arena city (tournament)	Television	Score	Attendance	Record
1/14; 7 p.m.	@ #4 Penn State		Rec Hall; University Park, PA	B1G+	L 0-3 (16-25, 14-25, 13-25)	550	0-1
1/17; 7 p.m.	Harvard		Hammel Court; North Andover, MA	NEC Front Row	L 0–3 (22–25, 14–25, 20–25)	232	0–2
1/20; 5 p.m.	@ Mount Olive		Kornegay Arena; Mount Olive, NC	Conference Carolinas DN	L 0–3 (23–25, 20–25, 21–25)	121	0-3
1/21; TBA	@ Barton		Wilson Gymnasium; Wilson, NC	Conference Carolinas DN	W 3–1 (25-22, 19-25, 25-23, 25-20)	200	1-3
1/22; 1 p.m.	@ Queens		Curry Arena; Charlotte, NC	YouTube	W 3–2 (25-22, 16-25, 20-25, 31-29, 15-13)	76	2-3
1/29; 1 p.m.	Central State		Hammel Court; North Andover, MA	NEC Front Row	W 3–2 (20-25, 18-25, 25-22, 25-23, 15-12)	178	3-3
2/3; 7 p.m.	@ American International		Henry A. Butova Gymnasium; Springfield, MA	AIC Stretch	W 3–1 (20-25, 25-18, 25-21, 25-23)	104	4-3
2/4; 5 p.m.	Fisher		Hammel Court; North Andover, MA	NEC Front Row	W 3–0 (25-8, 25-7, 25-8)		5-3
2/8; 7 p.m.	@ Harvard		Malkin Athletic Center; Cambridge, MA	ESPN+	L 0-3 (20-25, 20-25, 21-25)	105	5-4
2/17; 7 p.m.	Daemen*		Hammel Court; North Andover, MA	NEC Front Row	L 2-3 (18-25, 25-21, 21-25, 25-21, 11-15)	188	5-5 (0-1)
2/18; 7 p.m.	D'Youville*		Hammel Court; North Andover, MA	NEC Front Row	W 3-2 (25-15, 24-26, 25-16, 16-25, 15-12)	167	6-5 (1-1)
2/24; TBA	@ Fairleigh Dickinson*		Rothman Center; Hackensack, NJ	NEC Front Row	L 2-3 (16-25, 25-21, 20-25, 25-23, 11-15)	225	6-6 (1-2)
2/25; 7 p.m.	@ St. Francis*		DeGol Arena; Loretto, PA	NEC Front Row	L 0-3 (18-25, 21-25, 20-25)	0	6-7 (1-3)
3/03; 5 p.m.	NJIT		Hammel Court; North Andover, MA	NEC Front Row	L 0-3 (16-25, 22-25, 23-25)	160	6-8
3/10; 7 p.m.	@ Sacred Heart*		William H. Pitt Center; Fairfield, CT	NEC Front Row	L 2-3 (18-25, 25-22, 25-23, 13-25, 10-15)	107	6-9 (1-4)
3/17; 7 p.m.	American International		Hammel Court; North Andover, MA	NEC Front Row	W 3-1	44	7-9
3/18; 7 p.m.	Sacred Heart*		Hammel Court; North Andover, MA	NEC Front Row	W 3-1 (19-25, 25-19, 25-23, 25-20)	156	8-9 (2-4)
3/24; 5 p.m.	LIU*		Hammel Court; North Andover, MA	NEC Front Row	L 1-3 (17-25, 25-20, 22-25, 18-25)	97	8-10 (2-5)
3/25; TBA	St. Francis Brooklyn*		Hammel Court; North Andover, MA	NEC Front Row	L 0-3 (22-25, 22-25, 20-25)	154	8-11 (2-6)
3/31; 5 p.m.	Fairleigh Dickinson*		Hammel Court; North Andover, MA	NEC Front Row	W 3-1 (24-26, 25-20, 25-18, 25-22)	156	9-11 (3-6)
4/01; TBA	St. Francis*		Hammel Court; North Andover, MA	NEC Front Row	L 1-3 (21-25, 13-25, 25-17, 22-25)	143	9-12 (3-7)
4/07; 5 p.m.	@ D'Youville*		College Center Gymnasium; Buffalo, NY	ECC SN	L 1-3 (25-18, 22-25, 17-25, 21-25)	65	9-13 (3-8)
4/08; TBA	@ Daemen*		Charles L. & Gloria B. Lumsden Gymnasium; Amherst, NY	NEC Front Row	L 0-3 (20-25, 18-25, 16-25)	100	9-14 (3-9)
4/14; 5 p.m.	@ LIU*		Steinberg Wellness Center; Brooklyn, NY	NEC Front Row	L 0-3 (17-25, 26-28, 17-25)	154	9-15 (3-10)
4/15; 7 p.m.	@ St. Francis Brooklyn*		Generoso Pope Athletic Complex; Brooklyn, NY	NEC Front Row	W 3-1 (25-18, 15-25, 25-20, 25-16)	42	10-15 (4-10)

*-Indicates conference match.
Times listed are Eastern Time Zone.

== Announcers for televised games ==
- Penn State: Dylan Price & Thomas English
- Harvard: No commentary
- Mount Olive: Michael Deleo
- Barton
- Queens:
- Central State:
- American International:
- Fisher:
- Harvard:
- Daemen:
- D'Youville:
- Fairleigh Dickinson:
- St. Francis
- NJIT:
- Sacred Heart:
- American International:
- Sacred Heart:
- LIU:
- St. Francis Brooklyn:
- Fairleigh Dickinson:
- St. Francis:
- D'Youville :
- Daemen :
- LIU:
- St. Francis Brooklyn:
