= 2023 D'Youville Saints men's volleyball team =

American college volleyball season

2023 D'Youville Saints men's volleyball
- Conference: Northeast Conference
- Record: 10-13 (3-11 NEC)
- Head coach: Chris Krueger (4th season)
- Assistant coaches: Adam Heftka (3rd season); Pat Stroh (2nd season)
- Home arena: College Center Gymnasium

The 2023 D'Youville Saints men's volleyball team represented D'Youville University in the 2023 NCAA Division I & II men's volleyball season. The Saints (formerly the Spartans) were led by fourth year head coach Chris Krueger and played their home games at College Center Gymnasium. The Saints competed as a member of the newly created Northeast Conference men's volleyball conference and were picked to finish eighth in the NEC.

2023 Northeast Conference men's volleyball standings
	Conf.				Overall
Team	W		L	PCT	W		L	PCT
Saint Francis ‍†‍‍	12	–	2	.857	16	–	12	.571
Daemen ‍‍‍	11	–	3	.786	17	–	7	.708
LIU ‍‍‡‍	10	–	4	.714	19	–	11	.633
Sacred Heart ‍‍‍	7	–	7	.500	12	–	13	.480
St. Francis Brooklyn ‍‍‍	5	–	9	.357	10	–	16	.385
Merrimack ‍‍‍	4	–	10	.286	10	–	16	.385
Fairleigh Dickinson ‍‍‍	4	–	10	.286	7	–	17	.292
D'Youville ‍‍‍	3	–	11	.214	10	–	13	.435
† – Conference champion ‡ – Northeast tournament champion

== Roster ==
2023 D'Youville Saints roster
Defensive specialist/libero: 6 Nathan Dishaw - (redshirt) Freshman; 7 Anthony Dean - Graduate; 17 Sebastian Herbst - Junior; 22 Ian Mendoza - Sophomore; Middle blockers: 5 Spencer Boakye - (redshirt) Freshman; 13 Ty Parker - Freshman; 18 Theethat Vichitchoti - Sophomore; 21 Tymek Brzoza - Sophomore; 23 Haven Wankerl - Freshman	Outside hitters: 2 Kacper Taudul - Freshman; 3 Jacob Malak - Sophomore; 9 Dan Busha - Senior; 10 Shaun Vattakuzhiyil - Freshman; 12 Luke Fincham - Freshman; 13 Ty Parker - Freshman; 16 Ian De Wilde - Sophomore	Setters: 1 Randy Adorno - Sophomore; 7 Anthony Dean - Graduate

== Schedule ==
TV/Internet Streaming information:

All home games will be streamed on ECC Sports Network (ECC SN). Most road games will be streamed by the schools streaming service, including NEC Front Row.

Date time	Opponent	Rank	Arena city (tournament)	Television	Score	Attendance	Record
1/09; 7 p.m.	Princeton		College Center Gymnasium; Buffalo, NY	ECC SN	L 0–3 (25–27, 17–25, 17–25)	80	0–1
1/14; 7 p.m.	vs. Belmont Abbey		Bernard H. Wehrle, Sr. Athletic Arena; Charleston, WV		W 3–0 (25–22, 25–17, 25–20)	13	1-1
1/15; 2 p.m.	@ Charleston (WV)		Bernard H. Wehrle, Sr. Athletic Arena; Charleston, WV	MEC TV	L 0–3 (18–25, 23–25, 23–25)	54	1-2
1/20; 7 p.m.	American International		College Center Gymnasium; Buffalo, NY	ECC SN	W 3–0 (25–9, 25–15, 25–17)	70	2-2
1/27; 7 p.m.	Central State		College Center Gymnasium; Buffalo, NY	ECC SN	W 3–1 (25–23, 25–22, 23–25, 25–19)	60	3-2
2/10; 7 p.m.	Daemen*		College Center Gymnasium; Buffalo, NY	ECC SN	L 0-3 (18–25, 21–25, 14–25)	225	3-3 (0–1)
2/17; 7 p.m.	@ Sacred Heart*		William H. Pitt Center; Fairfield, CT	NEC Front Row	L 0-3 (17–25, 16–25, 19–25)	136	3-4 (0–2)
2/18; 7 p.m.	@ Merrimack*		Hammel Court; North Andover, MA	NEC Front Row	L 2-3 (15–25, 26–24, 16–25, 25–16, 12–15)	167	3-5 (0–3)
2/23; 6 p.m.	@ Daemen*		Charles L. & Gloria B. Lumsden Gymnasium; Amhest, NY	NEC Front Row	L 1-3 (13–25, 13–25, 25–21, 19–25)	180	3-6 (0–4)
2/25; 12 p.m.	St. Francis Brooklyn*		College Center Gymnasium; Buffalo, NY	ECC SN	L 0-3 (17–25, 23–25, 27–29)	95	3-7 (0–5)
3/03; 7 p.m.	Alderson Broaddus		College Center Gymnasium; Buffalo, NY	ECC SN	W 3-1 (25–19, 25–21, 25–27, 25–19)	100	4-7
3/08; 6 p.m.	LIU*		College Center Gymnasium; Buffalo, NY	ECC SN	L 1-3 (25–23, 23–25, 18–25, 20–25)	75	4-8 (0–6)
3/10; 7 p.m.	@ American International		Henry A. Butova Gymnasium; Springfield, MA	AIC Stretch	W 3-1 (25–15, 25–19, 23–25, 25–15)	102	5-8
3/11; 12 p.m.	@ American International		Henry A. Butova Gymnasium; Springfield, MA	AIC Stretch	W 3-0 (25–18, 25–19, 25–17)	114	6-8
3/18; 4 p.m.	Elmira		College Center Gymnasium; Buffalo, NY	ECC SN	W 3-1 (25–22, 29–27, 21–25, 25–20)	55	7-8
3/24; 5 p.m.	St. Francis*		College Center Gymnasium; Buffalo, NY	ECC SN	L 0-3 (15–25, 15–25, 21–25)	95	7-9 (0–7)
3/25; 4 p.m.	Fairleigh Dickinson*		College Center Gymnasium; Buffalo, NY	ECC SN	W 3-2 (22–25, 25–16, 25–19, 18–25, 15–11)	75	8-9 (1–7)
3/31; 5 p.m.	@ St. Francis Brooklyn*		Generoso Pope Athletic Complex; Brooklyn, NY	NEC Front Row	W 3-2 (22–25, 25–21, 25–21, 23–25, 15–12)	87	9-9 (2–7)
4/01; 4 p.m.	@ LIU*		Steinberg Wellness Center; Brooklyn, NY	NEC Front Row	L 1-3 (25–17, 18–25, 21–25, 18–25)	90	9-10 (2–8)
4/07; 7 p.m.	Merrimack*		College Center Gymnasium; Buffalo, NY	ECC SN	W 3-1 (18–25, 25–22, 25–17, 25–21)	65	10-10 (3–8)
4/08; 4 p.m.	Sacred Heart*		College Center Gymnasium; Buffalo, NY	ECC SN	L 1-3 (25–22, 23–25, 22–25, 19–25)	85	10-11 (3–9)
4/14; 7 p.m.	@ St. Francis*		DeGol Arena; Loretto, PA	NEC Front Row	L 0-3 (20–25, 14–25, 12–25)	186	10-12 (3–10)
4/15; 4 p.m.	@ Fairleigh Dickinson*		Rothman Center; Hackensack, NJ	NEC Front Row	L 0-3 (16–25, 24–26, 18–25)	54	10-13 (3–11)

*-Indicates conference match.
Times listed are Eastern Time Zone.

== Announcers for televised games ==
- Princeton: Trevor Butz
- Charleston (WV): Jack Withrow
- American International:
- Central State:
- Daemen:
- Sacred Heart:
- Merrimack:
- Daemen:
- St. Francis Brooklyn:
- Alderson Broaddus:
- LIU:
- American International:
- American International:
- Elmira:
- St. Francis:
- Fairleigh Dickinson:
- St. Francis Brooklyn:
- LIU:
- Merrimack:
- Sacred Heart:
- St. Francis:
- Fairleigh Dickinson:
