= Robertson Gymnasium =

Indoor arena in Santa Barbara, California

Coordinates: 34.4158°N 119.8492°W

- Rob Gym

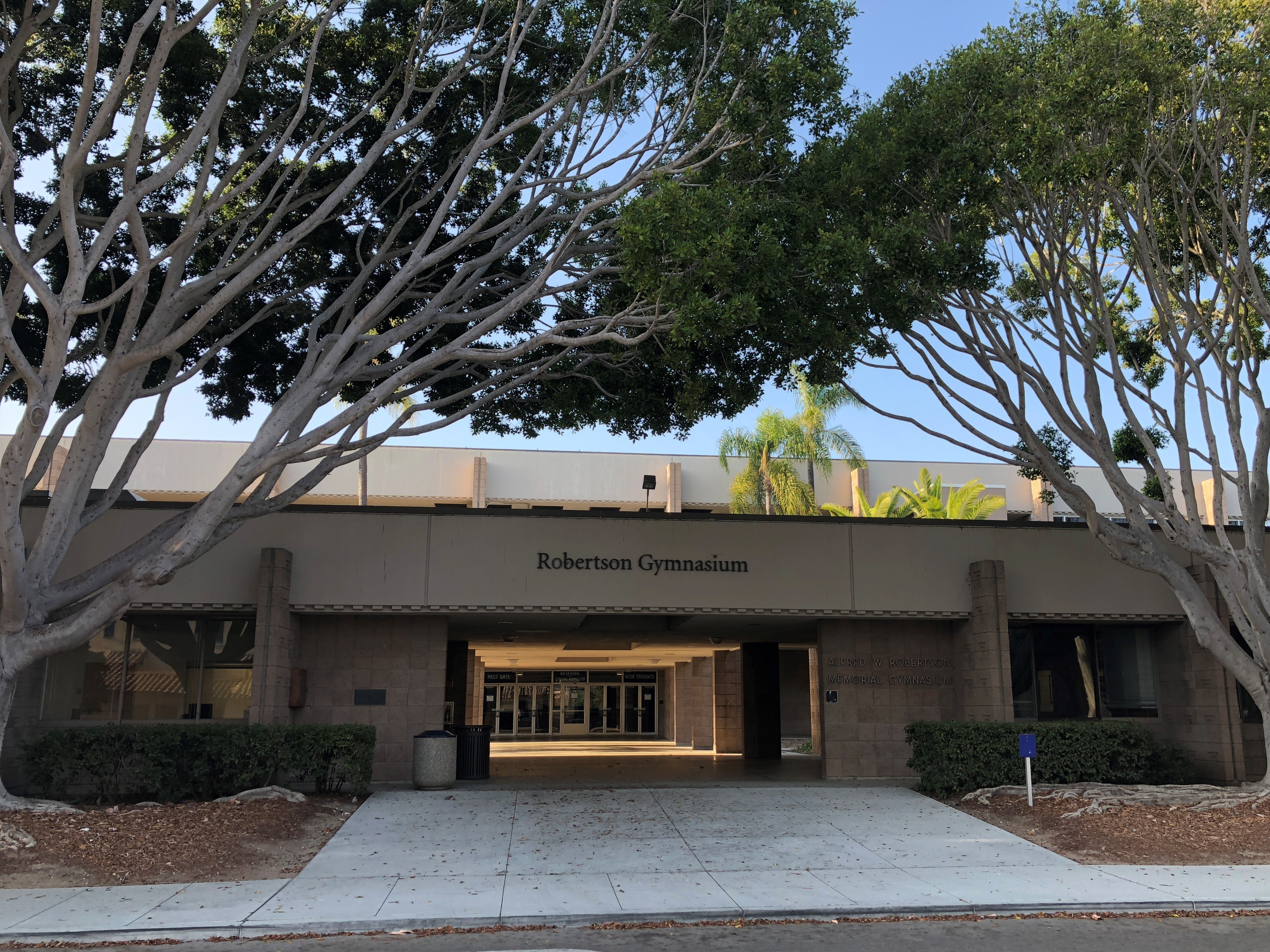
- Interactive map of Robertson Gymnasium
- Full name: Robertson Gymnasium
- Location: Santa Barbara, California
- Owner: University of California, Santa Barbara
- Capacity: 2,600 to 4,000
- Scoreboard: No
- Record attendance: 2,935 on 12 April 1997 for Men's Volleyball vs. UCLA Bruins

Construction
- Built: 1958
- Opened: 1959; 67 years ago
- Cost: $1,602,499
- Architect: Charles Luckman Associates

Tenant
- UC Santa Barbara Gauchos volleyball

Website
- ucsb.edu/robertson_gymnasium

Robertson Gymnasium is a 2,600 to 4,000-seat multi-purpose indoor arena located on the campus of the University of California, Santa Barbara in Santa Barbara, California. The gym serves as home venue to the UC Santa Barbara Gauchos volleyball team.

== History ==
Robertson Gymnasium was built in 1958 and completed in 1959. The architect responsible for creating Rob Gym was Charles Luckman Associates, who was also the main architect for the Kennedy Space Center and Lyndon B. Johnson Space Center, as well as The Forum and Madison Square Garden.

The stadium was named after Alfred W. Robertson, a former California State Assemblyman instrumental in transferring the facilities of Santa Barbara State College into the University of California system.

== Tenants ==
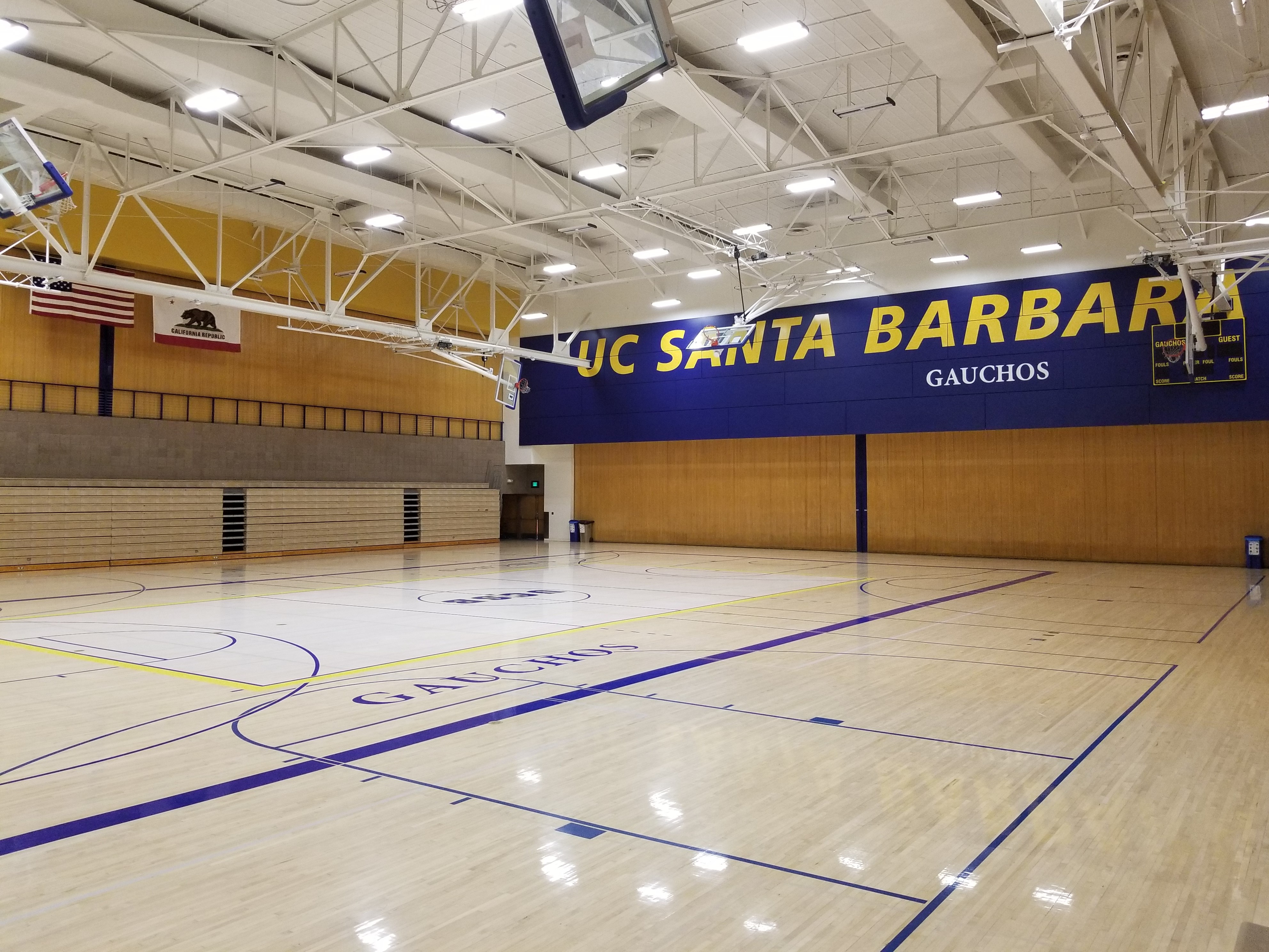
Robertson Gymnasium interior

The main tenant of Rob Gym is the UC Santa Barbara Gauchos athletic program. Currently, the UC Santa Barbara Gauchos men's volleyball team is the only team that calls Rob Gym home, although the women's team has also played home games there.

In addition to serving as an athletic arena, Rob Gym has seen its fair share of concerts. Notable acts to play at Rob Gym include Boston on 12 March 1977 and the Grateful Dead on 29 May 1969, Cream on 24 May 1968, Jimi Hendrix on 11 February 1968, The Doors on 28 October 1967, and Bruce Springsteen on November 1, 1975, just after his cover of Time magazine.

Most of the concerts, and with them the Gauchos' basketball teams, would move to the Thunderdome during the 1979-80 school year.
