= 2023 Stanford Cardinal men's volleyball team =

American college volleyball season

2023 Stanford Cardinal men's volleyball
- Conference: Mountain Pacific Sports Federation
- Record: 15–12 (6–6 MPSF)
- Head coach: John Kosty (17th season)
- Assistant coaches: Ken Shibuya (17th season); Daniel Rasay (10th season)
- Home arena: Burnham Pavilion & Ford Center; Maples Pavilion

The 2023 Stanford Cardinal men's volleyball team represented Stanford University in the 2023 NCAA Division I & II men's volleyball season. The Cardinal, led by seventeenth year head coach John Kosty, played their home games split between Burnham Pavilion & Ford Center and Maples Pavilion. The Cardinal were members of the MPSF and were picked to finish third in the MPSF preseason poll.

2023 Mountain Pacific Sports Federation men's volleyball standings
| | Conf. | | | | Overall |
| Team | W | | L | PCT | W | | L | PCT |
|---|---|---|---|---|---|---|---|---|
| No. 1 UCLA ‍†‍‡‍^{y} | 12 | – | 0 | 1.000 | 31 | – | 2 | .939 |
| No. 8 BYU ‍‍‍ | 8 | – | 4 | .667 | 19 | – | 7 | .731 |
| No. 6 Grand Canyon ‍‍‍^{y} | 6 | – | 6 | .500 | 22 | – | 8 | .733 |
| No. 9 Stanford ‍‍‍ | 6 | – | 6 | .500 | 15 | – | 13 | .536 |
| No. 10 Pepperdine ‍‍‍ | 5 | – | 7 | .417 | 16 | – | 14 | .533 |
| No. 12 USC ‍‍‍ | 3 | – | 9 | .250 | 10 | – | 16 | .385 |
| Concordia Irvine ‍‍‍ | 2 | – | 10 | .167 | 8 | – | 19 | .296 |
† – Conference champion ‡ – MPSF tournament champion y – Invited to the NCAA tournament Rankings from AVCA

== Season highlights ==
- Will be filled in as the season progresses.

== Roster ==
>2023 Stanford Cardinal roster
| Defensive specialist/libero: 2 Justin Lui - (redshirt) Senior; 3 Matt Martinez - Junior; Middle blockers: 1 Adam Chang - Senior; 9 Ethan Hill - (redshirt) Junior; 16 Nathaniel Gates - Senior; 22 Luke McFall - Freshman | Outside hitters: 4 Aidan Peters - Junior; 5 Alex Rottman - Freshman; 7 Theo Snoey - Freshman; 10 Kevin Lamp - Senior; 15 Will Rottman - Senior; 17 Ryan DuRoss - Freshman | Opposite hitters: 6 Luke Turner - Junior; 14 Moses Wagner - Freshman; 24 Hunter Dickey - Graduate; Setters: 11 Chris Kelly - Junior; 12 Nathan Lietzke - Senior; 23 Theoren Brouillette - Freshman |

== Schedule ==
TV/Internet Streaming information:

All home games will be televised on Pac-12 Network or streamed on Pac-12+ Stanford's streaming page. Most road games will also be streamed by the schools streaming service. The conference tournament will be streamed by FloVolleyball.

| Date time | Opponent | Rank^{(tournament seed)} | Arena city (tournament) | Television | Score | Attendance | Record (MPSF record) |
|---|---|---|---|---|---|---|---|
| 1/6; 7 p.m. | St. Francis | #9 | Maples Pavilion; Stanford, CA | P12+ STAN | W 3–1 (25–16, 25–16, 21–25, 25–22) | 306 | 1–0 |
| 1/7; 5 p.m. | St. Francis | #9 | Maples Pavilion; Stanford, CA | P12+ STAN | W 3–2 (25–18, 23–25, 23–25, 25–21, 15–13) | 404 | 2–0 |
| 1/13; 7 p.m. | #10 UC Santa Barbara | #8 | Burnham Pavilion & Ford Center; Stanford, CA | P12+ STAN | W 3–0 (25–16, 26-24, 25–18) | 596 | 3-0 |
| 1/14; 5 p.m. | #10 UC Santa Barbara | #8 | Burham Pavilion & Ford Center; Stanford, CA | P12+ STAN | W 3–2 (20-25, 25-22, 24–26, 26-24, 15-12) | 585 | 4-0 |
| 1/20; 5 p.m. | vs. #15 Lewis | #8 | Austin Convention Center; Austin, TX (First Point Men's Volleyball Collegiate Challenge) | Volleyball World TV | W 3–1 (24-26, 25-23, 25–20, 25-22) | 1,234 | 5-0 |
| 1/21; 5 p.m. | vs. #4 Penn State | #8 | Austin Convention Center; Austin, TX (First Point Men's Volleyball Collegiate Challenge) | Volleyball World TV | L 1-3 (18-25, 17-25, 25–20, 23-25) | 1,404 | 5-1 |
| 1/28; 6 p.m. | @ UC Santa Cruz | #7 | Kaiser Permanente Arena; Santa Cruz, CA | YouTube | W 3–0 (25-21, 25-22, 25–20) | 388 | 6-1 |
| 2/3; 5 p.m. | @ CSUN | #6 | Premier America Credit Union Arena; Northridge, CA | ESPN+ | L 2-3 (25-21, 24-26, 25–22, 18-25, 13-15) | 425 | 6-2 |
| 2/4; 1 p.m. | @ The Master's | #6 | The MacArthur Center; Santa Clarita, CA | GSAC SN | W 3–0 (25-23, 25-21, 25–18) | 0 | 7-2 |
| 2/10; 7 p.m. | #1 Hawai'i | #8 | Burnham Pavilion & Ford Center; Stanford, CA | P12+ STAN | L 0-3 (22-25, 19-25, 24-26) | 1,703 | 7-3 |
| 2/11; 6 p.m. | #1 Hawai'i | #8 | Burnham Pavilion & Ford Center; Stanford, CA | P12+ STAN | L 0-3 (25-27, 19-25, 19-25) | 1,336 | 7-4 |
| 2/17; 7 p.m. | #7 Pepperdine* | #9 | Burnham Pavilion & Ford Center; Stanford, CA | P12+ STAN | L 0-3 (19-25, 16-25, 22-25) | 532 | 7-5 (0-1) |
| 2/18; 5 p.m. | #7 Pepperdine* | #9 | Maples Pavilion; Stanford, CA | P12 BAY | W 3-2 (20-25, 25-20, 25-17, 23-25, 15-12) | 868 | 8-5 (1-1) |
| 2/24; 7 p.m. | @ #13 USC* | #9 | Galen Center; Los Angeles, CA | P12 LA | W 3-1 (25-22, 24-26, 25-16, 25-20) | 392 | 9-5 (2-1) |
| 2/26; 4 p.m. | @ #13 USC* | #9 | Galen Center; Los Angeles, CA | P12, P12 LA | L 2-3' (19-25, 25-18, 24-26, 25-22, 15-17) | 559 | 9-6 (2-2) |
| 3/3; 5 p.m. | #14 CSUN | #10 | Maples Pavilion; Stanford, CA | P12+ STAN | L 0-3' (20-25, 23-25, 24-26) | 436 | 9-7 |
| 3/4; 3 p.m. | #6 UC Irvine | #10 | Maples Pavilion; Stanford, CA | P12+ STAN | L 0-3' (17-25, 23-25, 22-25) | 793 | 9-8 |
| 3/17; 7 p.m. | #3 UCLA* | #10 | Burnham Pavilion & Ford Center; Stanford, CA | P12+ STAN | L 0-3' (12-25, 12-25, 12-25) | 839 | 9-9 (2-3) |
| 3/18; 5 p.m. | #3 UCLA* | #10 | Burnham Pavilion & Ford Center; Stanford, CA | P12+ STAN | L 0-3' (18-25, 21-25, 20-25) | 908 | 9-10 (2-4) |
| 3/31; 7 p.m. | Concordia Irvine* | #9 | Maples Pavilion; Stanford, CA | P12+ STAN | W 3-0' (25-14, 25-18, 25-15) | 296 | 10-10 (3-4) |
| 4/1; 7 p.m. | Concordia Irvine* | #9 | Maples Pavilion; Stanford, CA | P12+ STAN | W 3-0 (25-21, 25-16, 25-20) | 412 | 11-10 (4-4) |
| 4/7; 7 p.m. | #6 Grand Canyon* | #9 | Maples Pavilion; Stanford, CA | P12+ STAN | W 3-0 (25-17, 25-17, 25-20) | 612 | 12-10 (5-4) |
| 4/8; 6 p.m. | #6 Grand Canyon* | #9 | Maples Pavilion; Stanford, CA | P12+ STAN | W 3-2 (25-21, 24-26, 25-18, 22-25, 15-10) | 724 | 13-10 (6-4) |
| 4/14; 6 p.m. | @ #6 BYU* | #8 | Smith Fieldhouse; Provo, UT | BYUtv | L 1-3 (20-25, 25-19, 21-25, 24-26) | 4,358 | 13-11 (6-5) |
| 4/15; 6 p.m. | @ #6 BYU* | #8 | Smith Fieldhouse; Provo, UT | BYUtv | L 0-3 (22-25, 23-25, 19-25) | | 13-12 (6-6) |
| 4/19; 5:35 p.m. | #12 USC^{(6)} | #8^{(3)} | Maples Pavilion; Stanford, CA (MPSF Quarterfinal) | FloVolleyball | W 3-0 (21-25, 25-21, 26-24, 25-15) | 706 | 14-12 |
| 4/20; 7:05 p.m. | #6 BYU^{(2)} | #8^{(3)} | Maples Pavilion; Stanford, CA (MPSF Semifinal) | FloVolleyball | W 3-2 (25-20, 23-25, 25-22, 22-25, 15-12) | 617 | 15-12 |
| 4/22; 6:05 p.m. | #2 UCLA^{(1)} | #8^{(3)} | Maples Pavilion; Stanford, CA (MPSF Championship) | FloVolleyball | | | |

*-Indicates conference match.
Times listed are Pacific Time Zone.

== Announcers for televised games ==
- St. Francis: Tim Swartz & Troy Clardy
- St. Francis: Tim Swartz & Jordan Watkins
- UC Santa Barbara: Troy Clardy
- UC Santa Barbara: Ted Enberg
- Lewis: Rob Espero & Bill Walton
- Penn State: Rob Espero & Bill Walton
- UC Santa Cruz:
- CSUN:
- The Master's:
- Hawai'i:
- Hawai'i:
- Pepperdine:
- Pepperdine:
- USC:
- USC:
- CSUN:
- UC Irvine:
- UCLA:
- UCLA:
- Concordia Irvine:
- Concordia Irvine:
- Grand Canyon:
- Grand Canyon:
- BYU:
- BYU:
- MPSF Quarterfinal:

== Rankings ==
Ranking movements Legend: ██ Increase in ranking ██ Decrease in ranking RV = Received votes
| | Week | | | | | | | | | | | | | | | | | |
| Poll | Pre | 1 | 2 | 3 | 4 | 5 | 6 | 7 | 8 | 9 | 10 | 11 | 12 | 13 | 14 | 15 | 16 | Final |
|---|---|---|---|---|---|---|---|---|---|---|---|---|---|---|---|---|---|---|
| AVCA Coaches | 9 | 8 | 8 | 7 | 6 | 8 | 9 | 9 | 10 | 12 | 10 | 10 | 9 | 9 | 8 | 8 | 8 | 9 |
| Off the Block Media | Not released | | 6 | 7 | 7 | 7 | 9 | 10 | 10 | RV | RV | RV | RV | RV | 9 | RV | | 10 |

^The Media did not release a Pre-season or Week 1 poll.
