= 2023 Pepperdine Waves men's volleyball team =

American college volleyball season

2023 Pepperdine Waves men's volleyball
- Conference: Mountain Pacific Sports Federation
- Record: 16-14 (5-7 MPSF)
- Head coach: Jonathan Winder (1st season)
- Assistant coaches: Matthew Pollock (4th season); Hardy Wooldridge (1st season)
- Home arena: Firestone Fieldhouse

The 2023 Pepperdine Waves men's volleyball team represented Pepperdine University in the 2023 NCAA Division I & II men's volleyball season. The Waves, led by first year head coach Jonathan Winder, played their home games at Firestone Fieldhouse. The Waves were members of the MPSF and were picked to finish second in the preseason poll.

2023 Mountain Pacific Sports Federation men's volleyball standings
	Conf.				Overall
Team	W		L	PCT	W		L	PCT
No. 1 UCLA ‍†‍‡‍^{y}	12	–	0	1.000	31	–	2	.939
No. 8 BYU ‍‍‍	8	–	4	.667	19	–	7	.731
No. 6 Grand Canyon ‍‍‍^{y}	6	–	6	.500	22	–	8	.733
No. 9 Stanford ‍‍‍	6	–	6	.500	15	–	13	.536
No. 10 Pepperdine ‍‍‍	5	–	7	.417	16	–	14	.533
No. 12 USC ‍‍‍	3	–	9	.250	10	–	16	.385
Concordia Irvine ‍‍‍	2	–	10	.167	8	–	19	.296
† – Conference champion ‡ – MPSF tournament champion y – Invited to the NCAA tournament Rankings from AVCA

== Roster ==
2023 Pepperdine Waves roster
Defensive specialist/libero: 3 Trey Cole - Junior; 4 Brendan Read (redshirt) Freshman; 27 Yadiel Diaz - '' (redshirt) Freshman; Middle blockers: 2 Keeton Hanzlik-Green - '' (redshirt) Freshman; 5 Andersen Fuller - Junior; 7 Ethan Watson - Freshman; 8 Nick Tidik - '' (redshirt) Freshman; 11 James Eadie - Freshman; 22 Ryan Wheeler - (redshirt) Junior	Outside hitters: 9 Kevin Roberts - '' (redshirt) Freshman; 14 Callahan Hefner - Freshman; 15 Joe Deluzio - (redshirt) Sophomore; 17 Aidan Tune - Freshman; 19 Cole Rasic - (redshirt) Sophomore; 23 Jaylen Jasper - Graduate; 24 Ryan Barnett - (redshirt) Freshman; 25 Akin Akinwumi - Senior	Opposite hitters: 12 Jacob Steele - (redshirt) Junior; 16 Eli Crane - (redshirt) Sophomore; Setters: 1 Andreas Cardenas-Marouf - Freshman; 6 Bryce Dvorak - Junior

== Schedule ==
TV/Internet Streaming information:

All home games will be televised on WaveCasts. All road games will also be streamed by the schools tv or streaming service. The conference tournament will be streamed by FloVolleyball.

Date time	Opponent	Rank^{(tournament seed)}	Arena city (tournament)	Television	Score	Attendance	Record (MPSF record)
1/4; 7 p.m.	Lincoln Memorial	#5	Firestone Fieldhouse; Malibu, CA	WaveCasts	W 3–0 (25–18, 25–22, 25–20)	307	1–0
1/13; 6 p.m.	The Master's	#5	Firestone Fieldhouse; Malibu, CA	WaveCasts	W 3–0 (25–22, 25–19, 25–23)	782	2-0
1/14; 6 p.m.	Emmanuel	#5	Firestone Fieldhouse; Malibu, CA	WaveCasts	W 3–0 (25–12, 25–12, 25–16)	327	3-0
1/16; 7 p.m.	Princeton	#5	Firestone Fieldhouse; Malibu, CA	WaveCasts	W 3–0 (25–17, 25–23, 25–19)	682	4-0
1/20; 2 p.m.	vs. #4 Penn State	#5	Austin Convention Center; Austin, TX (First Point Men's Volleyball Collegiate Challenge)	Athletes Go Live	L 1-3 (24-26, 18–25, 25–19, 14-25)	1,127	4-1
1/21; 2 p.m.	vs. #15 Lewis	#5	Austin Convention Center; Austin, TX (First Point Men's Volleyball Collegiate Challenge)	Athletes Go Live	W 3–1 (25–21, 29–31, 25–18, 25-20)	863	5-1
1/27; 2 p.m.	vs. NJIT	#5	Recreation Athletic Complex; Fairfax, VA (Uvaldo Acosta Memorial Tournament)		W 3–1 (25–20, 25–19, 24–26, 25-22)	0	6-1
1/28; 2 p.m.	@ George Mason	#5	Recreation Athletic Complex; Fairfax, VA (Uvaldo Acosta Memorial Tournament)	ESPN+	W 3–0 (25–16, 25–19, 25–11)	299	7-1
2/1; 7 p.m.	#15 UC Santa Barbara	#5	Firestone Fieldhouse; Malibu, CA	WaveCasts	W 3–0 (25–23, 25–21, 25–21)	372	8-1
2/3; 7 p.m.	@ #15 UC Santa Barbara	#5	Robertson Gymnasium; Santa Barbara, CA	ESPN+	L 2-3 (25–21, 21–25, 25–16, 11-25, 12-15)	312	8-2
2/8; 7 p.m.	#7 UC Irvine	#6	Firestone Fieldhouse; Malibu, CA	WaveCasts	L 2-3 (27-29, 25-20, 20-25, 29-27, 9-15)	623	8-3
2/10; 7 p.m.	@ #7 UC Irvine	#6	Bren Events Center; Irvine, CA	ESPN+	L 1-3 (20-25, 25-23, 20-25, 17-25)	1,292	8-4
2/17; 7 p.m.	@ #9 Stanford*	#7	Burnham Pavilion & Ford Center; Stanford, CA	P12+ STAN	W 3-0 (25-19, 25-16, 25-22)	532	9-4 (1-0)
2/20; 5 p.m.	@ #9 Stanford*	#7	Maples Pavilion; Stanford, CA	P12 BAY	L 2-3 (25-20, 20-25, 17-25, 25-23, 12-15)	868	9-5 (1-1)
2/22; 6 p.m.	#5 Grand Canyon*	#7	Firestone Fieldhouse; Malibu, CA	WaveCasts	L 2-3 (18-25, 21-25, 25-23, 25-20, 14-16)	437	9-6 (1-2)
2/24; 12 p.m.	#5 Grand Canyon*	#7	Firestone Fieldhouse; Malibu, CA	WaveCasts	W 3-2 (20-25, 23-25, 25-17, 27-25, 15-9)	317	10-6 (2-2)
3/1; 10 p.m.	@ #1 Hawai'i	#7	Stan Sheriff Center; Honolulu, HI	ESPN+	L 1-3 (15-25, 25-22, 22-25, 21-25)	5,059	10-7
3/3; 10 p.m.	@ #1 Hawai'i	#7	Stan Sheriff Center; Honolulu, HI	ESPN+	L 0-3 (19-25, 18-25, 21-25)	7,452	10-8
3/9; 6 p.m.	#10 USC*	#7	Firestone Fieldhouse; Malibu, CA	WaveCasts	W 3-0 (25-17, 25-16, 25-19)	723	11-8 (3-2)
3/11; 7 p.m.	@ #10 USC*	#7	Galen Center; Los Angeles, CA	P12+ USC	W 3-1 (27-25, 17-25, 25-23, 25-20)	493	12-8 (4-2)
3/15; 5 p.m.	Harvard	#7	Firestone Fieldhouse; Malibu, CA	WaveCasts	W 3-0 (25-16, 25-22, 25-15)	583	13-8
3/17; 6 p.m.	Daemen	#7	Firestone Fieldhouse; Malibu, CA	WaveCasts	W 3-0 (25-13, 25-18, 25-17)	379	14-8
3/24; 6 p.m.	@ #8 BYU*	#7	Smith Fieldhouse; Provo, UT	BYUtv	L 2-3 (25-21, 22-25, 25-19, 20-25, 11-15)	4,156	14-9 (4-3)
3/25; 6 p.m.	@ #8 BYU*	#7	Smith Fielhouse; Provo, UT	BYUtv	L 2-3 (25-22, 16-25, 21-25, 25-23, 13-15)	4,325	14-10 (4-4)
4/1; 6 p.m.	Cal Lutheran	#8	Firestone Fieldhouse; Malibu, CA	WaveCasts	W 3-0 (25-16, 25-19, 25-22)	304	15-10
4/6; 7 p.m.	@ Concordia Irvine*	#8	CU Arena; Irvine, CA	EagleEye	L 1-3 (25-18, 17-25, 17-25, 24-26)	81	15-11 (4-5)
4/8; 6 p.m.	Concordia Irvine*	#8	Firestone Fieldhouse; Malibu, CA	WaveCasts	W 3-0 (27-25, 25-18, 25-22)	451	16-11 (5-5)
4/13; 6 p.m.	#2 UCLA*	#9	Firestone Fieldhouse; Malibu, CA	WaveCasts	L 1-3 (32-30, 21-25, 23-25, 23-25)	817	16-12 (5-6)
4/15; 7 p.m.	@ #2 UCLA*	#9	Pauley Pavilion; Los Angeles, CA	P12 LA	L 1-3 (28-26, 20-25, 16-25, 15-25)	3,345	16-13 (5-7)
4/19; 8 p.m.	#7 Grand Canyon^{(4)}	#9^{(5)}	Maples Pavilion; Stanford, CA (MPSF Quarterfinal)	FloVolleyball	L 0-3 (22-25, 17-25, 20-25)	705	16-14

*-Indicates conference match. (#)-Indicates tournament seeding.
Times listed are Pacific Time Zone.

== Announcers for televised games ==
- Lincoln Memorial: Al Epstein
- The Master's: Al Epstein
- Emmanuel: Al Epstein
- Princeton: Al Epstein
- Penn State: Rob Espero & Bill Walton
- Lewis: Rob Espero & Bill Walton
- George Mason:
- UC Santa Barbara:
- UC Santa Barbara:
- UC Irvine:
- UC Irvine:
- Stanford:
- Stanford:
- Grand Canyon:
- Grand Canyon:
- Hawai'i:
- Hawai'i:
- USC:
- USC:
- Harvard:
- Daemen:
- BYU:
- BYU:
- Cal Lutheran:
- Concordia Irvine:
- Concordia Irvine:
- UCLA:
- UCLA:
- MPSF Quarterfinal:

== Rankings ==
Ranking movements Legend: ██ Increase in ranking ██ Decrease in ranking RV = Received votes
	Week																	
Poll	Pre	1	2	3	4	5	6	7	8	9	10	11	12	13	14	15	16	Final
AVCA Coaches	5	5	5	5	5	6	7	7	7	7	7	7	8	8	9	9	10	10
Off the Block Media	Not released		5	6	5	6	8	8	7	8	8	7	8	9	RV	10		RV

^The Media did not release a Pre-season or Week 1 poll.
