= 2023 UCLA Bruins men's volleyball team =

American college volleyball season

2023 UCLA Bruins men's volleyball

NCAA champion MPSF regular season champion MPSF tournament champion

MPSF Championship Game, W 3–0 vs. Stanford

NCAA Championship Game, W 3–1 vs. Hawaii
- Conference: Mountain Pacific Sports Federation
- Record: 31–2 (12–0 MPSF)
- Head coach: John Speraw (11th season)
- Assistant coaches: Nick Vogel (1st season); Brandon Taliaferro (1st season)
- Home arena: Pauley Pavilion; John Wooden Center

The 2023 UCLA men's volleyball team represented University of California, Los Angeles in the 2023 NCAA Division I & II men's volleyball season. The Bruins, led by eleventh year head coach John Speraw, played their home games at Pauley Pavilion and the John Wooden Center (when basketball has the use of Pauley Pavilion). The Bruins were members of the MPSF and were picked to finish first in the MPSF preseason poll.

2023 Mountain Pacific Sports Federation men's volleyball standings
	Conf.				Overall
Team	W		L	PCT	W		L	PCT
No. 1 UCLA ‍†‍‡‍^{y}	12	–	0	1.000	31	–	2	.939
No. 8 BYU ‍‍‍	8	–	4	.667	19	–	7	.731
No. 6 Grand Canyon ‍‍‍^{y}	6	–	6	.500	22	–	8	.733
No. 9 Stanford ‍‍‍	6	–	6	.500	15	–	13	.536
No. 10 Pepperdine ‍‍‍	5	–	7	.417	16	–	14	.533
No. 12 USC ‍‍‍	3	–	9	.250	10	–	16	.385
Concordia Irvine ‍‍‍	2	–	10	.167	8	–	19	.296
† – Conference champion ‡ – MPSF tournament champion y – Invited to the NCAA tournament Rankings from AVCA

== Season highlights ==
- Ethan Champlin won the National Outside Attacker of the Week award for Week 0 games.

== Roster ==
2023 UCLA Bruins roster
Defensive specialist/libero: 4 Troy Gooch - (redshirt) Senior; 14 Matthew Aziz - Sophomore; 23 Coleman McDonough - Freshman; Middle blockers: 2 J.R. Norris IV - (redshirt) Senior; 9 Guy Genis - (redshirt) Sophomore; 10 Sean McQuiggan - (redshirt) Freshman; 13 Merrick McHenry - (redshirt) Junior; 15 Christopher Hersh - Freshman; 22 Matthew Edwards - (redshirt) Freshman	Outside hitters: 3 Cole Ketrzynski - Senior; 11 Cooper Robinson - (redshirt) Freshman; 12 Alex Knight - Senior; 16 Ido David - Sophomore; 18 Grant Sloane - (redshirt) Sophomore; 20 Ethan Champlin - Junior; 21 Zach Rama - Freshman	Opposite hitters: 1 Kyle Vom Steeg - (redshirt) Junior; 3 Cole Ketrzynski - Senior; 16 Ido David - Sophomore; 19 David Decker - Freshman; Setters: 5 Ayrton Garcia-Jurado - (redshirt) Junior; 7 Andrew Rowan - Freshman; 24 Miles Partain - Junior (left on Feb. 9, 2023)

== Schedule ==
TV/Internet Streaming information:

All home games will be televised on Pac-12 Network or Pac-12+. Most road games will also be streamed by the schools streaming service. The conference tournament will be streamed by FloVolleyball.

Date time	Opponent	Rank^{(tournament seed)}	Arena city (tournament)	Television	Score	Attendance	Record (MPSF record)
1/5; 5:30 p.m.	vs. CSUN	#2	Robertson Gymnasium; Santa Barbara, CA (UCSB Asics Invitational)		W 3–0 (25–18, 25–21, 25–18)	146	1–0
1/6; 3 p.m.	vs. UC San Diego	#2	Robertson Gymnasium; Santa Barbara, CA (UCSB Asics Invitational)		W 3–0 (25–18, 25–16, 25–14)	115	2–0
1/7; 8 p.m.	@ #7 UC Santa Barbara	#2	Robertson Gymnasium; Santa Barbara, CA (UCSB Asics Invitational)	ESPN+	W 3–0 (26–24, 25–16, 25–14)	422	3–0
1/13; 6 p.m.	Princeton	#2	John Wooden Center; Los Angeles, CA	P12+ UCLA	W 3–1 (22-25, 25–18, 25–20, 25-14)	721	4-0
1/20; 7 p.m.	#12 UC Santa Barbara	#2	Pauley Pavilion; Los Angeles, CA	P12+ UCLA	W 3–0 (32-30, 25–17, 25–21)	950	5-0
1/21; 7 p.m.	UC San Diego	#2	Pauley Pavilion; Los Angeles, CA	P12 LA	W 3–0 (25-15, 25–23, 25–18)	923	6-0
1/27; 7 p.m.	@ CSUN	#2	Premier America Credit Union Arena; Northridge, CA	ESPN+	W 3–0 (25-18, 25–16, 26–24)	507	7-0
1/31; 5 p.m.	@ George Mason	#2	Recreation Athletic Complex; Fairfax, VA	ESPN+	W 3–0 (25-15, 25–21, 25-19)	455	8-0
2/3; 1 p.m.	vs. #13 Ohio State	#2	Rec Hall; University Park, PA (Pac-12/Big Ten Challenge)		W 3–1 (25-22, 25–20, 23-25, 25-23)		9-0
2/4; 4 p.m.	@ #4 Penn State	#2	Rec Hall; University Park, PA (Pac-12/Big Ten Challenge)	B1G+	L 1–3 (21-25, 25-18, 19-25, 17-25)	0	9-1
2/9; 8 p.m.	#2 Long Beach State	#4	Pauley Pavilion; Los Angeles, CA	P12 LA	W 3-0 (25-19, 25-21, 25-20)	2,245	10-1
2/10; 7 p.m.	@ #2 Long Beach State	#4	Walter Pyramid; Long Beach, CA	ESPN+	W 3-1 (18-25, 25-21, 25-23, 25-23)	4,138	11-1
2/17; 7 p.m.	#8 BYU*	#2	Pauley Pavilion; Los Angeles, CA	P12 LA	W 3-0 (25-20, 25-22, 25-18)	1,432	12-1 (1-0)
2/18; 5 p.m.	#8 BYU*	#2	John Wooden Center; Los Angeles, CA	P12+ UCLA	W 3-0 (25-17, 25-21, 25-18)	1,012	13-1 (2-0)
2/24; 7 p.m.	@ #6 UC Irvine	#2	Bren Events Center; Irvine, CA	ESPN+	W 3-1 (17-25, 25-23, 25-19, 25-16)	2,411	14-1
2/26; 5 p.m.	#6 UC Irvine	#2	Pauley Pavilion; Los Angeles, CA	P12+ UCLA	W 3-1 (20-25, 25-22, 25-16, 27-25)	1,306	15-1
3/1; 7 p.m.	Concordia Irvine*	#2	Pauley Pavlion; Los Angeles, CA	P12+ UCLA	W 3-0 (25-16, 25-16, 25-14)	798	16-1 (3-0)
3/3; 7 p.m.	@ Concordia Irvine*	#2	CU Arena; Irvine, CA	EagleEye	W 3-0 (25-15, 25-19, 25-16)	82	17-1 (4-0)
3/9; 7 p.m.	vs. #3 Penn State	#2	Stan Sheriff Center; Honolulu, HI (Outrigger Volleyball invitational)		W 3-2 (25-20, 25-22, 16-25, 21-25, 15-10)	0	18-1
3/10; 7 p.m.	Purdue Fort Wayne	#2	Stan Sheriff Center; Honolulu, HI (Outrigger Volleyball Invitational)		W 3-0 (25-20, 25-21, 25-16)	0	19-1
3/11; 10 p.m.	@ #1 Hawai'i	#2	Stan Sheriff Center; Honolulu, HI (Outrigger Volleyball Invitational)	ESPN+	L 1-3 (27-29, 25-21, 22-25, 26-28)	10,300	19-2
3/17; 5 p.m.	@ #10 Stanford*	#3	Burnham Pavilion & Ford Center; Stanford, CA	P12+ STAN	W 3-0 (25-12, 25-12, 25-12)	839	20-2 (5-0)
3/18; 5 p.m.	@ #10 Stanford*	#3	Burnham Pavilion & Ford Center; Stanford, CA	P12+ STAN	W 3-0 (25-18, 25-21, 25-20)	908	21-2 (6-0)
3/31; 6 p.m.	@ #5 Grand Canyon*	#2	GCU Arena; Phoenix, AZ	ESPN+	W 3-1 (29-31, 27-25, 25-20, 25-13)	1,821	22-2 (7-0)
4/1; 6 p.m.	@ #5 Grand Canyon*	#2	GCU Arena; Phoenix, AZ	ESPN+	W 3-0 (30-28, 25-21, 25-19)	1,563	23-2 (8-0)
4/6; 7 p.m.	#12 USC*	#2	Pauley Pavilion; Los Angeles, CA	P12 LA	W 3-0 (25-22, 25-17, 25-22)	3,072	24–2 (9-0)
4/8; 7 p.m.	@ #12 USC*	#2	Galen Center; Los Angeles, CA	P12 LA	W 3-0 (25-20, 25-17, 25-20)	1,614	25–2 (10-0)
4/13; 7 p.m.	@ #9 Pepperdine*	#2	Firestone Fieldhouse; Malibu, CA	WCC Net	W 3-1 (30-32, 21-25, 23-25, 23-25)	817	26–2 (11-0)
4/15; 7 p.m.	#9 Pepperdine*	#2	Pauley Pavilion; Los Angeles, CA	P12 LA	W 3-1 (26-28, 25-20, 25-16, 25-15)	3,345	27–2 (12-0)
4/19; 4:30 p.m.	#7 Grand Canyon^{(4)}	#2^{(1)}	Maples Pavilion; Stanford, CA (MPSF Semifinal)	FloVolleyball	W 3-0 (25-23, 25-19, 25-20)	457	28-2
4/22; 6:05 p.m.	@ #8 Stanford^{(3)}	#2^{(1)}	Maples Pavilion; Stanford, CA (MPSF Championship)	FloVolleyball	W 3-0 (25-22, 25-21, 25-23)	1,721	29-2
5/4; 2 p.m.	#4 Long Beach State	#2 ^{(1)}	EagleBank Arena; Fairfax, VA (NCAA Semifinal)	NCAA.com	W 3–0 (25–16, 25-14, 25-19)		30-2
5/6; 2 p.m.	#1 Hawai'i ^{(2)}	#2 ^{(1)}	EagleBank Arena; Fairfax, VA (NCAA Championship)	ESPN2	W 3–1 (28-26, 31-33, 25-21, 25-21)	6,942	31-2

*-Indicates conference match. (#)-Indicates tournament seeding.
Times listed are Pacific Time Zone. Rank – American Volleyball Coaches Association (AVCA) Men's Division I-II Coaches Poll. (#) Tournament seedings in parentheses.

== Announcers for televised games ==
- UC Santa Barbara: Max Kelton & Katie Spieler
- Princeton: Denny Cline
- UC Santa Barbara: Denny Cline
- UC San Diego:
- CSUN:
- George Mason:
- Ohio State:
- Penn State:
- Long Beach State:
- Long Beach State:
- BYU:
- BYU: Denny Cline
- UC Irvine:
- UC Irvine:
- Concordia Irvine:
- Concordia Irvine:
- Hawai'i:
- Stanford:
- Stanford:
- Grand Canyon:
- Grand Canyon:
- USC:
- USC:
- Pepperdine:
- Pepperdine:
- MPSF Tournament:

== Rankings ==
Ranking movements Legend: ██ Increase in ranking ██ Decrease in ranking
	Week																	
Poll	Pre	1	2	3	4	5	6	7	8	9	10	11	12	13	14	15	16	Final
AVCA Coaches	2	2	2	2	2	4	2	2	2	2	3	3	2	2	2	2	2	1
Off the Block Media	Not released		2	2	2	4	2	2	2	2	3	2	1	1	1	1		1

- The media did not release a Pre-season or Week 1 poll.
