= 2023 Concordia Golden Eagles men's volleyball team =

American college volleyball season

2023 Concordia Golden Eagles men's volleyball
- Conference: Mountain Pacific Sports Federation
- Record: 8–19 (2–10 MPSF)
- Head coach: Riley Salmon (2nd season)
- Assistant coach: Chris Seiffert (1st season)
- Home arena: CU Arena

The 2023 Concordia Golden Eagles men's volleyball team represented Concordia University Irvine in the 2023 NCAA Division I & II men's volleyball season. The Eagles, led by second year head coach Riley Salmon, played their home games at CU Arena. The Eagles were members of the MPSF and were picked to finish seventh in the MPSF preseason poll.

2023 Mountain Pacific Sports Federation men's volleyball standings
	Conf.				Overall
Team	W		L	PCT	W		L	PCT
No. 1 UCLA ‍†‍‡‍^{y}	12	–	0	1.000	31	–	2	.939
No. 8 BYU ‍‍‍	8	–	4	.667	19	–	7	.731
No. 6 Grand Canyon ‍‍‍^{y}	6	–	6	.500	22	–	8	.733
No. 9 Stanford ‍‍‍	6	–	6	.500	15	–	13	.536
No. 10 Pepperdine ‍‍‍	5	–	7	.417	16	–	14	.533
No. 12 USC ‍‍‍	3	–	9	.250	10	–	16	.385
Concordia Irvine ‍‍‍	2	–	10	.167	8	–	19	.296
† – Conference champion ‡ – MPSF tournament champion y – Invited to the NCAA tournament Rankings from AVCA

== Roster ==
2023 Concordia Golden Eagles roster
Defensive specialist/libero: 6 Jacob Reilly - Freshman; 8 Cruse Ae'a - (redshirt) Sophomore; 14 Danny Smithers - Sophomore; Middle blockers: 1 Max McCullough - Sophomore; 2 Gil Herold - Senior; 10 Viktor Berg - Sophomore; 12 Mason Mullins - (redshirt) Senior; 16 Cole Vigo - Graduate; 19 Dylan Friedl - Freshman; 27 Marc Kramer - Junior; 31 Wolf Beeuwsaert - Sophomore	Outside hitters: 3 Connor Dell - Freshman; 4 Buddy Mulder - Freshman; 11 Kobe Kiley - Sophomore; 18 Gage Doble - Freshman; 20 Liam Roberts - (redshirt) Sophomore; 21 Hunter Brandenburg - Freshman; 22 Johnny Anselmo - (redshirt) Sophomore; 26 Riley Gapp -Freshman; 30 Slater Fuhrman - Sophomore; 42 Scott Montez - Freshman	Opposite hitters: 3 Connor Dell - Freshman; 26 Riley Gapp -Freshman; 32 Asa Holmes - Freshman; 35 Uriel Batista - Senior; Setters: 5 Christian Oviedo - (redshirt) Junior; 7 Makai Lipson - Sophomore; 9 Keegan Au Yuen - Freshman; 13 Gehrig Tolman - Freshman; 23 Nathan Biteau - Graduate

== Schedule ==
TV/Internet Streaming information:

All home games will be streamed on EagleEye streaming page, powered by Stretch Internet. Most road games will also be streamed by the schools streaming service. The conference tournament will be streamed by FloVolleyball.

Date time	Opponent	Rank^{(tournament seed)}	Arena city (tournament)	Television	Score	Attendance	Record (MPSF record)
1/3; 7 p.m.	Keyano		CU Arena; Irvine, CA	EagleEye	W 3–0 (30–28, 25–23, 25–14)	105	1–0
1/11; 7 p.m.	Vanguard		CU Arena; Irvine, CA	EagleEye	W 3–0 (25-23, 25–22, 25–21)	77	2–0
1/18; 5 p.m.	Princeton		CU Arena; Irvine, CA	EagleEye	L 1–3 (23-25, 26-28, 25–19, 17-25)	117	2-1
1/19; 7 p.m.	Menlo		CU Arena; Irvine, CA	EagleEye	W 3–1 (24-26, 25–17, 25–23, 25-17)	78	3-1
1/20; 7 p.m.	@ #7 UC Irvine		Bren Events Center; Irvine, CA	ESPN+	L 0–3 (21-25, 18-25, 16–25)	702	3-2
1/21; 7 p.m.	#7 UC Irvine		CU Arena; Irvine, CA	EagleEye	L 0–3 (17-25, 20-25, 7–25)	112	3-3
2/2; 7 p.m.	#12 Loyola Chicago		CU Arena; Irvine, CA	EagleEye	W 3–1 (25-22, 25–16, 22–25, 25-21)	120	4-3
2/9; 7 p.m.	Benedictine Mesa		CU Arena; Irvine, CA	EagleEye	L 2-3 (16-25, 25-22, 18-25, 25-17, 11-15)	94	4-4
2/10; 7 p.m.	The Master's		CU Arena; Irvine, CA	EagleEye	L 1-3 (25-19, 21-25, 26-28, 19-25)	187	4-5
2/16; 9 p.m.	@ #1 Hawai'i		Stan Sheriff Center; Honolulu, HI	ESPN+	L 1-3 (14-25, 25-22, 15-25, 23-25)	4,920	4-6
2/17; 9 p.m.	@ #1 Hawai'i		Stan Sheriff Center; Honolulu, HI	ESPN+	L 0-3 (20-25, 19-25, 19-25)	5,381	4-7
2/21; 7 p.m.	UC San Diego		CU Arena; Irvine, CA	EagleEye	W 3-1 (25-23, 22-25, 25-15, 25-21)	126	5-7
2/24; 7 p.m.	#8 BYU*		CU Arena; Irvine, CA	EagleEye	L 0-3 (18-25, 19-25, 18-25)	323	5-8 (0-1)
2/25; 7 p.m.	#8 BYU*		CU Arena; Irvine, CA	EagleEye	L 2-3 (26-24, 24-26, 25-19, 29-31, 12-15)	421	5-9 (0-2)
3/1; 7 p.m.	@ #2 UCLA*		Pauley Pavilion; Los Angeles, CA	P12+ UCLA	L 0-3 (16-25, 16-25, 14-25)	798	5-10 (0-3)
3/3; 7 p.m.	#2 UCLA*		CU Arena; Irvine, CA	EagleEye	L 0-3 (15-25, 19-25, 16-25)	82	5-11 (0-4)
3/4; 2 p.m.	#3 Penn State		CU Arena; Irvine, CA	EagleEye	L 0-3 (19-25, 38-40, 20-25)	111	5-12
3/15; 7 p.m.	Daemen		CU Arena; Irvine, CA	EagleEye	W 3-0 (25-19, 25-19, 25-22)	182	6-12
3/24; 7 p.m.	@ #5 Grand Canyon*		GCU Arena; Phoenix, AZ	ESPN+	W 3-2 (25-23, 25-23, 25-27, 12-25, 15-9)	756	7-12 (1-4)
3/25; 7 p.m.	@ #5 Grand Canyon*		GCU Arena; Phoenix, AZ	ESPN+	L 0-3 (35-37, 22-25, 16-25)	812	7-13 (1-5)
3/31; 7 p.m.	@ #9 Stanford*		Maples Pavilion; Stanford, CA	P12+ STAN	L 0-3 (14-25, 18-25, 15-25)	296	7-14 (1-6)
4/1; 7 p.m.	@ #9 Stanford*		Maples Pavilion; Stanford, CA	P12+ STAN	L 0-3 (21-25, 16-25, 20-25)	412	7-15 (1-7)
4/6; 7 p.m.	#8 Pepperdine*		CU Arena; Irvine, CA	EagleEye	W 3-1 (18-25, 25-17, 25-17, 26-24)	81	8-15 (2-7)
4/8; 6 p.m.	@ #8 Pepperdine*		Firestone Fieldhouse; Malibu, CA	WavesCast	L 0-3 (25-27, 18-25, 22-25)	451	8-16 (2-8)
4/13; 7 p.m.	#13 USC*		CU Arena; Irvine, CA	EagleEye	L 2-3 (20-25, 18-25, 25-22, 25-23, 12-15)	113	8-17 (2-9)
4/15; 7 p.m.	@ #13 USC*		Galen Center; Los Angeles, CA	P12+ USC	L 0-3 (22-25, 15-25, 21-25)	304	8-18 (2-10)
4/19; 3:05 p.m.	#6 BYU^{(2)}	^{(7)}	Maples Pavilion; Stanford, CA (MPSF Quarterfinal)	FloVolleyball	L 1-3 (25-20, 23-25, 18-25, 15-25)	505	8-19

*-Indicates conference match.
Times listed are Pacific Time Zone.

== Announcers for televised games ==
- Keyano: Jon O'Neill
- Vanguard: Jeff Runyan
- Princeton: Jeff Runyan
- Menlo: Jeff Runyan
- UC Irvine: Robbie Loya & Charlie Brande
- UC Irvine: Jeff Runyan
- Loyola Chicago:
- Benedictine Mesa:
- Master's:
- Hawai'i:
- Hawai'i:
- UC San Diego:
- BYU:
- BYU:
- UCLA:
- UCLA:
- Penn State:
- Daemen:
- Grand Canyon:
- Grand Canyon:
- Stanford:
- Stanford:
- Pepperdine:
- Pepperdine:
- USC:
- USC:
- MPSF Quarterfinal:

== Rankings ==
Ranking movements Legend: RV = Received votes
	Week																	
Poll	Pre	1	2	3	4	5	6	7	8	9	10	11	12	13	14	15	16	Final
AVCA Coaches															RV			
Off the Block Media	Not released																	

^The Media did not release a Pre-season or Week 1 poll.
