= 2023 George Mason Patriots men's volleyball team =

2023 George Mason Patriots men's volleyball
- Conference: Eastern Intercollegiate Volleyball Association
- Record: 12–14 (4–6 EIVA)
- Head coach: Jay Hosack (7th season)
- Assistant coach: Joe Norton (7th season)
- Home arena: Recreation Athletic Complex

2023 Eastern Intercollegiate Volleyball Association standings
	Conf.				Overall
Team	W		L	PCT	W		L	PCT
No. 3 Penn State ‍†‍‡‍^{y}	10	–	0	1.000	27	–	4	.871
No. 14 Princeton ‍‍‍	7	–	3	.700	14	–	12	.538
Charleston (WV) ‍‍‍	5	–	5	.500	22	–	7	.759
George Mason ‍‍‍	4	–	6	.400	13	–	14	.481
Harvard ‍‍‍	2	–	8	.200	9	–	16	.360
NJIT ‍‍‍	2	–	8	.200	9	–	18	.333
† – Conference champion ‡ – EIVA tournament champion y – Invited to the NCAA tournament Rankings from AVCA

The 2023 George Mason Patriots men's volleyball team representsed George Mason University in the 2023 NCAA Division I & II men's volleyball season. The Patriots, led by seventh year head coach Jay Hosack, played their home games at Recreation Athletic Complex. The Patriots were members of the Eastern Intercollegiate Volleyball Association and were picked to finish sixth in the EIVA preseason poll.

Additionally George Mason entered the 2023 season with the knowledge that they would host the 2023 NCAA Men's Volleyball Tournament. Unlike the regular season, the tournament games were played at EagleBank Arena so more fans could attend.

== Roster ==
2023 George Mason Patriots Roster
Defensive Specialist/Libero: 2 Bobby Fowler - Sophomore; 12 Paul Wyszynski - Freshman; Middle Blockers: 1 Brandon Leary - Sophomore; 6 Lucas Little - Sophomore; 15 Jason Ashenfelter - Junior; 21 Evan Snodgrass - Freshman; 22 Eamonn Testerman - (redshirt) Junior; 23 Sam Peters - Junior	Outside Hitters: 3 Chey Cooper - (redshirt) Junior; 5 Paul Russell - Sophomore; 9 Dan Shanley - Freshman; 10 Liam French - Sophomore; 13 Omar Hoyos - Junior; 18 Hayden Karpinski - Freshman; 19 Colin Heath - Junior	Opposite Hitters: 17 Jack Bolz - (redshirt) Junior; Setters: 2 Bobby Fowler - Sophomore; 4 Troy McDonald - Sophomore; 11 Georgi Zahariev - Freshman; 14 Zach Talamoa - (redshirt) Senior

== Schedule ==
Date Time	Opponent	Rank	Arena City (Tournament)	Television	Score	Attendance	Record (EIVA Record)
1/13; 7 p.m.	#9 Grand Canyon		Recreation Athletic Complex; Fairfax, VA (Patriot Invitational)	ESPN+	L 0-3 (20–25, 18–25, 16–25)	293	0–1
1/15; 3 p.m.	#14 Ohio State		Recreation Athletic Complex; Fairfax, VA (Patriot Invitational)	ESPN+	L 1-3 (17–25, 16–25, 27–25, 24–26)	413	0-2
1/19; 7 p.m.	LIU		Recreation Athletic Complex; Fairfax, VA (East/West Coast Challenge)	ESPN+	L 1-3 (22–25, 23–25, 28–26, 19–25)	187	0-3
1/21; 5 p.m.	#3 Long Beach State		Recreation Athletic Complex; Fairfax, VA (East/West Coast Challenge)	ESPN+	L 0-3 (17–25, 14–25, 16–25)	586	0-4
1/26; 7 p.m.	NJIT*		Recreation Athletic Complex; Fairfax, VA (Uvaldo Acosta Memorial Tournament)	ESPN+	L 2-3 (25–18, 16–25, 25–21, 23–25, 14–16)	211	0-5 (0–1)
1/28; 5 p.m.	#5 Pepperdine		Recreation Athletic Complex; Fairfax, VA (Uvaldo Acosta Memorial Tournament)	ESPN+	L 0-3 (16–25, 19–25, 11–25)	299	0-6
1/31; 7 p.m.	#2 UCLA		Recreation Athletic Complex; Fairfax, VA	ESPN+	L 0-3 (15–25, 21–25, 19–25)	455	0-7
2/03; 7 p.m.	#14 Lewis		Recreation Athletic Complex; Fairfax, VA (DC Challenge)	ESPN+	W 3-0 (25–18, 25–23, 25–19)	176	1-7
2/04; 7:30 p.m.	Purdue Fort Wayne		Recreation Athletic Complex; Fairfax, VA (DC Challenge)	ESPN+	L 2-3 (25–20, 22–25, 31–29, 22–25, 15–17)	237	1-8
2/18; 5 p.m.	King		Recreation Athletic Complex; Fairfax, VA	ESPN+	W 3-0 (25–15, 25–16, 25–17)	0	2-8
2/24; 7 p.m.	#14 Charleston (WV)*		Recreation Athletic Complex; Fairfax, VA	ESPN+	L 2-3 (25–18, 29–27, 21–25, 22–25, 12–15)	232	2-9 (0–2)
2/25; 5 p.m.	#14 Charleston (WV)*		Recreation Athletic Complex; Fairfax, VA	ESPN+	W 3-0 (25–21, 25–18, 25–22)	363	3-9 (1–2)
3/03; 7 p.m.	North Greenville		Recreation Athletic Complex; Fairfax, VA	ESPN+	W 3-0 (25–16, 25–19, 25–22)	195	4-9
3/04; 5 p.m.	Barton		Recreation Athletic Complex; Fairfax, VA	ESPN+	W 3-1 (25–19, 25–14, 24–26, 25–16)	141	5-9
3/10; 7 p.m.	Limestone		Recreation Athletic Complex; Fairfax, VA	ESPN+	W 3-0 (25–19, 25–22, 25–21)	368	6-9
3/11; 3 p.m.	Limestone		Recreation Athletic Complex; Fairfax, VA	ESPN+	W 3-1 (23–25, 25–18, 25–21, 28–26)	85	7-9
3/17; 7 p.m.	Fairleigh Dickinson		Recreation Athletic Complex; Fairfax, VA	ESPN+	W 3-1 (25–19, 28–26, 23–25, 25–20)	151	8-9
3/18; 5 p.m.	Fairleigh Dickinson		Recreation Athletic Complex; Fairfax, VA	ESPN+	W 3-0 (25–21, 25–19, 25–21)	196	9-9
3/21; 6 p.m.	@ NJIT*		Wellness and Events Center; Newark, NJ	ESPN+	L 0-3 (20–25, 12–25, 22–25)	339	9-10 (1–3)
3/24; 7 p.m.	Princeton*		Recreation Athletic Complex; Fairfax, VA (EIVA/A10 Challenge)		L 1-3 (20–25, 25–21, 20–25, 17–25)	289	9-11 (1–4)
3/26; 3 p.m.	#10 Loyola Chicago		Recreation Athletic Complex; Fairfax, VA (EIVA/A10 Challenge)	ESPN+	L 2-3 (23–25, 25–18, 21–25, 29–27, 15–17)	455	9-12
4/01; 5 p.m.	@ Princeton*		Dillon Gymnasium; Princeton, NJ	ESPN+	W 3-0 (25–22, 25–22, 25–18)	0	10-12 (2–4)
4/07; 7 p.m.	#3 Penn State*		Recreation Athletic Complex; Fairfax, VA	ESPN+	L 0-3 (20–25, 20–25, 15–25)	482	10-13 (2–5)
4/08; 3 p.m.	#3 Penn State*		Recreation Athletic Complex; Fairfax, VA	ESPN+	L 0-3 (20–25, 17–25, 20–25)	449	10-14 (2–6)
4/14; 7 p.m.	@ Harvard*		Malkin Athletic Center; Cambridge, MA	ESPN+	W 3-0 (25–22, 25–21, 25–20)	162	11-14 (3–6)
4/15; 5 p.m.	@ Harvard*		Malkin Athletic Center; Cambridge, MA	ESPN+	W 3-1 (25–15, 23–25, 25–19, 25–23)	147	12-14 (4–6)

*-Indicates conference match.
Times listed are Eastern Time Zone.

== Broadcasters ==
- Grand Canyon: Josh Yourish
- Ohio State: Jon Linney
- LIU: Josh Yourish
- Long Beach State:
- NJIT:
- Pepperdine:
- UCLA:
- Lewis:
- Purdue Fort Wayne:
- NJIT:
- King:
- Charleston (WV):
- Charleston (WV):
- North Greenville:
- Barton :
- Limestone:
- Limestone:
- Fairleigh Dickinson:
- Fairleigh Dickinson:
- Princeton:
- Loyola Chicago:
- Princeton:
- Penn State:
- Penn State:
- Harvard:
- Harvard:

== Rankings ==
Ranking movements
	Week																	
Poll	Pre	1	2	3	4	5	6	7	8	9	10	11	12	13	14	15	16	Final
AVCA Coaches																		
Off the Block Media	Not released																	

^The Media did not release a Pre-season poll.

== Honors ==
To be filled in upon completion of the season.
