= 2023 USC Trojans men's volleyball team =

American college volleyball season

2023 USC Trojans men's volleyball
- Conference: Mountain Pacific Sports Federation
- Record: 10–16 (3–9 MPSF)
- Head coach: Jeff Nygaard (8th season)
- Assistant coaches: Gary Sato (8th season); Rory Prager (4th season)
- Home arena: Galen Center

The 2023 USC Trojans men's volleyball team represented the University of Southern California in the 2023 NCAA Division I & II men's volleyball season. The Trojans, led by eighth year head coach Jeff Nygaard, played their home games at Galen Center. The Trojans are members of the MPSF and were picked to finish fourth in the MPSF preseason poll.

2023 Mountain Pacific Sports Federation men's volleyball standings
	Conf.				Overall
Team	W		L	PCT	W		L	PCT
No. 1 UCLA ‍†‍‡‍^{y}	12	–	0	1.000	31	–	2	.939
No. 8 BYU ‍‍‍	8	–	4	.667	19	–	7	.731
No. 6 Grand Canyon ‍‍‍^{y}	6	–	6	.500	22	–	8	.733
No. 9 Stanford ‍‍‍	6	–	6	.500	15	–	13	.536
No. 10 Pepperdine ‍‍‍	5	–	7	.417	16	–	14	.533
No. 12 USC ‍‍‍	3	–	9	.250	10	–	16	.385
Concordia Irvine ‍‍‍	2	–	10	.167	8	–	19	.296
† – Conference champion ‡ – MPSF tournament champion y – Invited to the NCAA tournament Rankings from AVCA

== Roster ==
2023 USC Trojans roster
Defensive specialist/libero: 3 Austin Stuard – Sophomore; Middle blockers: 17 Teddy Terrill – Sophomore; 18 Christian Thomas – (redshirt) Sophomore; 19 Lucas Frassrand – Senior; 20 Markus Olsson – Sophomore	Outside hitters: 1 Dillon Klein – Freshman; 2 Noah Roberts – Freshman; 4 Jackson Reed – Junior; 9 George Dyer – Senior; 12 Riley Haine – Freshman; 15 Jack Deuchar – Junior; 23 Peter Brown – Junior	Opposite hitters: 8 Kyle Paulson – Junior; 14 Luke Hobus – Sophomore; 19 Lucas Frassrand – Senior; 21 Kevin Kobrine – (redshirt) Senior; 24 Simon Gallas – (redshirt) Junior; Setters: 6 Trevor Powell – Freshman; 7 Ryan Sprague – Freshman; 8 Kyle Paulson – Junior; 13 Nate Tennant – Junior

== Schedule ==
TV/Internet Streaming information:

All home games will be televised on Pac-12 Network or streamed on Pac-12+ USC. Most road games will also be streamed by the schools streaming service. The conference tournament will be streamed by FloVolleyball.

Date time	Opponent	Rank^{(tournament seed)}	Arena city (tournament)	Television	Score	Attendance	Record (MPSF record)
1/5; 3 p.m.	@ #11 UC Santa Barbara	#10	Robertson Gymnasium; Santa Barbara, CA (UCSB Asics Invitational)	Vimeo	L 1–3 (25–19, 16–25, 18–25, 23–25)	542	0–1
1/6; 8 p.m.	vs. CSUN	#10	Robertson Gymnasium; Santa Barbara, CA (UCSB Asics Invitational)		W 3–0 (25–21, 28–26, 25–20)	92	1–1
1/7; 5:30 p.m.	vs. UC San Diego	#10	Robertson Gymnasium; Santa Barbara, CA (UCSB Asics Invitational)		W 3–2 (22–25, 20–25, 25–16, 25–22, 15–12)	212	2–1
1/13; 5 p.m.	vs. Lindenwood	#11	Walter Pyramid; Long Beach, CA		W 3–0 (25–16, 25–21, 25–16)		3-1
1/14; 4 p.m.	vs. King	#11	Walter Pyramid; Long Beach, CA		W 3–0 (25–16, 25–17, 25–16)	416	4-1
1/18; 7 p.m.	@ #7 UC Irvine	#10	Bren Events Center; Irvine, CA	ESPN+	L 2-3 (22-25, 27–25, 25–23, 20-25, 11-15)	1,534	4-2
1/19; 7 p.m.	#12 UC Santa Barbara	#10	Galen Center; Los Angeles, CA	P12+ USC	W 3-2 (21-25, 25–22, 25–22, 18-25, 15-12)	1,508	5-2
1/25; 7 p.m.	@ CSUN	#10	Premier America Credit Union Arena; Northridge, CA	ESPN+	W 3-1 (25-22, 19–25, 25–16, 25-17)	422	6-2
2/03; 4 p.m.	@ #4 Penn State	#10	Rec Hall; University Park, PA (Pac-12/Big Ten Challenge)	B1G+	L 1-3 (28-30, 20–25, 25–23, 18-25)	1,177	6-3
2/04; 1 p.m.	vs. #13 Ohio State	#10	Rec Hall; University Park, PA (Pac-12/Big Ten Challenge)		L 1-3 (19-25, 25–20, 20–25, 18-25)	0	6-4
2/15; 7 p.m.	#5 Grand Canyon*	#12	Galen Center; Los Angeles, CA	P12	L 1-3 (21-25, 22–25, 28–26, 22-25)	400	6-5 (0-1)
2/17; 7 p.m.	#5 Grand Canyon*	#12	Galen Center; Los Angeles, CA	P12+ USC	L 1-3 (25-21, 22-25, 20-25, 22-25)	562	6-6 (0-2)
2/24; 7 p.m.	#9 Stanford*	#13	Galen Center; Los Angeles, CA	P12 LA	L 1-3 (22-25, 26-24, 16-25, 20-25)	392	6-7 (0-3)
2/26; 4 p.m.	#9 Stanford*	#13	Galen Center; Los Angeles, CA	P12	W 3-2 (25-19, 18-25, 26-24, 22-25, 17-15)	559	7-7 (1-3)
3/03; 5 p.m.	Menlo	#11	Galen Center; Los Angeles, CA	P12+ USC	W 3-1 (25-20, 23-25, 25-17, 25-20)	201	8-7
3/09; 6 p.m.	@ #7 Pepperdine*	#10	Firestone Fieldhouse; Malibu, CA	WavesCast	L 0-3 (17-25, 16-25, 19-25)	723	8-8 (1-4)
3/11; 7 p.m.	#7 Pepperdine*	#10	Galen Center; Los Angeles, CA	P12+ USC	L 1-3 (25-27, 25-17, 23-25, 20-25)	493	8-9 (1-5)
3/24; 7 p.m.	@ #4 Long Beach State	#11	Walter Pyramid; Long Beach, CA	ESPN+	L 0-3 (17-25, 15-25, 23-25)	2,814	8-10
3/25; 7 p.m.	#4 Long Beach State	#11	Galen Center; Los Angeles, CA	P12+ USC	L 1-3 (13-25, 25-14, 25-27, 21-25)	876	8-11
3/30; 6 p.m.	@ #7 BYU*	#11	Smith Fieldhouse; Provo, UT	BYUtv	L 1-3 (21-25, 25-22, 17-25, 20-25)	3,283	8-12 (1-6)
3/31; 6 p.m.	@ #7 BYU*	#11	Smith Fieldhouse; Provo, UT	BYUtv	L 1-3 (20-25, 28-30, 26-24, 14-25)	4,261	8-13 (1-7)
4/06; 7 p.m.	@ #2 UCLA*	#12	Pauley Pavilion; Los Angeles, CA	P12 LA	L 0-3 (22-25, 17-25, 22-25)	3,072	8–14 (1-8)
4/08; 7 p.m.	#2 UCLA*	#12	Galen Center; Los Angeles, CA	P12 LA	L 0-3 (20-25, 17-25, 20-25)	1,614	8–15 (1-9)
4/13; 7 p.m.	@ Concordia Irvine*	#13	CU Center; Irvine, CA	EagleEye	W 3-2 (25-20, 25-18, 22-25, 23-25, 15-12)	113	9–15 (2-9)
4/15; 7 p.m.	Concordia Irvine*	#13	Galen Center; Los Angeles, CA	P12+ USC	W 3-0 (25-22, 25-15, 25-21)	304	10–15 (3-9)
4/19; TBD	@ #8 Stanford^{(3)}	#12^{(6)}	Maples Pavilion; Stanford, CA (MPSF Quarterfinal)	FloVolleyball	L 1-3 (25-21, 21-25, 24-26, 15-25)	706	10-16

*-Indicates conference match. ^{(#)}-Indicates tournament seeding.
Times listed are Pacific Time Zone.

== Announcers for televised games ==
- UC Santa Barbara: Max Kelton & Katie Spieler
- UC Irvine: Rob Espero & Charlie Brande
- UC Santa Barbara: Max Kelton & Cameron Greene
- CSUN:
- Penn State:
- Grand Canyon:
- Grand Canyon:
- Stanford:
- Stanford:
- Menlo:
- Pepperdine:
- Pepperdine:
- Long Beach State:
- Long Beach State:
- BYU:
- BYU:
- UCLA:
- UCLA:
- Concordia Irvine:
- Concordia Irvine:
- MPSF Quarterfinal:

== Rankings ==
Ranking movements Legend: ██ Increase in ranking ██ Decrease in ranking RV = Received votes
	Week																	
Poll	Pre	1	2	3	4	5	6	7	8	9	10	11	12	13	14	15	16	Final
AVCA Coaches	10	11	10	10	10	12	12	13	11	10	11	11	11	12	13	12	12	12
Off the Block Media	Not released		RV	RV	RV		RV		RV	RV								

^The Media did not release a Pre-season or Week 1 poll.
