= 2023 Princeton Tigers men's volleyball team =

American college volleyball season

2023 Princeton Tigers men's volleyball
- Conference: Eastern Intercollegiate Volleyball Association
- Record: 13–11 (7–3 EIVA)
- Head coach: Sam Shweisky (14th season)
- Assistant coaches: Lindsay Brown (1st season); Ben Hancock (2nd season)
- Home arena: Dillon Gymnasium

2023 Eastern Intercollegiate Volleyball Association standings
	Conf.				Overall
Team	W		L	PCT	W		L	PCT
No. 3 Penn State ‍†‍‡‍^{y}	10	–	0	1.000	27	–	4	.871
No. 14 Princeton ‍‍‍	7	–	3	.700	14	–	12	.538
Charleston (WV) ‍‍‍	5	–	5	.500	22	–	7	.759
George Mason ‍‍‍	4	–	6	.400	13	–	14	.481
Harvard ‍‍‍	2	–	8	.200	9	–	16	.360
NJIT ‍‍‍	2	–	8	.200	9	–	18	.333
† – Conference champion ‡ – EIVA tournament champion y – Invited to the NCAA tournament Rankings from AVCA

The 2023 Princeton Tigers men's volleyball team represented Princeton University in the 2023 NCAA Division I & II men's volleyball season. The Tigers, led by fourteenth year head coach Sam Shweisky, played their home games at Dillon Gymnasium. The Tigers were members of the Eastern Intercollegiate Volleyball Association and were picked to finish third in the EIVA preseason poll.

The Tigers entered 2023 as the defending EIVA tournament champions, though they suffered an NCAA 1st Round tournament loss to North Greenville.

== Roster ==
2023 Princeton Tigers roster
Defensive specialist/Libero: 11 Simon Xiao - Freshman; 19 Austin Kerker - Freshman; 20 Matt Suh - Sophomore; Middle blockers: 3 Gavin Leising - Junior; 4 Ryan Vena - Freshman; 7 Aiden Benson - Sophomore; 16 Rodrigo Fernandez - Senior; 23 Josh Coan - Junior; Middle hitters/PIN: 17 Andrew Werner - Freshman; 19 Austin Kerker - Freshman; 22 Owen Mellon - Freshman	Outside hitters: 2 Brady Wedbush - Senior; 5 Alexander Mrkalj - Senior; 8 Nate Thompson - Senior; 9 Ben Harrington - Junior; 10 James Hartley - Junior	Opposite hitters: 2 Brady Wedbush - Senior; 10 James Hartley - Junior; 25 Nyherowo Omene - Sophomore; Setters: 6 Danny Sun - Senior; 12 Henry Wedbush - Sophomore; 14 Kyle Gschwend - Freshman; 18 Charlie Rogers - Junior; 21 Stefan Gjaja - Freshman

== Schedule ==
Date Time	Opponent	Rank	Arena City (Tournament)	Television	Score	Attendance	Record (EIVA Record)
1/09; 7 p.m.	@ D'Youville		College Center Gymnasium; Buffalo, NY	ECC SN	W 3–0 (27–25, 25–17, 25–17)	80	1–0
1/10; 7 p.m.	@ Daemen		Charles L. & Gloria B. Lumsden Gymnasium; Amherst, NY	NEC Front Row	L 1-3 (25–27, 25–19, 25–16, 25–22)	375	1–1
1/13; 9 p.m.	@ #2 UCLA		John Wooden Center; Los Angeles, CA	P12+ UCLA	L 1-3 (25–22, 18–25, 20–25, 14–25)	721	1-2
1/16; 10 p.m.	@ #5 Pepperdine		Firestone Fieldhouse; Malibu, CA	WavesCast	L 0-3 (17–25, 23–25, 19–25)	682	1-3
1/18; 8 p.m.	@ Concordia Irvine		CU Arena; Irvine, CA	EagleEye	W 3-1 (25–23, 28–26, 19–25, 25–17)	117	2-3
1/26; 7 p.m.	@ #13 Ohio State		Covelli Center; Columbus, OH	B1G+	L 1-3 (25–27, 18–25, 30–28, 23–25)	568	2-4
1/27; 7 p.m.	@ #13 Ohio State		Covelli Center; Columbus, OH	B1G+	L 2-3 (13–25, 25–23, 25–17, 17–25, 9–15)	722	2-5
2/03; 7 p.m.	Sacred Heart		Dillon Gymnasium; Princeton, NJ	ESPN+	W 3–1 (25–16, 23–25, 25–14, 25–22)	0	3-3
2/04; 4 p.m.	Tusculum		Dillon Gymnasium; Princeton, NJ	ESPN+	Canceled		
2/08; 7 p.m.	#15 CSUN		Dillon Gymnasium; Princeton, NJ	ESPN+	L 2-3 (25–27, 25–17, 25–15, 30–32, 11–15)	0	3-6
2/11; 5 p.m.	St. Francis Brooklyn		Dillon Gymnasium; Princeton, NJ	ESPN+	W 3-0 (25–19, 25–16, 25–22)	0	4-6
2/17; 7 p.m.	@ #3 Penn State*		Rec Hall; University Park, PA	B1G+	L 0-3 (18–25, 23–25, 20–25)	783	4-7 (0–1)
2/18; 4 p.m.	@ #3 Penn State*		Rec Hall; University Park, PA	B1G+	L 0-3 (16–25, 21–25, 17–25)	1,207	4-8 (0–2)
2/24; 7 p.m.	Harvard*		Dillon Gymnasium; Princeton, NJ	ESPN+	W 3-1 (25–16, 25–27, 26–24, 25–18)	0	5-8 (1–2)
2/25; 5 p.m.	Harvard*		Dillon Gymnasium; Princeton, NJ	ESPN+	W 3-1 (24–26, 25–13, 26–24, 25–19)	0	6-8 (2-2)
3/03; 7 p.m.	Fairleigh Dickinson		Dillon Gymnasium; Princeton, NJ	ESPN+	W 3-0 (25–18, 25–18, 25–17)	0	7-8
3/11; 6 p.m.	@ NJIT*		Wellness and Events Center; Newark, NJ	ESPN+	W 3-2 (14–25, 22–25, 25–20, 25–16, 15–11)	311	8-8 (3–2)
3/15; 9 p.m.	@ #5 Grand Canyon		GCU Arena; Phoenix, AZ	ESPN+	L 0-3 (22–25, 20–25, 22–25)	514	8-9
3/17; 7 p.m.	@ #5 Grand Canyon		GCU Arena; Phoenix, AZ	ESPN+	L 0-3 (25–27, 22–25, 21–25)	424	8-10
3/24; 7 p.m.	@ George Mason*		Recreation Athletic Complex; Fairfax, VA (EIVA/A10 Challenge)	ESPN+	W 3-1 (25–20, 21–25, 25–20, 25–17)	289	9-10 (4–2)
3/25; 5 p.m.	vs. #9 Loyola Chicago		Recreation Athletic Complex; Fairfax, VA (EIVA/A10 Challenge)		W 3-1 (28–30, 25–16, 25–23, 31–29)	0	10-10
4/01; 5 p.m.	George Mason*		Dillon Gymnasium; Princeton, NJ	ESPN+	L 0-3 (22–25, 22–25, 18–25)	0	10-11 (4–3)
4/07; 7 p.m.	@ Charleston (WV)*		Russell and Martha Wehrle Innovation Center; Charleston, WV	Mountain East Network	W 3-0 (25–22, 25–19, 25–20)	210	11-11 (5–3)
4/08; 3 p.m.	@ Charleston (WV)*		Russell and Martha Wehrle Innovation Center; Charleston, WV	Mountain East Network	W 3-1 (25–22, 22–25, 27–25, 26–24)	99	12-11 (6–3)
4/14; 7 p.m.	NJIT*		Dillon Gymnasium; Princeton, NJ	ESPN+	W 3-1 (30–28, 22–25, 25–22, 25–21)		13-11 (7–3)

*-Indicates conference match.
Times listed are Eastern Time Zone.

== Broadcasters ==
- D'Youville: Trevor Butts
- Daemen: Ryan Maxwell & Stephanie Albano
- UCLA: Denny Cline
- Pepperdine: Al Epstein
- Concordia Irvine: Jeff Runyan
- Ohio State:
- Ohio State:
- Sacred Heart:
- Tusculum:
- Cal State Northridge:
- St. Francis Brooklyn:
- Penn State:
- Penn State:
- Harvard:
- Harvard:
- Fairleigh Dickinson:
- NJIT:
- Grand Canyon:
- Grand Canyon:
- George Mason:
- George Mason:
- Charleston (WV):
- Charleston (WV):
- NJIT:

== Rankings ==
Ranking movements Legend: ██ Increase in ranking ██ Decrease in ranking RV = Received votes
	Week																	
Poll	Pre	1	2	3	4	5	6	7	8	9	10	11	12	13	14	15	16	Final
AVCA Coaches	15	RV	RV	RV											RV	15	14	14
Off the Block Media	Not released																	RV

^The Media did not release a Pre-season or Week 1 poll.
