= 2023 BYU Cougars men's volleyball team =

American college volleyball season

2023 BYU Cougars men's volleyball
- Conference: Mountain Pacific Sports Federation
- Record: 19–7 (8–4 MPSF)
- Head coach: Shawn Olmstead (8th season)
- Assistant coaches: Devin Young (5th season); Otavio Souza (1st season)
- Home arena: Smith Fieldhouse

The 2023 BYU Cougars men's volleyball team represented Brigham Young University in the 2023 NCAA Division I & II men's volleyball season. The Cougars, led by eighth year head coach Shawn Olmstead, played their home games at Smith Fieldhouse. The Cougars were members of the MPSF. After finishing last season with a MPSF quarterfinal tournament loss, the Cougars were picked to finish sixth in the MPSF Pre-Season Poll.

2023 Mountain Pacific Sports Federation men's volleyball standings
	Conf.				Overall
Team	W		L	PCT	W		L	PCT
No. 1 UCLA ‍†‍‡‍^{y}	12	–	0	1.000	31	–	2	.939
No. 8 BYU ‍‍‍	8	–	4	.667	19	–	7	.731
No. 6 Grand Canyon ‍‍‍^{y}	6	–	6	.500	22	–	8	.733
No. 9 Stanford ‍‍‍	6	–	6	.500	15	–	13	.536
No. 10 Pepperdine ‍‍‍	5	–	7	.417	16	–	14	.533
No. 12 USC ‍‍‍	3	–	9	.250	10	–	16	.385
Concordia Irvine ‍‍‍	2	–	10	.167	8	–	19	.296
† – Conference champion ‡ – MPSF tournament champion y – Invited to the NCAA tournament Rankings from AVCA

== Season highlights ==
- Kupono Browne won the National Opposite of the Week award for Week 0 games.

== Roster ==
2023 BYU Cougars roster
Defensive specialist/libero: 4 Jon Stanley - Senior; 6 Jackson Fife - Freshman; 12 Mitchel Worthington - Senior; 18 Bernardo Adam - Freshman; Middle blockers: 5 Alessandro Gianotti - Freshman; 10 Gavin Julien - (redshirt) Junior; 19 Ethan Gant - Freshman; 21 Teon Taylor - Sophomore; 33 Caleb Sorenson - Freshman	Outside hitters: 1 Luke Benson - Sophomore; 3 Kupono Browne - Junior; 9 Trent Moser - Freshman; 11 Jared Brady - Freshman; 18 Bernardo Adam - Freshman; 23 Miks Ramanis - Sophomore; 24 Brigham Spilsbury - Freshman	Opposite hitters: 13 Anthony Cherfan - Sophomore; Setters: 7 Heath Hughes - Senior; 8 Bartosz Slawinski - Junior; 16 Noa Haine - Junior; 20 Cooper Jarman - Freshman

== Schedule ==
TV/Internet Streaming information:

All home games will be televised on BYUtv or BYUtv.org. Most road games will also be streamed by the schools streaming service. The conference tournament will be streamed by FloVolleyball.

Date time	Opponent	Rank^{(tournament seed)}	Arena city (tournament)	Television	Score	Attendance	Record (MPSF record)
1/6; 7 p.m.	McKendree		Smith Fieldhouse; Provo, UT	BYUtv	W 3–0 (25–20, 25–21, 25–20)	N/A	1–0
1/7; 7 p.m.	#14 Lewis		Smith Fieldhouse; Provo, UT	BYUtv	W 3–1 (25–20, 23–25, 25–17)	3,259	2–0
1/20; 7 p.m.	Fairleigh Dickinson	#13	Smith Fieldhouse; Provo, UT	byutv.org	W 3–0 (25–20, 25–17, 25–15)	3,513	3–0
1/21; 7 p.m.	Fairleigh Dickinson	#13	Smith Fieldhouse; Provo, UT	BYUtv	W 3–0 (25–15, 25–19, 25–15)	4,125	4–0
1/25; 8 p.m.	@ #6 UC Irvine	#12	Bren Events Center; Irvine, CA	ESPN+	L 0-3 (21–25, 23–25, 16–25)	1,102	4–1
1/27; 8 p.m.	@ #6 UC Irvine	#12	Bren Events Center; Irvine, CA	ESPN+	W 3–2 (26–24, 21–25, 25–22, 19–25, 15–9)	1,743	5–1
2/02; 5 p.m.	@ #8 Ball State	#11	Worthen Arena; Muncie, IN	ESPN3	W 3–1 (24–26, 25–23, 25–21, 27–25)	1,567	6–1
2/04; 1 p.m.	@ #8 Ball State	#11	Worthen Arena; Muncie, IN	ESPN3	L 1–3 (26–24, 23–25, 19–25, 23–25)	1,711	6–2
2/10; 7 p.m.	#14 UC Santa Barbara	#10	Smith Fieldhouse; Provo, UT	byutv.org	W 3–1 (22–25, 25–19, 25–23, 25–20)	3,516	7–2
2/11; 7 p.m.	#14 UC Santa Barbara	#10	Smith Fieldhouse; Provo, UT	BYUtv	W 3–1 (25–19, 25–20, 19–25, 25–17)	3,785	8–2
2/17; 8 p.m.	@ #2 UCLA*	#8	Pauley Pavilion; Los Angeles, CA	P12 LA	L 0–3 (20–25, 22–25, 18–25)	1,432	8–3 (0–1)
2/18; 8 p.m.	@ #2 UCLA*	#8	John Wooden Center; Los Angeles, CA	P12+ UCLA	L 0–3 (17–25, 21–25, 18–25)	1,012	8–4 (0–2)
2/24; 8 p.m.	@ Concordia Irvine*	#8	CU Arena; Irvine, CA	Eagle Eye	W 3–0 (25–18, 25–19, 25–19)	105	9–4 (1–2)
2/25; 8 p.m.	@ Concordia Irvine*	#8	CU Arena; Irvine, CA	Eagle Eye	W 3–2 (24–26, 26–24, 19–25, 31–29, 15–12)	421	10–4 (2–2)
3/03; 6 p.m.	@ #5 Grand Canyon*	#8	GCU Arena; Phoenix, AZ	ESPN+	L 0–3 (18–25, 22–25, 21–25)	2,134	10–5 (2–3)
3/04; 6 p.m.	@ #5 Grand Canyon*	#8	GCU Arena; Phoenix, AZ	ESPN+	L 2–3 (25–22, 17–25, 25–19, 17–25, 15–17)	2,567	10–6 (2–4)
3/10; 7 p.m.	#15 Ohio State	#8	Smith Fieldhouse; Provo, UT	byutv.org	W 3–1 (25–23, 25–23, 23–25, 25–21)	3,598	11–6
3/11; 7 p.m.	#15 Ohio State	#8	Smith Fieldhouse; Provo, UT	BYUtv	W 3–2 (25–23, 25–15, 14–25, 23–25, 15–7)	5,071	12–6
3/24; 7 p.m.	#7 Pepperdine*	#8	Smith Fieldhouse; Provo, UT	BYUtv	W 3–2 (21–25, 25–22, 19–25, 25–20, 15–11)	4,156	13–6 (3–4)
3/25; 7 p.m.	#7 Pepperdine*	#8	Smith Fieldhouse; Provo, UT	byutv.org	W 3–2 (22–25, 25–16, 25–21, 23–25, 15–13)	4,325	14–6 (4–4)
3/30; 7 p.m.	#11 USC*	#7	Smith Fieldhouse; Provo, UT	byutv.org	W 3–1 (25–21, 22–25, 25–17, 25–20)	3,283	15–6 (5–4)
3/31; 7 p.m.	#11 USC*	#7	Smith Fieldhouse; Provo, UT	BYUtv	W 3–1 (25–20, 30–28, 24–26, 25–14)	4,261	16–6 (6–4)
4/14; 7 p.m.	#8 Stanford*	#6	Smith Fieldhouse; Provo, UT	byutv.org	W 3–1 (25–20, 19–25, 25–21, 26–24)	4,358	17–6 (7–4)
4/15; 7 p.m.	#8 Stanford*	#6	Smith Fieldhouse; Provo, UT	BYUtv	W 3–0 (25–22, 25–23, 25–19)	4,178	18–6 (8–4)
4/19; 4:05 p.m.	Concordia Irvine ^{(7)}	#6^{(2)}	Maples Pavilion; Stanford, CA (MPSF Quarterfinal)	FloVolleyball	W 3–1 (20–25, 25–23, 25–18, 25–15)	505	19–6
4/20; 8:05 p.m.	@ #8 Stanford^{(3)}	#6^{(2)}	Maples Pavilion; Stanford, CA (MPSF Semifinal)	FloVolleyball	L 2–3 (20–25, 25–23, 22–25, 25–22, 12–15)	617	19–7

*-Indicates conference match.
Times listed are Mountain Time Zone.

== Announcers for televised games ==
- McKendree: Jarom Jordan, Steve Vail, & Kenzie Koerber
- Lewis: Jarom Jordan, Steve Vail, & Kenzie Koerber
- Fairleigh Dickinson: Jarom Jordan, Steve Vail, & Lauren McClain
- Fairleigh Dickinson: Jarom Jordan, Steve Vail, & Lauren McClain
- UC Irvine: Rob Espero & Charlie Brande
- UC Irvine: Rob Espero & Charlie Brande
- Ball State: Lexi Eblen & Hudson French
- Ball State: Mick Tidrow, Amber Seaman, & Madison Surface
- UC Santa Barbara: Jarom Jordan, Kenzie Koerber, & Lauren McClain
- UC Santa Barbara: Jarom Jordan, Kenzie Koerber, & Lauren McClain; Guest Analyst: Kevin Barnett
- UCLA: Brian Webber
- UCLA: Denny Cline
- Concordia Irvine: Alex Parisian
- Concordia Irvine: Jeff Runyan & Alex Parisian
- Grand Canyon: Houston Boe & Amanda Roach
- Grand Canyon: Houston Boe & Amanda Roach
- Ohio State: Spencer Linton, Steve Vail, & Kenzie Koerber-Dahle
- Ohio State: Spencer Linton, Steve Vail, & Kenzie Koerber-Dahle
- Pepperdine: Jarom Jordan, Steve Vail, & Lauren McClain
- Pepperdine: Jarom Jordan, Steve Vail, & Lauren McClain
- USC: Jarom Jordan, Steve Vail, & Kenzie Koerber-Dahle
- USC: Jason Shepherd, Steve Vail, & Kenzie Koerber-Dahle
- Stanford: Jarom Jordan, Steve Vail, & Kenzie Koerber-Dahle
- Stanford: Jarom Jordan, Steve Vail, & Kenzie Koerber-Dahle
- MPSF Quarterfinal- :

== Rankings ==
Ranking movements Legend: ██ Increase in ranking ██ Decrease in ranking RV = Received votes
	Week																	
Poll	Pre	1	2	3	4	5	6	7	8	9	10	11	12	13	14	15	16	Final
AVCA Coaches	RV	13	13	12	11	10	8	8	8	8	8	8	7	7	6	6	7	8
Off the Block Media	Not released		RV	RV	RV	9	7	9	9	9	9	8	7	7	5	5		8

^The Media does not release a Pre-season or Week 1 poll.
