= 2023 Harvard Crimson men's volleyball team =

American college volleyball season

2023 Harvard Crimson men's volleyball
- Conference: Eastern Intercollegiate Volleyball Association
- Record: 9–15 (2–8 EIVA)
- Head coach: Brian Baise (13th season)
- Assistant coach: Nick Clark (2nd season)
- Home arena: Malkin Athletic Center

The 2023 Harvard Crimson men's volleyball team represented Harvard University in the 2023 NCAA Division I & II men's volleyball season. The Crimson, led by 13th year head coach Brian Baise, played their home games at Malkin Athletic Center. The Crimson were members of the EIVA. They were picked to finish fifth in the EIVA preseason poll.

2023 Eastern Intercollegiate Volleyball Association standings
	Conf.				Overall
Team	W		L	PCT	W		L	PCT
No. 3 Penn State ‍†‍‡‍^{y}	10	–	0	1.000	27	–	4	.871
No. 14 Princeton ‍‍‍	7	–	3	.700	14	–	12	.538
Charleston (WV) ‍‍‍	5	–	5	.500	22	–	7	.759
George Mason ‍‍‍	4	–	6	.400	13	–	14	.481
Harvard ‍‍‍	2	–	8	.200	9	–	16	.360
NJIT ‍‍‍	2	–	8	.200	9	–	18	.333
† – Conference champion ‡ – EIVA tournament champion y – Invited to the NCAA tournament Rankings from AVCA

== Season highlights ==
- Will be filled in as the season progresses.

== Roster ==
Number	Name	Class	Position	Height	Hometown
1	Andrew Lobo	Sophomore	Outside Hitter	6-2	Toronto, Ontario
2	Ethan Smith	Junior	Middle Blocker	6-7	Laguna Niguel, California
3	Ryan Hong	Senior	Middle Blocker/Outside Hitter	6-2	Honolulu, Hawaii
4	Callum Diak	Freshman	Libero	6-1	Kingston, Ontario
5	Azim Raheem	Sophomore	Opposite Hitter	6-6	Toronto, Ontario
6	Alessio Pignatelli	Senior	Libero/Defensive Specialist	5-11	Acqui Terme, Italy
8	Brian Thomas	Freshman	Middle Blocker	7-0	Moraga, California
9	Ethan McCrary	Junior	Middle Blocker	6-9	Mission Viejo, California
10	Logan Shepherd	Sophomore	Outside Hitter	6-4	Cave Springs, Arkansas
11	Will Polster	Senior	Outside Hitter	6-1	Maryland Heights, Missouri
12	Zach Berty	Freshman	Outside Hitter	6-6	Corona del Mar, California
13	Kade McGovern	Sophomore	Opposite Hitter	6-6	Burbank, California
16	Xuanthe Nguyen	Sophomore	Libero	5-11	London, England
18	Will Sorenson	Senior	Setter	6-1	Killdeer, Illinois
19	Owen Fanning	Sophomore	Outside Hitter	6-7	Needham, Massachusetts
21	James Bardin	Sophomore	Setter	6-7	Aliso Viejo, California
22	Trevor Schultz	Junior	Middle Blocker	6-6	Saint Augustine, Florida

== Schedule ==
TV/Internet Streaming information:

All home games will be streamed on ESPN+. Most road games will also be streamed by the schools streaming service.

Date Time	Opponent	Rank	Arena City (Tournament)	Television	Score	Attendance	Record (EIVA Record)
1/13; 7 p.m.	@ Sacred Heart		William H. Pitt Center; Fairfield, CT	NEC Front Row	W 3–1 (15-25, 25–23, 25–20, 25–19)	223	1-0
1/17; 7 p.m.	@ Merrimack		Hammel Court; North Andover, MA	NEC Front Row	W 3–0 (25–22, 25–14, 25–20)	232	2–0
1/20; 7 p.m.	@ #6 Ball State		Worthen Arena; Muncie, IN	ESPN+	L 0-3 (16-25, 18–25, 14–25)	2,151	2-1
1/21; 5 p.m.	@ Purdue Fort Wayne		Hilliard Gates Sports Center; Ft. Wayne, IN	YouTube	L 0-3 (23-25, 23–25, 19–25)	497	2-2
1/27; 7 p.m.	North Greenville		Malkin Athletic Center; Cambridge, MA (Harvard Invitational)	ESPN+	W 3-0 (25-22, 26–24, 25–23)	0	3-2
1/28; 7 p.m.	McKendree		Malkin Athletic Center; Cambridge, MA (Harvard Invitational)	ESPN+	L 2-3 (25-20, 19–25, 22–25, 25-22, 10-15)	115	3-3
2/03; 7 p.m.	Daemen		Malkin Athletic Center; Cambridge, MA	ESPN+	L 1-3 (15-25, 25–19, 17–25, 35-37)	151	3-4
2/08; 7 p.m.	Merrimack		Malkin Athletic Center; Cambridge, MA	ESPN+	W 3-0 (25-20, 25–20, 25–21)	105	4-4
2/17; 7 p.m.	@ #15 Charleston (WV)*		Russell and Martha Wehrle Innovation Center; Charleston, WV	Mountain East Network	L 0-3 (17-25, 23-25, 19-25)	200	4-5 (0-1)
2/18; 2 p.m.	@ #15 Charleston (WV)*		Russell and Martha Wehrle Innovation Center; Charleston, WV	Mountain East Network	L 0-3 (19-25, 11-25, 10-25)	100	4-6 (0-2)
2/24; 7 p.m.	@ Princeton*		Dillon Gymnasium; Princeton, NJ	ESPN+	L 1-3 (16-25, 27-25, 24-26, 18-25)	0	4-7 (0-3)
2/25; 5:30 p.m.	@ Princeton*		Dillon Gymnasium; Princeton, NJ	ESPN+	L 1-3 (26-24, 13-25, 24-26, 19-25)	0	4-8 (0-4)
3/03; 7 p.m.	St. Francis Brooklyn		Malkin Athletic Center; Cambridge, MA	ESPN+	W 3-2 (25-19, 25-16, 22-25, 23-25, 15-3)	342	5-8
3/04; 5 p.m.	LIU		Malkin Athletic Center; Cambridge, MA	ESPN+	W 3-1 (25-19, 25-23, 16-25, 25-22)	302	6-8
3/14; 10 p.m.	@ UC Santa Barbara		Robertson Gymnasium; Santa Barbara, CA	ESPN+	L 0-3 (21-25, 18-25, 18-25)	130	6-9
3/15; 8 p.m.	@ #7 Pepperdine		Firestone Fieldhouse; Malibu, CA	ESPN+	L 0-3 (16-25, 22-25, 15-25)	583	6-10
3/22; 7 p.m.	Sacred Heart		Malkin Athletic Center; Cambridge, MA	ESPN+	L 2-3 (12-25, 25-18, 25-18, 22-25, 8-15)	155	6-11
3/24; 7 p.m.	American International		Malkin Athletic Center; Cambridge, MA	ESPN+	W 3-0 (25-15, 25-11, 25-16)	326	7-11
3/31; 7 p.m.	#3 Penn State*		Malkin Athletic Center; Cambridge, MA	ESPN+	L 0-3 (16-25, 15-25, 23-25)	481	7-12 (0-5)
4/01; 3 p.m.	#3 Penn State*		Malkin Athletic Center; Cambridge, MA	ESPN+	L 0-3 (17-25, 27-29, 21-25)	442	7-13 (0-6)
4/07; 6 p.m.	@ NJIT*		Wellness and Events Center; Newark, NJ	America East TV	W 3-2 (25-19, 25-22, 22-25, 23-25, 18-16)	215	8-13 (1-6)
4/08; 4 p.m.	@ NJIT*		Wellness and Events Center; Newark, NJ	America East TV	W 3-2 (25-20, 22-25, 25-19, 11-25, 15-13)	222	9-13 (2-6)
4/14; 7 p.m.	George Mason*		Malkin Athletic Center; Cambridge, MA	ESPN+	L 0-3 (22-25, 21-25, 20-25)	162	9-14 (2-7)
4/15; 4 p.m.	George Mason*		Malkin Athletic Center; Cambridge, MA	ESPN+	L 1-3 (15-25, 25-23, 19-25, 23-25)	147	9-15 (2-8)

*-Indicates conference match.
Times listed are Eastern Time Zone.

== Announcers for televised games ==
- Sacred Heart: Bernie Picozzi
- Merrimack: No commentary
- Ball State: Joey Lindstrom & Amber Seaman
- Purdue Fort Wayne:
- North Greenville:
- McKendree:
- Daemen:
- Merrimack:
- Charleston (WV):
- Charleston (WV):
- Princeton:
- Princeton:
- St. Francis Brooklyn:
- LIU:
- UC Santa Barbara:
- Pepperdine:
- Sacred Heart:
- American International:
- Penn State:
- Penn State:
- NJIT:
- NJIT:
- George Mason:
- George Mason:
