= 2023 Mountain Pacific Sports Federation men's volleyball tournament =

Volleyball Tournament

2023 Mountain Pacific Sports Federation Men's Volleyball Tournament
- Classification: Division I/II
- Teams: 7
- Site: Maples Pavilion; Stanford, CA
- Champions: UCLA
- Winning coach: John Speraw
- Television: FloVolleyball
- Mountain Pacific Sports Federation Men's Volleyball Tournaments

2023 Mountain Pacific Sports Federation volleyball standings
| | Conf. | | | | Overall |
| Team | W | | L | PCT | W | | L | PCT |
|---|---|---|---|---|---|---|---|---|
| No. 1 UCLA ‍†‍‡‍^{y} | 12 | – | 0 | 1.000 | 31 | – | 2 | .939 |
| No. 8 BYU ‍‍‍ | 8 | – | 4 | .667 | 19 | – | 7 | .731 |
| No. 6 Grand Canyon ‍‍‍^{y} | 6 | – | 6 | .500 | 22 | – | 8 | .733 |
| No. 9 Stanford ‍‍‍ | 6 | – | 6 | .500 | 15 | – | 13 | .536 |
| No. 10 Pepperdine ‍‍‍ | 5 | – | 7 | .417 | 16 | – | 14 | .533 |
| No. 12 USC ‍‍‍ | 3 | – | 9 | .250 | 10 | – | 16 | .385 |
| Concordia Irvine ‍‍‍ | 2 | – | 10 | .167 | 8 | – | 19 | .296 |
† – Conference champion ‡ – 2023 MPSF Tournament champion y- Invited to the NCAA Volleyball Tournament; Rankings from AVCA

The 2023 Mountain Pacific Sports Federation men's volleyball tournament was a postseason men's volleyball tournament for the Mountain Pacific Sports Federation during the 2023 NCAA Division I & II men's volleyball season. It was scheduled for April 19 through April 22, 2023 at the Maples Pavilion on the campus of Stanford University. The Venue was chosen before the season started. All games will be streamed live on FloVolleyball.

The winner received The Federation's automatic bid to the 2023 NCAA Volleyball Tournament, to be held at EagleBank Arena.

== Seeds ==
All seven teams were eligible for the postseason, with the #1 seed receiving a bye to the semifinals. Teams were seeded by record within the conference, with a tiebreaker system to seed teams with identical conference records. The #1 seed played the lowest remaining seed in the semifinals.

| Seed | School | Conference | Tiebreaker |
|---|---|---|---|
| 1 | UCLA | 12-0 | – |
| 2 | BYU | 8–4 | – |
| 3 | Stanford | 6–6 | 2–0 vs. GCU |
| 4 | Grand Canyon | 6–6 | 0–2 vs. Stanford |
| 5 | Pepperdine | 5-7 | – |
| 6 | USC | 3–9 | – |
| 7 | Concordia Irvine | 2–10 | – |

== Schedule and results ==
| Time Network | Matchup | Score | Attendance | Broadcasters |
Quarterfinals – Wednesday, April 19
| 3:05 p.m. FloVolleyball | No. 2 BYU vs. No. 7 Concordia Irvine | 3–1 (20–25, 25–23, 25–18, 25–15) | 505 | Kevin Danna & Tim Swartz |
| 5:35 p.m. FloVolleyball | No. 3 Stanford vs. No. 6 USC | 3–1 (21–25, 25–21, 26–24, 25–15) | 706 | Kevin Danna & Tim Swartz |
| 8 p.m. FloVolleyball | No. 4 Grand Canyon vs. No. 5 Pepperdine | 3–0 (25–22, 25–17, 25–20) | 705 | Kevin Danna & Tim Swartz |
Semifinals – Thursday, April 20
| 4:35 p.m. FloVolleyball | No. 1 UCLA vs. No. 4 Grand Canyon | 3–0 (25–23, 25–19, 25–20) | 457 | Kevin Danna & Tim Swartz |
| 7:05 p.m. FloVolleyball | No. 2 BYU vs. No. 3 Stanford | 2–3 (20–25, 25–23, 22–25, 25-22, 12-15) | 617 | Kevin Danna & Tim Swartz |
Championship – Saturday, April 22
| 6:05 p.m. FloVolleyball | No. 1 UCLA vs. No. 3 Stanford | 3-0 (25-22, 25-21, 25-23) | 1,721 | Kevin Danna & Tim Swartz |
Game times are PT. Rankings denote tournament seeding.

== Bracket ==
Quarterfinals; Wednesday, April 20
1 | UCLA
(bye)
2 | BYU | 3
7 | Concordia Irvine | 1
(Pairings are reseeded after the first round)
3 | Stanford | 3
6 | USC | 1
4 | Grand Canyon | 3
5 | Pepperdine | 0

Semifinals; Thursday, April 21
1 | UCLA | 3
4 | Grand Canyon | 0
2 | BYU | 2
3 | Stanford | 3

Championship; Saturday, April 23
1 | UCLA | 3
3 | Stanford | 0

== Game summaries ==
All times are Pacific.
