= 2023 Penn State Nittany Lions men's volleyball team =

American college volleyball season

2023 Penn State Nittany Lions men's volleyball

Outrigger Volleyball Invitational Champions EIVA Regular Season Champions EIVA Tournament Champions

NCAA Tournament, Semifinals
- Conference: Eastern Intercollegiate Volleyball Association
- Record: 27-4 (10–0 EIVA)
- Head coach: Mark Pavlik (29th season)
- Assistant coaches: Colin McMillan (16th season); Pat Shawaryn (2nd season)
- Home arena: Rec Hall

2023 Eastern Intercollegiate Volleyball Association standings
	Conf.				Overall
Team	W		L	PCT	W		L	PCT
No. 3 Penn State ‍†‍‡‍^{y}	10	–	0	1.000	27	–	4	.871
No. 14 Princeton ‍‍‍	7	–	3	.700	14	–	12	.538
Charleston (WV) ‍‍‍	5	–	5	.500	22	–	7	.759
George Mason ‍‍‍	4	–	6	.400	13	–	14	.481
Harvard ‍‍‍	2	–	8	.200	9	–	16	.360
NJIT ‍‍‍	2	–	8	.200	9	–	18	.333
† – Conference champion ‡ – EIVA tournament champion y – Invited to the NCAA tournament Rankings from AVCA

The 2023 Penn State Nittany Lions men's volleyball team represented Pennsylvania State University in the 2023 NCAA Division I & II men's volleyball season. The Nittany Lions, led by 29th year head coach Mark Pavlik, played their home games at Rec Hall. The Nittany Lions were members of the Eastern Intercollegiate Volleyball Association and were picked to win the EIVA in the preseason poll.

== Roster ==
2023 Penn State Nittany Lions roster
Defensive Specialist/Libero: 7 Ryan Merk - Sophomore; Middle Blockers: 13 Owen Rose - Sophomore; 14 Sam Marsh - Graduate; 18 Toby Ezeonu - Junior	Outside Hitters: 2 Tim Herget - Senior; 3 Jack Shampine - Senior; 4 Michael Valenzi - Junior; 5 Matt Cosgrove - Sophomore; 8 Michal Kowal - Junior; 10 Gabe Hartke - Senior; 12 Brett Wildman - Graduate; 15 Matthew Luoma - Freshman; 16 Blainey Jones - Freshman; 17 Will Kuhns - Junior; 20 Caden Day - Freshman	Opposite Hitters: 9 John Kerr - Senior; 15 Matthew Luoma - Freshman; 19 Cal Fisher - Graduate; 22 Cole Ignaszak - Sophomore; Setters: 1 Luke Snyder - Junior; 6 Cole Bogner - Graduate; 11 Jack Driscoll - Senior; 21 Tyler Herget - Sophomore

== Schedule ==
Date Time	Opponent	Rank	Arena City (Tournament)	Television	Score	Attendance	Record (EIVA Record)
1/06; 7 p.m.	vs. Central State	#4	Covelli Center; Columbus, OH		W 3–1 (25–16, 24–26, 25–19, 25–12)	101	1–0
1/07; 4 p.m.	@ #13 Ohio State	#4	Covelli Center; Columbus, OH (Big Ten Showdown)	B1G+	W 3–1 (25–20, 25–17, 23–25, 25–21)	1,005	2–0
1/13; 7 p.m.	Daemen	#4	Rec Hall South Gym; University Park, PA	B1G+	W 3–0 (25–10, 25–19, 25–22)	357	3-0
1/14; 7 p.m.	Merrimack	#4	Rec Hall; University Park, PA	B1G+	W 3–0 (25–16, 25–14, 25–13)	550	4-0
1/20; 4 p.m.	vs. #5 Pepperdine	#4	Austin Convention Center; Austin, TX (First Point Men's Volleyball Collegiate Challenge)	Volleyball World TV	W 3–1 (26-24, 25–18, 19–25, 25-14)	1,127	5-0
1/21; 7 p.m.	vs. #8 Stanford	#4	Austin Convention Center; Austin, TX (First Point Men's Volleyball Collegiate Challenge)	Volleyball World TV	W 3–1 (25-18, 25–17, 20-25, 25-23)	1,404	6-0
1/25; 7 p.m.	#3 Long Beach State	#4	Rec Hall; University Park, PA	B1G+	L 1-3 (25-18, 23-25, 24-26, 25-27)	778	6-1
2/03; 7 p.m.	#10 USC	#4	Rec Hall; University Park, PA (Big Ten/Pac 12 Challenge)	B1G+	W 3-1 (30-28, 25-20, 23-25, 25-18)	1,177	7-1
2/04; 7 p.m.	#2 UCLA	#4	Rec Hall; University Park, PA (Big Ten/Pac 12 Challenge)	B1G+	W 3-1 (25-21, 18-25, 25-19, 25-17)	0	8-1
2/11; 7 p.m.	@ St. Francis	#3	DeGol Arena; Loretto, PA	NEC Front Row	W 3-2 (22-25, 23-25, 25-22, 25-23, 15-10)	275	9-1
2/17; 7 p.m.	Princeton*	#3	Rec Hall South Gym; University Park, PA	B1G+	W 3-0 (25-18, 25-23, 25-20)	783	10-1 (1-0)
2/18; 4 p.m.	Princeton*	#3	Rec Hall; University Park, PA	B1G+	W 3-0 (25-16, 25-21, 25-17)	1,207	11-1 (2-0)
2/24; 6 p.m.	@ NJIT*	#3	Wellness and Events Center; Newark, NJ	ESPN+	W 3-0 (25-20, 28-26, 25-23)	456	12-1 (3-0)
2/25; 7 p.m.	@ NJIT*	#3	Wellness and Events Center; Newark, NJ	ESPN+	W 3-0 (25-17, 25-17, 25-20)	449	13-1 (4-0)
3/04; 5 p.m.	@ Concordia Irvine	#3	CU Arena; Irvine, CA	EagleEye	W 3-0 (25-19, 40-38, 25-20)	111	14-1
3/05; 8 p.m.	@ #6 UC Irvine	#3	Bren Events Center; Irvine, CA	ESPN+	W 3-2 (32-34, 25-23, 18-25, 25-22, 15-11)	881	15-1
3/09; 10 p.m.	vs. #2 UCLA	#3	Stan Sheriff Center; Honolulu, HI (Outrigger Volleyball Invitational)		L 2-3 (20-25, 22-25, 25-16, 25-21, 10-15)	0	15-2
3/11; 1 a.m.	@ #1 Hawai'i	#3	Stan Sheriff Center; Honolulu, HI (Outrigger Volleyball Invitational)	ESPN+	W 3-1 (21-25, 25-23, 25-21, 25-23)	6,557	16-2
3/11; 10 p.m.	vs. Purdue Fort Wayne	#3	Stan Sheriff Center; Honolulu, HI (Outrigger Volleyball Invitational)		W 3-0 (25-15, 25-11, 25-16)	0	17-2
3/18; 7 p.m.	St. Francis	#2	Rec Hall; University Park, PA	B1G+	W 3-0 (27-25, 25-22, 25-14)	0	18-2
3/21; 7 p.m.	#15 Ohio State	#1	Rec Hall; University Park, PA (Big Ten Showdown)	B1G+	L 2-3 (21-25, 25-18, 25-22, 21-25, 13-15)	1,095	18-3
3/31; 7 p.m.	@ Harvard*	#3	Malkin Athletic Center; Cambridge, MA	ESPN+	W 3-0 (25-16, 25-15, 25-23)	481	19-3 (5-0)
4/01; 3 p.m.	@ Harvard*	#3	Malkin Athletic Center; Cambridge, MA	ESPN+	W 3-0 (25-17, 29-27, 25-21)	442	20-3 (6-0)
4/07; 7 p.m.	@ George Mason*	#3	Recreation Athletic Complex; Fairfax, VA	ESPN+	W 3-0 (25-20, 25-20, 25-15)	482	21-3 (7-0)
4/08; 5 p.m.	@ George Mason*	#3	Recreation Athletic Complex; Fairfax, VA	ESPN+	W 3-0 (25-20, 25-17, 25-20)	449	22-3 (8-0)
4/14; 7 p.m.	#15 Charleston (WV)*	#3	Rec Hall South Gym; University Park, PA	B1G+	W 3-0 (25-23, 25-19, 25-13)	781	23-3 (9-0)
4/15; 4 p.m.	#15 Charleston (WV)*	#3	Rec Hall South Gym; University Park, PA	B1G+	W 3-1 (25-13, 25-20, 22-25, 25-16)	863	24-3 (10-0)
5/2; 7:30 p.m.	#9 Ohio State	#3	EagleBank Arena; Fairfax, VA (NCAA Quarterfinal)	ESPN+	W 3-1 (25-22, 24-26, 25-13, 26-24)	2,139	26-4
5/4; 7:30 p.m.	#1 Hawai'i^{(2)}	#3	EagleBank Arena; Fairfax, VA (NCAA Semifinal)	NCAA.com	L 2-3 (20–25, 23-25, 25-16, 25-23, 10-15)	3,782	27-4

*-Indicates conference match.
Times listed are Eastern Time Zone.

== Broadcasters ==
- Ohio State: Greg Franke & Hanna Williford
- Daemen: No commentary
- Merrimack: Dylan Price & Thomas English
- Pepperdine: Rob Espero & Bill Walton
- Stanford: Rob Espero & Bill Walton
- Long Beach State:
- USC:
- UCLA:
- St. Francis:
- Princeton:
- Princeton:
- NJIT:
- NJIT:
- Concordia Irvine:
- UC Irvine:
- Hawai'i:
- St. Francis:
- Ohio State:
- Harvard:
- Harvard:
- George Mason:
- George Mason:
- Charleston:
- Charleston:

== Rankings ==
Ranking movements Legend: ██ Increase in ranking ██ Decrease in ranking
	Week																	
Poll	Pre	1	2	3	4	5	6	7	8	9	10	11	12	13	14	15	16	Final
AVCA Coaches	4	4	4	4	4	3	3	3	3	3	2	1	3	3	3	3	3	3
Off the Block Media	Not released		4	3	4	3	3	3	3	3	1	1	3	3	3	3		3

^The Media did not release a Pre-season or Week 1 poll.

== Honors ==
- Owen Rose won the National Middle Attacker of the Week award for Week 0 games.
