= 2023 Grand Canyon Antelopes men's volleyball team =

American college volleyball season

2023 Grand Canyon Antelopes men's volleyball

NCAA Tournament, Quarterfinals
- Conference: Mountain Pacific Sports Federation
- Record: 22-8 (6–6 MPSF)
- Head coach: Matt Werle (8th season)
- Assistant coach: Matt August (1st season)
- Home arena: GCU Arena

The 2023 Grand Canyon Antelopes men's volleyball team represented Grand Canyon University in the 2023 NCAA Division I & II men's volleyball season. The 'Lopes, led by eighth year head coach Matt Werle, played their home games at GCU Arena. The 'Lopes were members of the MPSF and were picked to finish fourth in the MPSF preseason poll.

2023 Mountain Pacific Sports Federation men's volleyball standings
	Conf.				Overall
Team	W		L	PCT	W		L	PCT
No. 1 UCLA ‍†‍‡‍^{y}	12	–	0	1.000	31	–	2	.939
No. 8 BYU ‍‍‍	8	–	4	.667	19	–	7	.731
No. 6 Grand Canyon ‍‍‍^{y}	6	–	6	.500	22	–	8	.733
No. 9 Stanford ‍‍‍	6	–	6	.500	15	–	13	.536
No. 10 Pepperdine ‍‍‍	5	–	7	.417	16	–	14	.533
No. 12 USC ‍‍‍	3	–	9	.250	10	–	16	.385
Concordia Irvine ‍‍‍	2	–	10	.167	8	–	19	.296
† – Conference champion ‡ – MPSF tournament champion y – Invited to the NCAA tournament Rankings from AVCA

== Roster ==
2023 Grand Canyon roster
Defensive specialist/libero: 13 Cole Udall - (redshirt) Senior; 15 Cooper Herndon - (redshirt) Sophomore; Middle blockers: 3 Chibuike Obi - (redshirt) Junior; 8 Cameron Thorne - Freshman; 9 Troy Culp - Senior; 14 Jacob Guerber - (redshirt) Junior; 18 Matthew Meeker-Hackett - (redshirt) Freshman; 21 Colin Lovejoy - Senior; 23 Rico Wardlow - Junior; 24 Nicholas Bentlage - (redshirt) Freshman	Outside hitters: 1 Camden Gianni - (redshirt) Junior; 2 Karter Rogers - (redshirt) Sophomore; 5 Chase Gianni - (redshirt) Freshman; 11 Christian Janke - (redshirt) Senior; 12 Grayson Browning - (redshirt) Senior; 16 Jackson Hickman - (redshirt) Junior; 22 Jordan Lucas - Freshman; 25 Jacob Ceci - Freshman	Opposite hitters: 6 Jonah Gilbert - (redshirt) Freshman; 20 Carson Brandt - (redshirt) Junior; Setters: 4 Aidan Case- (redshirt) Freshman; 7 Nicholas Slight - (redshirt) Sophomore; 10 Jaxon Herr - Freshman

== Schedule ==
TV/Internet Streaming information:

All home games were streamed on ESPN+. Most road games were also streamed by the schools streaming service. The conference tournament was streamed by FloVolleyball.

Date time	Opponent	Rank^{(tournament seed)}	Arena city (tournament)	Television	Score	Attendance	Record (MPSF record)
1/6; 6 p.m.	Lindenwood	#11	GCU Arena; Phoenix, AZ	ESPN+	W 3–1 (25–21, 25–15, 35–37, 25–13)	1,057	1–0
1/8; 12 p.m.	Lindenwood	#11	GCU Arena; Phoenix, AZ	ESPN+	W 3–0 (25–21, 25–22, 25–21)	418	2–0
1/13; 5 p.m.	@ George Mason	#9	Recreation Athletic Complex; Fairfax, VA (Patriot Invitational)	ESPN+	W 3–0 (25–20, 25–18, 25–16)	293	3–0
1/14; 3 p.m.	vs. #14 Ohio State	#9	Recreation Athletic Complex; Fairfax, VA (Patriot Invitational)		W 3–2 (23-25, 25–18, 25–23, 18–25, 15–10)		4-0
1/27; 6 p.m.	Erskine	#9	GCU Arena; Phoenix, AZ	ESPN+	W 3–0 (26-24, 25–20, 25–17)	563	5-0
1/29; 2 p.m.	UC San Diego	#9	GCU Arena; Phoenix, AZ	ESPN+	W 3–0 (25-19, 25–19, 25–23)	459	6-0
1/31; 6 p.m.	Lees-McRae	#9	GCU Arena; Phoenix, AZ	ESPN+	W 3–0 (25-18, 25–17, 25–19)	386	7-0
2/01; 6 p.m.	Lees-McRae	#9	GCU Arena; Phoenix, AZ	ESPN+	W 3–1 (23-25, 25–14, 25–17, 25–20)	346	8-0
2/03; 6 p.m.	#7 UC Irvine	#9	GCU Arena; Phoenix, AZ	ESPN+	W 3–1 (25-19, 25–19, 12–25, 25–22)	1,108	9-0
2/04; 6 p.m.	#7 UC Irvine	#9	GCU Arena; Phoenix, AZ	ESPN+	W 3–2 (25-21, 21–25, 19–25, 27–25, 15–13)	704	10-0
2/10; 6 p.m.	Arizona Christian	#5	GCU Arena; Phoenix, AZ	ESPN+	W 3–0 (25-12, 25–20, 25–21)	548	11-0
2/15; 8 p.m.	@ #12 USC*	#5	Galen Center; Los Angeles, CA	P12, P12 LA	W 3–1 (25-21, 25–22, 26–28, 25–22)	400	12-0 (1-0)
2/17; 8 p.m.	@ #12 USC*	#5	Galen Center; Los Angeles, CA	P12+ USC	W 3–1 (21-25, 25–22, 25–20, 25–22)	401	13-0 (2-0)
2/22; 8 p.m.	@ #7 Pepperdine*	#5	Firestone Fieldhouse; Malibu, CA	WavesCast	W 3–2 (25-18, 25–21, 23–25, 20–25, 16–14)	437	14-0 (3-0)
2/24; 1 p.m.	@ #7 Pepperdine*	#5	Firestone Fieldhouse; Malibu, CA	WavesCast	L 2-3 (25-20, 25–23, 17–25, 25–27, 9–15)	317	14-1 (3-1)
3/03; 6 p.m.	#8 BYU*	#5	GCU Arena; Phoenix, AZ	ESPN+	W 3-0 (25-18, 25–22, 25–21)	2,134	15-1 (4-1)
3/04; 6 p.m.	#8 BYU*	#5	GCU Arena; Phoenix, AZ	ESPN+	W 3-2 (22-25, 25–17, 19–25, 25–17, 17–15)	2,567	16-1 (5-1)
3/08; 6 p.m.	#11 Ball State	#5	GCU Arena; Phoenix, AZ	ESPN+	W 3-0 (26-24, 25–23, 25–19)	545	17-1
3/10; 6 p.m.	Olivet Nazarene	#5	GCU Arena; Phoenix, AZ	ESPN+	W 3-0 (25-19, 25–14, 25–20)	457	18-1
3/15; 6 p.m.	Princeton	#5	GCU Arena; Phoenix, AZ	ESPN+	W 3-0 (25-22, 25–20, 25–22)	514	19-1
3/17; 4 p.m.	Princeton	#5	GCU Arena; Phoenix, AZ	ESPN+	W 3-0 (27-25, 25–22, 25–21)	424	20-1
3/24; 7 p.m.	Concordia Irvine*	#5	GCU Arena; Phoenix, AZ	ESPN+	L 2-3 (23-25, 23–25, 27–25, 25–12, 9–15)	756	20-2 (5-2)
3/25; 6 p.m.	Concordia Irvine*	#5	GCU Arena; Phoenix, AZ	ESPN+	W 3-0 (37-35, 25–22, 25–16)	812	21-2 (6-2)
3/31; 6 p.m.	#2 UCLA*	#5	GCU Arena; Phoenix, AZ	ESPN+	L 1-3 (31-29, 25–27, 20–25, 13–25)	1,821	21-3 (6-3)
4/01; 6 p.m.	#2 UCLA*	#5	GCU Arena; Phoenix, AZ	ESPN+	L 0-3 (28-30, 21–25, 19–25)	1,563	21-4 (6-4)
4/07; 7 p.m.	@ #9 Stanford*	#6	Maples Pavilion; Stanford, CA	P12+ STAN	L 0-3 (17-25, 17–25, 20–25)	612	21-5 (6-5)
4/08; 6 p.m.	@ #9 Stanford*	#6	Maples Pavilion; Stanford, CA	P12+ STAN	L 2-3 (21-25, 26–24, 18–25, 25–22, 10–15)	724	21-6 (6-6)
4/19; 8 p.m.	#9 Pepperdine^{(5)}	#7^{(4)}	Maples Pavilion; Stanford, CA (MPSF Quarterfinal)	FloVolleyball	W 3-0 (25-22, 25–17, 25–20)	705	22-6
4/19; 4:30 p.m.	#2 UCLA^{(1)}	#7^{(4)}	Maples Pavilion; Stanford, CA (MPSF Semifinal)	FloVolleyball	L 0-3 (23-25, 19–25, 20–25)	457	22-7
5/4; 2 p.m.	#4 Long Beach State	#6	EagleBank Arena; Fairfax, VA (NCAA Quarterfinal)	ESPN+	L 1-3 (25–22, 17–25, 22–25, 23–25)		22-8

*-Indicates conference match. ^{(#)}-Indicates tournament seeding.
Times listed are Time in Arizona.

== Announcers for televised games ==
- Lindenwood: Houston Boe & Braden Dohrmann
- Lindenwood: Braden Dohrmann & Houston Boe
- George Mason: Josh Yourish
- Erskine:
- UC San Diego:
- Lees-McRae:
- Lees-McRae:
- UC Irvine:
- UC Irvine:
- Arizona Christian:
- USC:
- USC:
- Pepperdine:
- Pepperdine:
- BYU:
- BYU:
- Ball State:
- Olivet Nazarene:
- Princeton:
- Princeton:
- Concordia Irvine:
- Concordia Irvine:
- UCLA:
- UCLA:
- Stanford:
- Stanford:
- MPSF Tournament:

== Rankings ==
Ranking movements Legend: ██ Increase in ranking ██ Decrease in ranking
	Week																	
Poll	Pre	1	2	3	4	5	6	7	8	9	10	11	12	13	14	15	16	Final
AVCA Coaches	11	9	9	9	9	5	5	5	5	5	5	5	5	6	7	7	6	6
Off the Block Media	Not released		8	8	8	5	5	4	5	5	5	5	5	5	7	6		5

^The Media did not release a Pre-season or Week 1 poll.
