= 2010 NCAA men's volleyball tournament =

Tournament details
- Dates: May 2010
- Teams: 4

Final positions
- Champions: Stanford (2nd title)
- Runners-up: Penn State (6th title match)

Tournament statistics
- Matches played: 3
- Attendance: 10,395 (3,465 per match)

Awards
- Best player: Brad Lawson (Stanford); Kawika Shoji (Stanford)

The 2010 NCAA men's volleyball tournament was the 41st annual tournament to determine the national champion of NCAA men's collegiate indoor volleyball. The single elimination tournament was played at Maples Pavilion in Stanford, California during May 2010.

Stanford defeated Penn State in the final match, 3–0 (30–25, 30–20, 30–18), to win their second national title. The Cardinal (24–6) were coached by John Kosty.

Stanford's Brad Lawson and Kawika Shoji were named the tournament's Most Outstanding Players. Lawson and Shoji, along with five other players, comprised the All Tournament Team.

== Qualification ==
Until the creation of the NCAA Men's Division III Volleyball Championship in 2012, there was only a single national championship for men's volleyball. As such, all NCAA men's volleyball programs, whether from Division I, Division II, or Division III, were eligible. A total of 4 teams were invited to contest this championship.

Team	Appearance	Previous
Cal State Northridge	2nd	1993
Ohio State	17th	2009
Penn State	25th	2009
Stanford	4th	1997

== Tournament bracket ==
- Site: Maples Pavilion, Stanford, California

Semifinals
Penn State (3)	30	30	30
Cal State Northridge (0)	21	23	28
Stanford (3)	30	30	30
Ohio State (0)	25	26	17

Championship
Penn State (0)	25	20	18
Stanford (3)	30	30	30

== All tournament team ==
- Brad Lawson, Stanford (Co-Most outstanding player)
- Kawika Shoji, Stanford (Co-Most outstanding player)
- Max Lipsitz, Penn State
- Will Price, Penn State
- Evan Romero, Stanford
- Erik Shoji, Stanford
- Joe Sunder, Penn State
