= John Kosty =

American volleyball coach and player

Current position
- Title: The Birkhofer Family Men's Volleyball Head Coach
- Team: Stanford Cardinal
- Conference: Mountain Pacific Sports Federation
- Record: 217–184

Playing career
- 1985–1987: UC Santa Barbara Gauchos
- Position: Middle blocker

Coaching career (HC unless noted)
- 1991–2006: Stanford Cardinal (assistant)
- 2007–present: Stanford Cardinal

Head coaching record
- Overall: 217–184

Accomplishments and honors

Championships
- 2010 NCAA men's volleyball tournament

Awards
- AVCA Coach of the Year (2010); MPSF Coach of the Year (2010, 2014)

John Kosty is an American men's volleyball coach and former player. He's currently the head coach of the Stanford Cardinal men's volleyball team. He was named the 2010 AVCA Coach of the Year for leading Stanford to the 2010 NCAA men's volleyball tournament championship.

== Early life and education ==
Kosty, a Fountain Valley, California, native, attended Fountain Valley High School and played men's volleyball. He attended Golden West College for one year before enrolling at the University of California, Santa Barbara. While at UCSB, Kosty was a middle blocker for the UC Santa Barbara Gauchos men's volleyball team from 1985 to 1987 alongside teammate Jared Huffman. In just three seasons, Kosty found himself near the top of the Gaucho record books placing third in career solo blocks and third in single season solo blocks (1987). Kosty was named as an All-American in 1987.

== Coaching career ==
Kosty joined Stanford as an assistant coach in 1991. He served in that position under Ruben Nieves, then later Don Shaw.

With Kosty as head coach, the Stanford Cardinal won the 2010 NCAA men's volleyball tournament, the program's first since 1997 when he was an assistant coach.

Kosty was named the 2010 AVCA Coach of the Year in addition to being the 2010 and 2014 Mountain Pacific Sports Federation Coach of the Year.

== Honors ==
As head coach

- NCAA men's volleyball tournament: 2010
- AVCA Coach of the Year: 2010
- MPSF Coach of the Year: 2010, 2014

As assistant coach

- NCAA men's volleyball tournament: 1997
