= Burnham Pavilion (Stanford University) =

Building in Stanford, California, United States

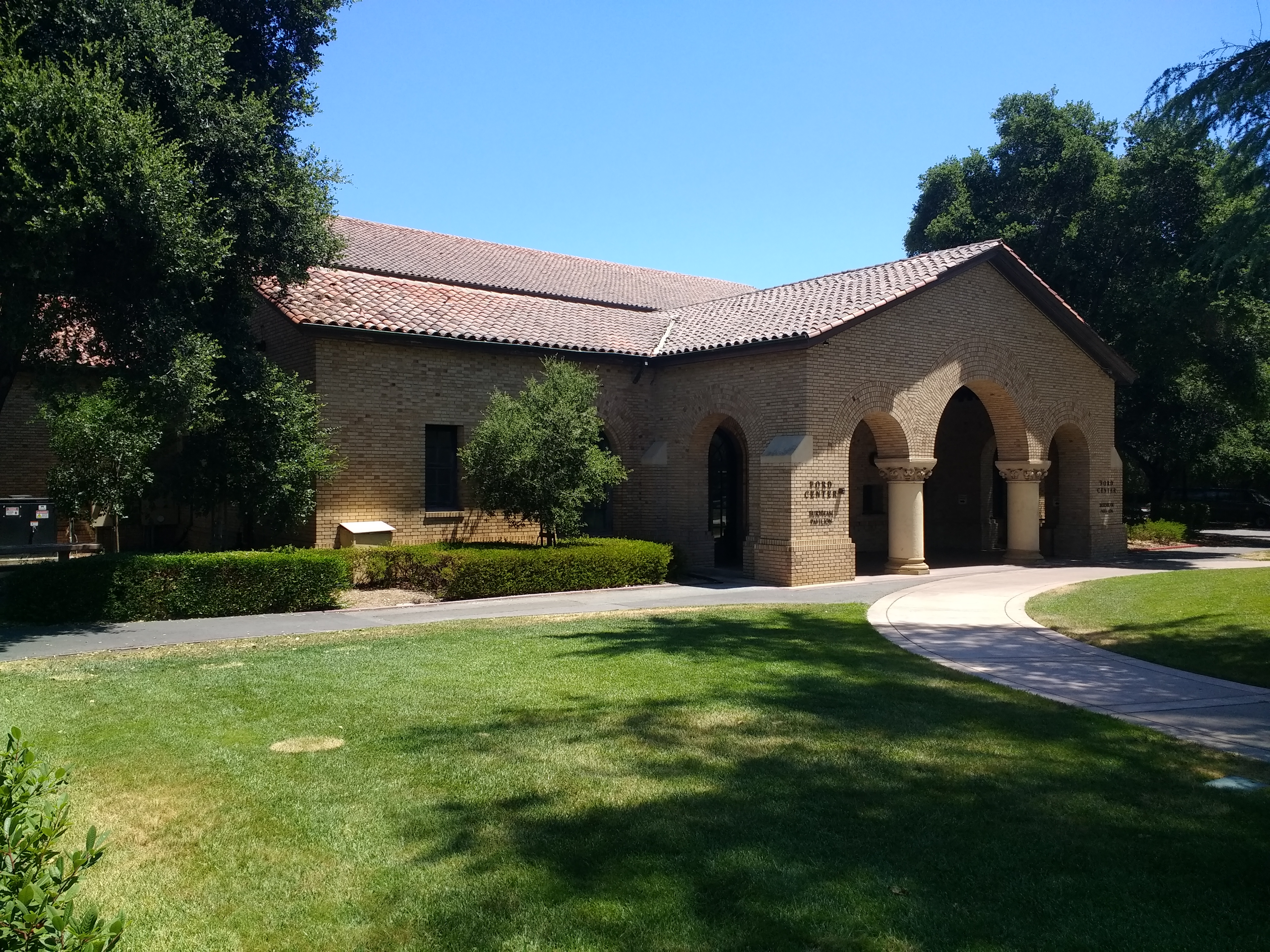
- Interactive map of Burnham Pavilion
- Former names: Stanford Pavilion; Old Pavilion
- Location: 615 Serra Street, Stanford, California
- Coordinates: 37°25′43″N 122°09′51″W
- Capacity: 1,436

Construction
- Opened: January 24, 1922
- Renovated: 1989

Tenant
- Stanford Cardinal

Burnham Pavilion is a multi-purpose arena in Stanford, California. It was built in 1921–22 at a cost of $153,000 by Bakewell and Brown and originally named the "Stanford Pavilion".

It was home to the Stanford University Cardinal basketball team prior to Maples Pavilion opening in 1968. When it opened, it was the largest arena used exclusively for basketball. On March 10, 1953, the Pavilion hosted a first-round NCAA Division I men's basketball tournament matchup between the University of Santa Clara and Hardin–Simmons University.

It was known for many years as the "Old Pavilion" but was renamed Burnham Pavilion in 1989 after Malin Burnham, a principal contributor to a renovation that increased capacity to 1,400. As of 2009, it houses the gymnastics teams, the wrestling team and the men's volleyball team.
