= 2023 NCAA men's volleyball tournament =

Men's college volleyball tournament

Tournament details
- Dates: April 30 – May 6
- Teams: 7

Final positions
- Champions: UCLA (20th title)
- Runners-up: Hawai'i

Tournament statistics
- Matches played: 6
- Attendance: 14,773 (2,462 per match)

Awards
- Most Outstanding Player: Alex Knight ^{(UCLA)}

The 2023 NCAA men's volleyball tournament was the 52nd edition of the NCAA men's volleyball tournament, an annual tournament to determine the national champion of NCAA Division I and Division II men's collegiate indoor volleyball. The single-elimination tournament began with three opening rounds matches. The entire tournament was hosted by the George Mason University from April 30 to May 6, 2023, at EagleBank Arena in Fairfax, Virginia.

All opening round matches were streamed on ESPN+. The semifinals were live on NCAA.com. ESPN2 has the National Championship on May 6 with ESPN+ simulcasting it. ESPN3 carried a Spanish language broadcast of the Championship for the first time in the Men's Tourney history.

The UCLA Bruins defeated Hawai'i to win the program's 20th national title. The win secured John Speraw his fourth national title as a head coach but his first national title at UCLA. He previously won 3 as head coach at UC Irvine. With the win, the Bruins have 121 NCAA National Championships, second only to Stanford.

== Bids ==
The tournament field was announced on NCAA.com Sunday, April 23, 2023, at 1 p.m. EDT.

School	Conference	Record	Berth	Source
Hawai'i	Big West	28–2	Tournament champion	
King	Conference Carolinas	16–15	Tournament champion	
Penn State	EIVA	26–3	Tournament champion	
Ohio State	MIVA	22–9	Tournament champion	
UCLA	MPSF	29–2	Tournament champion	
Long Beach State	Big West	20–4	At-large	
Grand Canyon	MPSF	20–7	At-large	

== Bracket ==
Opening Round; Sunday, April 30; ESPN+
6	Ohio State	3
7	King	0

Quarterfinals; Tuesday, May 2 ESPN+
4	Long Beach State	3
5	Grand Canyon	1
3	Penn State	3
6	Ohio State	1

Semifinals; Thursday, May 4 NCAA.com
1	UCLA	3
4	Long Beach State	0
2	Hawai'i	3
3	Penn State	2

National Championship; Saturday, May 6 ESPN2, ESPN+ (SAP)
1	UCLA	3
2	Hawai'i	1

== Schedule and results ==
All times Eastern.

Match	Time	Matchup	Score	Attendance	Broadcasters	Referees
Opening Round – Sunday, April 30
1	6:00 p.m.	Ohio State vs. King	3–0 (25–20, 25–16, 36–34)	1,910	Rob Espero & Jay Hosack	Ron Pelham, Devonie McLarty, Chad Zimmerman
Quarterfinals – Tuesday, May 2
2	5:00 p.m.	Long Beach State vs. Grand Canyon	3–1 (22–25, 25–17, 25–22, 25–23)	2,139	Rob Espero & Jay Hosack	Devonie McLarty, Ron Pelham, Chad Zimmerman
3	7:30 p.m.	Penn State vs. Ohio State	3–1 (25–22, 24–26, 25–13, 26–24)	2,139	Rob Espero & Jay Hosack	Chad Zimmerman, Devonie McLarty, Ron Pelham
Semifinals – Thursday, May 4
4	5:00 p.m.	UCLA vs. Long Beach State	3–0 (25–16, 25–14, 25–19)	3,782	Lincoln Rose & Jay Hosack	Chad Zimmerman, Ron Pelham, Devonie McLarty
5	7:30 p.m.	Hawai'i vs. Penn State	3–2 (25–20, 25–23, 16–25, 23–25, 15–10)	3,782	Lincoln Rose & Jay Hosack	Devonie McLarty, Chad Zimmerman, Ron Pelham
Championship – Saturday, May 6
6	5:00 p.m.	UCLA vs. Hawai'i	3–1 (28–26, 31–33, 25–21, 25–21)	6,942	Paul Sunderland & Kevin Barnett (ESPN2); Rigoberto Plascencia & Alex Pombo (ESPN3 SAP)	Ron Pelham, Devonie McLarty, Chad Zimmerman

== All Tournament Team ==
- Jakob Thelle, Hawai’i
- Brett Wildman, Penn State
- Mason Briggs, Long Beach State
- Dimitrios Mouchlias, Hawai’i
- Ido David, UCLA
- Troy Gooch, UCLA
- Alex Knight, UCLA (Most Outstanding Player)
