= Shawn Olmstead =

American volleyball coach

Current position
- Title: Head coach
- Team: BYU men's
- Conference: MPSF
- Record: 199–78

Biographical details
- Born: Carpinteria, California, U.S.

Playing career
- 2001–2004: BYU men's
- Position: Libero

Coaching career (HC unless noted)
- 2005: Cal Poly (assistant)
- 2006–2007: Utah State (assistant)
- 2008–2010: BYU women's (assistant)
- 2011–2015: BYU women's
- 2016–present: BYU men's

Head coaching record
- Overall: 199–78 (men's); 103–25 (women's)
- Tournaments: Men's; 4–4 (NCAA) Women's; 9–3 (NCAA Division I)

Accomplishments and honors

Championships
- Men's; 5 MPSF regular season (2016–2018, 2020–2021); 3 MPSF tournament (2016, 2018, 2021) Women's; 2 WCC regular season (2012, 2014)

Awards
- Women's; AVCA Coach of the Year (2014)

Shawn Olmstead is an American college volleyball coach. He is the head coach for the BYU Cougars men's volleyball team, a position he had held since the 2016 season. Olmstead served as head coach for the BYU Cougars women's volleyball from 2011 to 2014. In 2014, he was named the American Volleyball Coaches Association (AVCA) Coach of the Year. His sister, Heather Olmstead, coached the BYU Cougars women's volleyball team until December 11, 2025, when she resigned from the position.

== Early life, family, and playing career ==
Olmstead is one of seven children born to parents Rick and Trudy Olmstead and is the only boy in the family. Olmstead is a member of the Church of Jesus Christ of Latter-day Saints and served a mission for the Church in Mendoza, Argentina from 1997 to 1999. Olmstead is married to former Cougar Farrah Hofheins, and they have three daughters and a son.

=== High school ===
Olmstead attended Carpinteria High School for four years. Prior to his junior year he played club volleyball in Santa Barbara because Carpinteria didn't have a boys volleyball team. During his junior year he helped start the boys volleyball team. He went on to be a two-year starter and was awarded an MVP award. He also set a school record for kills in a single match.

=== College ===
After graduating from Carpinteria High School, Olmstead was brought to BYU where he played on the BYU Cougars men's volleyball team from 2000 until 2004 while majoring in Spanish Education with a minor in Sociology. During three of his four seasons BYU made the national championship, winning it twice in 2001 and 2004. During his senior season Olmstead started at libero, recorded the third-most digs in a single season (230) in school history, and earned Mountain Pacific Sports Federation All-Tournament honors.

=== Coaching career ===
After graduating from BYU in 2004, Olmstead joined the coaching staff at California Polytechnic State University, San Luis Obispo, where he also served as recruiting coordinator. During that lone season, in 2005 he helped turn the Mustangs from a 5–24 team to a 19–6 record. The following April, Olmstead moved back to Utah, where he joined the coaching staff at Utah State University for two seasons.

In 2008, Olmstead returned to BYU to help revitalize the women's volleyball team. After four years Olmstead, was offered the position of head coach when Shay Goulding resigned. He agreed upon the condition that his sister, Heather. be allowed to come on as his assistant. The two worked together for four seasons until he moved over to the men's team.

During his time as head coach, Olmstead has led BYU to the national championship match four times (one women's, three men's) as well as coached numerous All-Americans. He attributes the success to being willing to learn.

== Head coaching record ==
=== Women's ===
Record table
Season	Team	Overall	Conference	Standing	Postseason
BYU Cougars (West Coast Conference) (2011–2014)
2011	BYU	21–9	10–6	3rd	
2012	BYU	28–4	13–3	1st	NCAA Division I Sweet Sixteen
2013	BYU	24–7	15–3	2nd	NCAA Division I Sweet Sixteen
2014	BYU	30–5	16–2	1st	NCAA Division I Runner-up
BYU:		103–25 (.805)	54–14 (.794)		
Total:		103–25 (.805)			
National champion Postseason invitational champion Conference regular season champion Conference regular season and conference tournament champion Division regular season champion Division regular season and conference tournament champion Conference tournament champion

=== Men's ===
Record table
Season	Team	Overall	Conference	Standing	Postseason
BYU Cougars (Mountain Pacific Sports Federation) (2016–present)
2016	BYU	27–4	19–3	1st	National Runner-up
2017	BYU	26–5	16–2	T–1st	NCAA Runner-up
2018	BYU	22–7	10–2	1st	NCAA Final Four
2019	BYU	13–12	6–6	T–4th	
2020	BYU	17–1	6–0	1st	No tournament—COVID-19 pandemic
2021	BYU	20–4	17–3	1st	NCAA Runner-up
2022	BYU	8–17	3–9	T–6th	
2023	BYU	19–7	8–4	2nd	
2024	BYU	16–9	7–5	3rd	
2025	BYU	19–10	7–5	T–3rd	
2026	BYU	12–2	2–0		
BYU:		199–78 (.718)	101–39 (.721)		
Total:		199–78 (.718)			
National champion Postseason invitational champion Conference regular season champion Conference regular season and conference tournament champion Division regular season champion Division regular season and conference tournament champion Conference tournament champion
