= 2017 BYU Cougars men's volleyball team =

University sports team

2017 BYU Cougars men's volleyball

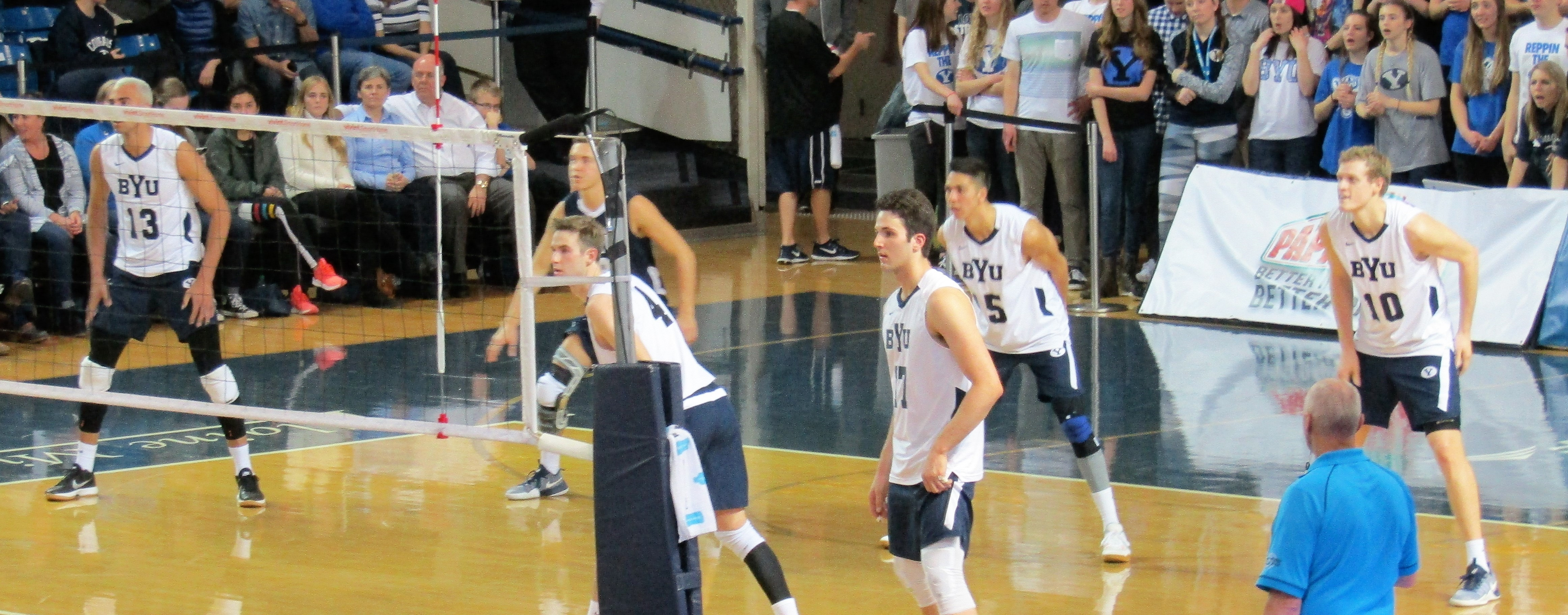

NCAA Tournament 3–seed, L, Final 3–0
- Conference: Mountain Pacific Sports Federation
- Record: 26-5 (16-2 MPSF)
- Head coach: Shawn Olmstead (2nd season)
- Assistant coaches: Luka Slabe (2nd season); Jaylen Reyes (2nd season)
- Home arena: Smith Fieldhouse

2017 Mountain Pacific Sports Federation men's volleyball standings
	Conf.				Overall
Team	W		L	PCT	W		L	PCT
No. 3 Long Beach State ‍‍‍	16	–	2	.889	27	–	4	.871
No. 2 BYU ‍‍‍	16	–	2	.889	26	–	5	.839
No. 4 Hawaiʻi ‍‍‍	14	–	4	.778	27	–	6	.818
No. 5 UC Irvine ‍‍‍	13	–	5	.722	20	–	7	.741
No. 6 UCLA ‍‍‍	10	–	8	.556	17	–	10	.630
No. 8 Pepperdine ‍‍‍	8	–	10	.444	10	–	12	.455
No. 9 Stanford ‍‍‍	8	–	10	.444	13	–	13	.500
No. 11 USC ‍‍‍	8	–	10	.444	14	–	14	.500
No. 15 CSUN ‍‍‍	5	–	13	.278	12	–	15	.444
UCSB ‍‍‍	5	–	13	.278	10	–	16	.385
UC San Diego ‍‍‍	3	–	15	.167	7	–	19	.269
Cal Baptist ‍‍‍	2	–	16	.111	7	–	21	.250
† – Conference champion y – Invited to the NCAA tournament Rankings from AVCA

The 2017 BYU Cougars men's volleyball team represented Brigham Young University in the 2017 NCAA Division I & II men's volleyball season. The Cougars, led by second year head coach Shawn Olmstead, played their home games at Smith Fieldhouse. The Cougars were members of the MPSF and were picked to win the MPSF in the preseason poll. They reached the NCAA National Championship for the second year in a row before being swept by Ohio State. The Cougars finished the year ranked #2 in the nation.

== Season highlights ==
- Will be filled in as the season progresses.

== Roster ==
2017 BYU Cougars roster
Defensive specialist/libero: 7 Taylor Richards - Sophomore; 8 Erik Sikes - Junior; 22 Mitchel Worthington - Freshman; Middle blockers: 1 Price Jarman - Junior; 17 Joseph Grosh - Senior; 19 Miki Jauhiainen - Freshman; 20 Sam Cagle - Freshman; 21 Christian Rupert - RS Sophomore	Outside hitters: 5 Kiril Meretev - Senior; 6 Zach Eschenberg - Freshman; 10 Jake Langolis - Senior; 14 Storm Fa'agata-Tufuga - Freshman; 15 Brenden Sander - Junior; 24 Tanner Skabelund - RS Freshman	Opposite hitters: 2 Jacob Komenda - Freshman; 13 Ben Patch - Junior; 16 Tim Dobbert - RS Junior; Setters: 3 Wil Stanley - Freshman; 4 Leo Durkin - Junior; 9 Andrew Lincoln - Freshman

== Schedule ==
TV/Internet Streaming/Radio information:

BYU Radio will simulcast most BYUtv games with the BYUtv feed.
Campus Insiders TheW.tv will air select games when BYUtv has basketball commitments. These games will not be aired on BYU Radio.

Date time	Opponent	Rank	Arena city (tournament)	Television	Score	Attendance	Record (MPSF record)
1/6; 6 p.m.	#6 Lewis	#3	Neil Carey Arena; Romeoville, IL	GLVC SN	W 3–0 (27–25, 27–25, 25–22)	981	1–0
1/7; 6 p.m.	#11 Loyola-Chicago	#3	Joseph J. Gentile Arena; Chicago, IL	ESPN3	L 3–1 (25–20, 25–22, 22–25, 33–31)	604	1–1
1/12; 7 p.m.	McKendree	#4	Smith Fieldhouse; Provo, UT	TheW.tv	W 3–0 (25–16, 25–19, 25–20)	1,830	2–1
1/13; 7 p.m.	Concordia-Irvine	#4	Smith Fieldhouse; Provo, UT	TheW.tv	W 3–0 (25–23, 25–17, 26–24)	2,814	3–1
1/14; 7 p.m.	McKendree	#4	Smith Fieldhouse; Provo, UT	BYUtv	W 3–0 (25–23, 25–22, 25–17)	2,665	4–1
1/19; 8 p.m.	CSUN*	#3	Matadome; Northridge, CA	Matador SN	W 3–1 (23–25, 25–20, 25–17, 25–15)	598	5–1 (1–0)
1/20; 8 p.m.	CSUN*	#3	Matadome; Northridge, CA	Matador SN	W 3–1 (26–24, 25–15, 22–25, 26–24)	489	6–1 (2–0)
1/27; 7 p.m.	#7 UC Irvine*	#3	Smith Fieldhouse; Provo, UT	BYUtv	L 3–2 (25–23, 28–26, 32–34, 21–25, 15–12)	3,029	6–2 (2–1)
1/28; 7 p.m.	#7 UC Irvine	#3	Smith Fieldhouse; Provo, UT	TheW.tv	W 3–0 (25–21, 25–18, 28–26)	2,636	7–2
2/3; 7 p.m.	#2 UCLA*	#4	Smith Fieldhouse; Provo, UT	BYUtv	W 3–2 (28–26, 25–23, 13–25, 22–25, 18–16)	4,047	8–2 (3–1)
2/4; 7 p.m.	#2 UCLA*	#4	Smith Fieldhouse; Provo, UT	TheW.tv	W 3–0 (25–13, 25–23, 31–29)	4,582	9–2 (4–1)
2/10; 8 p.m.	USC*	#3	Galen Center; Los Angeles, CA	P12 USC	W 3–0 (27–25, 25–17, 25–16)	700	10–2 (5–1)
2/17; 7 p.m.	UC San Diego*	#3	Smith Fieldhouse; Provo, UT	BYUtv	W 3–0 (25–21, 26–24, 25–23)	3,878	11–2 (6–1)
2/18; 6 p.m.	UC San Diego	#3	Smith Fieldhouse; Provo, UT	BYUtv	W 3–0 (27–25, 25–21, 25–22)	3,707	12–2
2/23; 8 p.m.	#8 Stanford*	#3	Maples Pavilion; Stanford, CA	P12 BAY	W 3–0 (25–21, 25–20, 25–21)	550	13–2 (7–1)
2/24; 8 p.m.	#8 Stanford*	#3	Maples Pavilion; Stanford, CA	P12 STAN	W 3–1 (25–19, 23–25, 25–23, 26–24)	1,339	14–2 (8–1)
3/3; 7 p.m.	Cal Baptist*	#3	Smith Fieldhouse; Provo, UT	TheW.tv	W 3–1 (25–16, 25–17, 28–30, 25–15)	4,142	15–2 (9–1)
3/10; 8 p.m.	#9 Pepperdine*	#3	Firestone Fieldhouse; Malibu, CA	TheW.tv	W 3–0 (25–23, 25–23, 25–17)	637	16–2 (10–1)
3/11; 8 p.m.	#9 Pepperdine*	#3	Firestone Fieldhouse; Malibu, CA	TheW.tv	W 3–0 (25–22, 25–22, 26–24)	942	17–2 (11–1)
3/17; 7 p.m.	#4 Hawai'i*	#3	Smith Fieldhouse; Provo, UT	BYUtv	W 3–0 (28–26, 25–18, 25–20)	4,544	18–2 (12–1)
3/18; 7 p.m.	#4 Hawai'i*	#3	Smith Fieldhouse; Provo, UT	BYUtv	W 3–0 (25–19, 25–23, 28–26)	3,555	19–2 (13–1)
3/21; 7 p.m.	Princeton	#3	Smith Fieldhouse; Provo, UT	BYUtv	W 3–0 (25–23, 25–23, 21–25, 25–18)	2,160	20–2
3/24; 7 p.m.	#1 Long Beach State*	#3	Smith Fieldhouse; Provo, UT	BYUtv	W 3–2 (20–25, 26–24, 25–20, 21–25, 17–15)	5,213	21–2 (14–1)
3/25; 8 p.m.	#1 Long Beach State*	#3	Smith Fieldhouse; Provo, UT	BYUtv	L 3–0 (25–21, 25–22, 25–21)	5,783	21–3 (14–2)
4/6; 8 p.m.	UC Santa Barbara*	#3	Robertson Gymnasium; Goleta, CA	Stretch Internet	W 3–1 (24–26, 25–23, 25–16, 25–15)	500	22–3 (15–2)
4/7; 8 p.m.	UC Santa Barbara*	#3	Robertson Gymnasium; Goleta, CA	Stretch Internet	W 3–0 (25–22, 25–14, 25–21)	1,150	23–3 (16–2)
4/15; 7 p.m.	#9 Stanford*	#3	Smith Fieldhouse; Provo, UT (MPSF Quarterfinal)	BYUtv	W 3–0 (25–19, 25–21, 25–18)	2,982	24–3
4/20; 6 p.m.	vs. #4 Hawai'i*	#3	Walter Pyramid; Long Beach, CA (MPSF Semifinal)	Flo Volleyball	L 3–0 (25–22, 25–23, 25–22)	2,489	24–4
5/02; 4 p.m.	vs. Barton College	#4	St. John Arena; Columbus, OH (NCAA Play-in)	Buckeye Vision	W 3–0 (25–19, 25–11, 25–15)	695	25–4
5/04; 4 p.m.	vs. #1 Long Beach State	#4	St. John Arena; Columbus, OH (NCAA Semifinal)	NCAA.com	W 3–0 (25–20, 25–18, 25–23)	4,834	26–4
5/06; 5 p.m.	vs. #2 Ohio State	#4	St. John Arena; Columbus, OH (NCAA Championship)	ESPN2	L 3–0 (25–19, 25–20, 25–22)	8,205	26–5

*-Indicates conference match.
Times listed are Mountain Time Zone.

== Announcers for televised games ==
- Lewis: No commentary
- Loyola-Chicago: Jason Goch & Ray Gooden
- McKendree: Dave Neely
- Concordia-Irvine: Dave Neely
- McKendree: Jarom Jordan, Steve Vail, & Lauren Francom
- CSUN: No commentary
- CSUN: No commentary
- UC Irvine: Jarom Jordan, Steve Vail, & Lauren Francom
- UC Irvine: Dave Neely
- UCLA: Jarom Jordan, Steve Vail, & Lauren Francom
- UCLA: Robbie Bullough & Dave Neely
- USC: Paul Duchesne & Paul Yoder
- UC San Diego: Jarom Jordan, Steve Vail, & Lauren Francom
- UC San Diego: Jarom Jordan, Steve Vail, & Lauren Francom
- Stanford: Kevin Barnett & Don Shaw
- Stanford: No commentary
- Cal Baptist: Robbie Bullough & Dave Neely
- Pepperdine: Al Epstein
- Pepperdine: Al Epstein
- Hawai'i: Jarom Jordan, Steve Vail, & Lauren Francom
- Hawai'i: Jarom Jordan, Steve Vail, & Lauren Francom
- Princeton: Jarom Jordan, Steve Vail, & Lauren Francom
- Long Beach State: Jarom Jordan, Steve Vail, & Lauren Francom
- Long Beach State: Jarom Jordan, Steve Vail, & Lauren Francom
- UC Santa Barbara: No commentary
- UC Santa Barbara: No commentary
- Stanford: Jarom Jordan, Steve Vail, & Lauren Francom
- Hawai'i: Rob Espero & Nate Ngo
- Barton: No commentary
- Long Beach State: Ralph Bednarczyk
- Ohio State: Paul Sunderland & Kevin Barnett
