= 2015 BYU Cougars men's volleyball team =

American college volleyball season

2015 BYU Cougars men's volleyball
- Conference: Mountain Pacific Sports Federation
- Record: 17–10 (14–8 MPSF)
- Head coach: Chris McGown (4th season)
- Assistant coaches: Rob Neilson (8th season); Mike Wilton (7th season); Carl McGown (4th season)
- Home arena: Smith Fieldhouse

The 2015 BYU Cougars men's volleyball team represented Brigham Young University in the 2015 NCAA Division I men's volleyball season. The Cougars, led by fourth year head coach Chris McGown, played their home games at Smith Fieldhouse. The Cougars were members of the MPSF and were picked to finish sixth in the preseason poll. The Cougars finished the season 14–8 in conference play, good for fifth in the conference. They were eliminated in the first round of the MPSF Playoffs and did not make the NCAA Tournament.

2015 Mountain Pacific Sports Federation men's volleyball standings
	Conf.				Overall
Team	W		L	PCT	W		L	PCT
No. 3 UC Irvine ‍†‍‍^{y}	19	–	3	.864	28	–	5	.848
No. 6 Hawaiʻi ‍‍‍^{y}	18	–	4	.818	24	–	7	.774
No. 5 Pepperdine ‍‍‍	17	–	5	.773	24	–	6	.800
No. 7 USC ‍‍‍	15	–	7	.682	19	–	9	.679
No. 8 BYU ‍‍‍	14	–	8	.636	17	–	10	.630
No. 9 UC Santa Barbara ‍‍‍	13	–	9	.591	17	–	10	.630
No. 11 Long Beach State ‍‍‍	11	–	11	.500	15	–	13	.536
No. 12 UCLA ‍‍‍	9	–	13	.409	13	–	14	.481
No. 13 CSUN ‍‍‍	7	–	15	.318	10	–	18	.357
No. 14 Stanford ‍‍‍	7	–	15	.318	10	–	18	.357
Cal Baptist ‍‍‍	2	–	20	.091	6	–	22	.214
UC San Diego ‍‍‍	0	–	22	.000	2	–	26	.071
† – Conference champion y – Invited to the NCAA tournament Rankings from AVCA

== Season highlights ==
- BYU began the season looking to replace Taylor Sander, a three-time All-American who was BYU's best attacker, best passer, and best server. Sander led BYU to the Final Four twice and to 3-consecutive MPSF Championship matches. Josue Rivera, who was second on the team in kills in 2014, comes in a little dinged after having off-season shoulder surgery. 3 starters return from the 2014 team: Rivera, Michael Hatch, and Jaylen Reyes. These three are largely expected to make-up Sander's production along with some newcomers.

== Roster ==
2015 BYU Cougars roster
Defensive specialist/libero: 3 Evan Chang - Junior; 8 Erik Sikes - Freshman; 12 Jaylen Reyes - Senior; Middle blockers: 1 Price Jarman - Freshman; 17 Joseph Grosh - Sophomore; 21 Christian Rupert - Freshman; 23 Michael Hatch - Junior	Outside hitters: 5 Kiril Meretev - Sophomore; 6 Josue Rivera - Senior; 7 Phil Fuchs - Senior; 10 Jake Langolis - Sophomore; 14 Tyler Hutchins - Junior; 15 Brenden Sander - Freshman	Opposite hitters: 2 Carson Heninger - Junior; 11 Matt Underwood - Junior; 16 Tim Dobbert - Sophomore; Setters: 4 Leo Durkin - Freshman; 9 Tyler Heap - Junior; 18 Robbie Sutton - Junior; 22 Chandler Gibb - Freshman

== Schedule ==
BYU Radio will simulcast all BYUtv games with the BYUtv feed.

Date Time	Opponent	Rank	Arena City (Tournament)	Television	Score	Attendance	Record (MPSF record)
1/9; 6 p.m.	vs. #2 Loyola-Chicago	#6	Maples Pavilion; Stanford, CA	Pac-12 Digital	L 3-1 (25-17, 25-21, 22-25, 25-23)	483	0-1
1/10; 5:30 p.m.	vs. #9 Lewis	#6	Maples Pavilion; Stanford, CA	Pac-12 Digital	W 3-2 (25-22, 25-18, 20-25, 24-26, 15-11)	623	1-1
1/16; 7 p.m.	#4 UCLA	#7	Smith Fieldhouse; Provo, UT	BYUtv	W 3-0 (25-12, 25-17, 25-17)	4,105	2-1 (1-0)
1/17; 7 p.m.	#4 UCLA	#7	Smith Fieldhouse; Provo, UT	BYUtv	W 3-1 (17-25, 26-24, 25-20, 25-15)	3,961	3-1 (2-0)
1/23; 8 p.m.	@ #8 UC Santa Barbara	#4	Robertson Gymnasium; Goleta, CA		L 3-0 (21-25, 18-25, 22-25)	380	3-2 (2-1)
1/24; 8 p.m.	@ #8 UC Santa Barbara	#4	Robertson Gymnasium; Goleta, CA		W 3-2 (25-20, 25-19, 19-25, 19-25, 15-13)	625	4-2 (3-1)
1/30; 7 p.m.	UC San Diego	#7	Smith Fieldhouse; Provo, UT	BYUtv	W 3-0 (25-18, 25-17, 25-18)	3,415	5-2 (4-1)
1/31; 7 p.m.	UC San Diego	#7	Smith Fieldhouse; Provo, UT		W 3-0 (25-18, 25-20, 25-21)	2,463	6-2 (5-1)
2/6; 7 p.m.	Cal Baptist	#7	Smith Fieldhouse; Provo, UT	BYUtv	W 3-1 (23-25, 25-18, 25-10, 25-15)	3,041	7-2 (6-1)
2/7; 7 p.m.	Cal Baptist	#7	Smith Fieldhouse; Provo, UT	BYUtv	W 3-0 (25-18, 25-20, 25-20)	3,106	8-2 (7-1)
2/12; 8 p.m.	@ #2 USC	#7	Galen Center; Los Angeles, CA	Pac-12 Digital	L 3-2 (20-25, 21-25, 25-16, 25-23, 16-14)	900	8-3 (7-2)
2/13; 8 p.m.	@ #2 USC	#7	Galen Center; Los Angeles, CA	Pac-12 Digital	W 3-1 (25-20, 25-19, 23-25, 25-19)	1,500	9-3 (8-2)
2/20; 7 p.m.	#9 Long Beach State	#5	Smith Fieldhouse; Provo, UT	BYUtv	W 3-0 (25-22, 25-16, 25-22)	3,337	10-3 (9-2)
2/21; 7 p.m.	#9 Long Beach State	#5	Smith Fieldhouse; Provo, UT	BYUtv	W 3-1 (26-28, 25-23, 25-18, 25-23)	3,299	11-3 (10-2)
2/27; 7 p.m.	#13 Ball State	#4	Smith Fieldhouse; Provo, UT	BYUtv	W 3-0 (25-22, 25-19, 25-23)	2,675	12-3
2/28; 7 p.m.	#13 Ball State	#4	Smith Fieldhouse; Provo, UT	BYUtv	W 3-0 (25-23, 25-23, 25-19)	2,890	13-3
3/6; 8 p.m.	@ Stanford	#4	Maples Pavilion; Stanford, CA	Pac-12 Digital	L 3-1 (25-21, 19-25, 16-25, 18-25)	779	13-4 (10-3)
3/7; 8 p.m.	@ Stanford	#4	Maples Pavilion; Stanford, CA	Pac-12 Digital	L 3-1 (21-25, 26-24, 24-26, 18-25)	1,055	13-5 (10-4)
3/20; 8 p.m.	@ #4 Pepperdine	#6	Firestone Fieldhouse; Malibu, CA	WavesCast	L 3-2 (23-25, 26-24, 25-27, 25-13, 15-13)	1,188	13-6 (10-5)
3/21; 8 p.m.	@ #4 Pepperdine	#6	Firestone Fieldhouse; Malibu, CA	WavesCast	L 3-1 (24-26, 17-25, 25-23, 25-27)	1,454	13-7 (10-6)
3/27; 7 p.m.	#5 UC Irvine	#6	Smith Fieldhouse; Provo, UT	BYUtv	L 3-1 (25-20, 19-25, 27-29, 23-25)	3,962	13-8 (10-7)
3/28; 8 p.m.	#5 UC Irvine	#6	Smith Fieldhouse; Provo, UT	BYUtv	L 3-1 (25-23, 22-25, 19-25, 18-25)	3,610	13-9 (10-8)
4/10; 8 p.m.	@ #13 Cal State Northridge	#6	Matadome; Northridge, CA	Matador TV	W 3-0 (28-26, 25-21, 25-15)	309	14-9 (11-8)
4/11; 8 p.m.	@ #13 Cal State Northridge	#6	Matadome; Northridge, CA	Matador TV	W 3-0 (26-24, 25-23, 25-22)	594	15-9 (12-8)
4/17; 7 p.m.	#1 Hawaiʻi	#6	Smith Fieldhouse; Provo, UT	BYUtv	W 3-1 (27-25, 25-21, 21-25, 25-17)	3,780	16-9 (13-8)
4/18; 7 p.m.	#1 Hawaiʻi	#6	Smith Fieldhouse; Provo, UT	BYUtv	W 3-2 (22-25, 25-21, 23-25, 25-18, 15-13)	3,953	17-9 (14-8)
4/25; 8 p.m.	@ #8 USC	#6	Galen Center; Los Angeles, CA (MPSF Quarterfinal)	Pac-12 Digital	L 3-2 (17-25, 25-20, 22-25, 25-23, 13-15)	2,000	17–10

y-Indicates NCAA Playoffs
Times listed are Mountain Time Zone.

== Announcers for televised games ==
- vs. Loyola: No announcers
- vs. Lewis: No announcers
- UCLA: Jarom Jordan, Steve Vail, & Lauren Francom
- UCLA: Jarom Jordan, Steve Vail, & Lauren Francom
- UC San Diego: Jarom Jordan & Steve Vail
- Cal Baptist: Jarom Jordan, Steve Vail, & Lauren Francom
- Cal Baptist: Jarom Jordan, Steve Vail, & Lauren Francom
- @ USC: Mark Beltran & Paul Duchesne
- @ USC: Mark Beltran & Paul Duchesne
- Long Beach State: Jarom Jordan & Steve Vail
- Long Beach State: Jarom Jordan, Steve Vail, & Lauren Francom
- Ball State: Spencer Linton & Steve Vail
- Ball State: Spencer Linton & Steve Vail
- @ Stanford: No announcers
- @ Stanford: No announcers
- @ Pepperdine: Al Epstein
- @ Pepperdine: Al Epstein
- UC Irvine: Jarom Jordan, Steve Vail, & Lauren Francom
- UC Irvine: Jarom Jordan, Steve Vail, & Lauren Francom
- @ Cal State Northridge: No announcers
- @ Cal State Northridge: No announcers
- Hawai′i: Jarom Jordan, Steve Vail, & Lauren Francom
- Hawai′i: Jarom Jordan, Steve Vail, & Lauren Francom
- @ USC: Mark Beltran
