= BYU Cougars men's volleyball =

American college volleyball team

- Founded: 1990
- University: Brigham Young University
- Athletic director: Brian Santiago
- Head coach: Shawn Olmstead (12th season)
- Conference: MPSF
- Location: Provo, Utah, US
- Home arena: George Albert Smith Fieldhouse (capacity: 5,000)
- Nickname: Cougars
- Colors: Blue and white

NCAA tournament champion
- 1999, 2001, 2004

NCAA tournament runner-up
- 2003, 2013, 2016, 2017, 2021

NCAA tournament semifinal
- 1999, 2001, 2003, 2004, 2013, 2014, 2016, 2017, 2018, 2021

NCAA tournament appearance
- 1999, 2001, 2003, 2004, 2013, 2014, 2016, 2017, 2018, 2021

Conference tournament champion
- Mountain Pacific Sports Federation; 1999, 2003, 2004, 2013, 2014, 2016, 2018, 2021

Conference regular season champion
- Mountain Pacific Sports Federation; 1999, 2001, 2003, 2004, 2013, 2014, 2016, 2017, 2018, 2021

The BYU Cougars men's volleyball team is the men's college volleyball program representing Brigham Young University (BYU) in Provo, Utah. The Cougars began male collegiate volleyball competition in 1990 and have won 3 national championships and 10 conference championships.

== History ==
The program was officially sanctioned in 1990 under the leadership of Carl McGown. BYU's first NCAA title came in 1999, when they finished the season 30–1 and swept Long Beach State to win the championship. In 2001, the team captured its second title in three years by defeating UCLA in a 3-0 sweep. Following McGown’s retirement, Tom Peterson took over and led the team back to the championship in 2004, where the team defeated Long Beach State in five sets in Honolulu to claim their third national title. Setter Carlos Moreno was named the AVCA National Player of the Year, the first in program history. After a few transitional years, Carl McGown’s son, Chris McGown, took the helm. He led the team back to national prominence, fueled by the arrival of superstar Taylor Sander, who became a four-time First Team All-American and the 2014 AVCA Player of the Year. Under Chris McGown, the team reached the NCAA Finals in 2013 and consistently won MPSF regular-season titles.

In 2016, Shawn Olmstead, who previously led the BYU women’s team to a national final, moved to the men’s side. His tenure has been marked by high-level consistency and several near-misses at the national title, ending their 2016, 2017, and 2021 seasons as the NCAA runners up. The 2020 team was also ranked No. 1 in the nation before the season was abruptly cancelled due to the COVID-19 pandemic.

As of 2025, the Cougars have been ranked in the AVCA Division I WVB Coaches Poll 572 times since it was started in 1986, including 506 Top 10 rankings and 76 rankings at #1. The team has finished their season ranked 33 times, including 29 times in the Top 10, 18 times in the Top 5, and 3 times as the #1.

BYU's men's volleyball team is the only program outside of California or Hawaii to win multiple NCAA titles.

== Venue ==
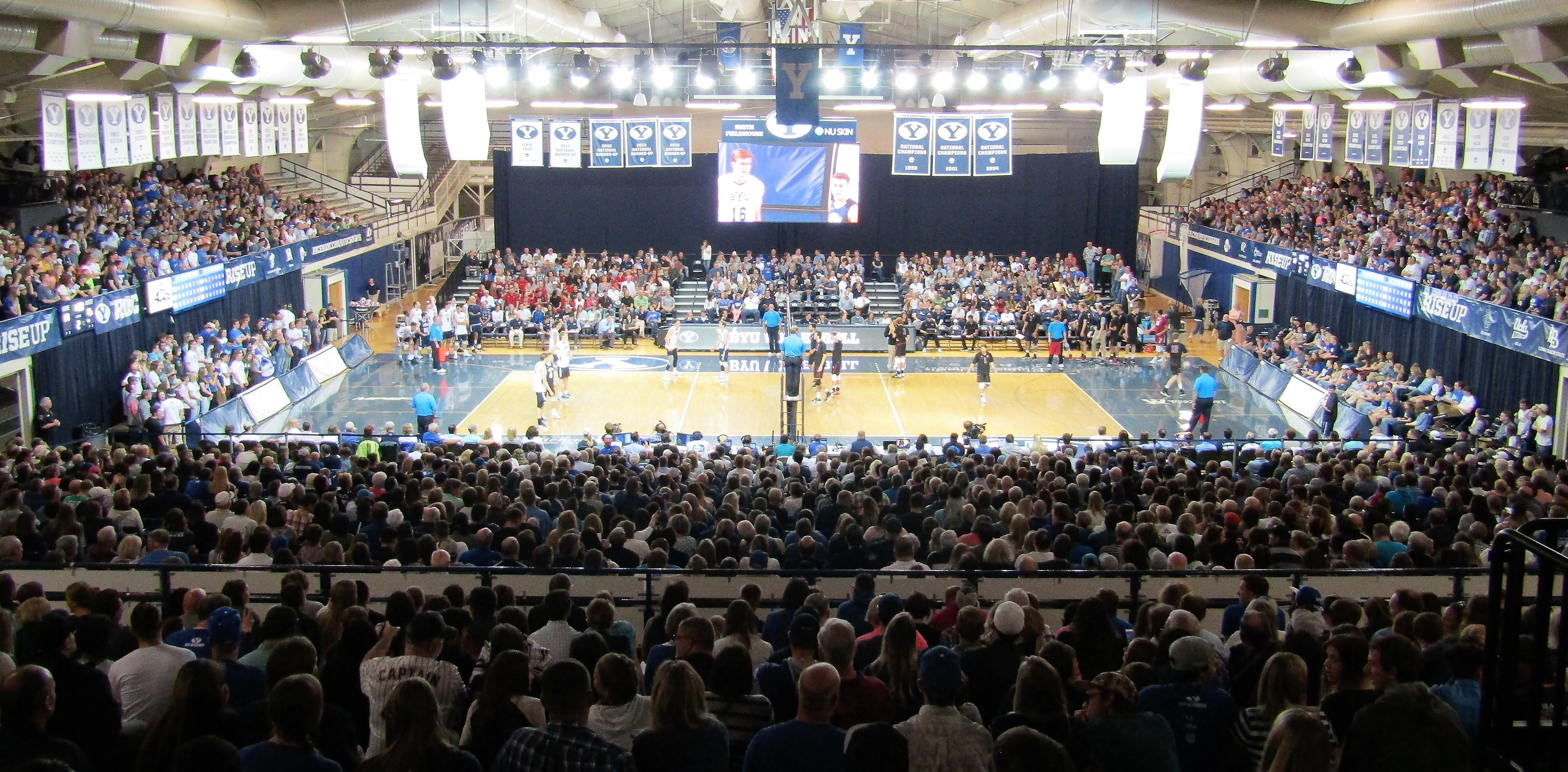
A BYU match at the Smith Fieldhouse in 2017

The Cougars regularly play home matches at the Smith Fieldhouse, which is the seventh largest venue for college volleyball in the United States. The team's largest home game attendance on record was 6,119 in 2001 against No. 1 UCLA. On a few occasions, home matches have been played at BYU's Marriott Center. On Feb. 19, 1999, the Cougars defeated Hawai’i, 3-1, in front of 14,156 fans in the Marriott Center to set the NCAA single-match attendance record.

== Coaches ==
Name	Career	Record	Pct.
Carl McGown	1990–2002	205–131	.610
Tom Peterson	2003–2006	90–30	.750
Shawn Patchell	2007–2010	87–33	.725
Rob Neilson	2011	20–8	.714
Chris McGowan	2012–2015	88–31	.739
Shawn Olmstead	2016–present	208–88	.703

Two coaches have been named the AVCA National Coach of the Year: Carl McGown (1999 and 2001) and Chris McGown (2013).

== Players ==
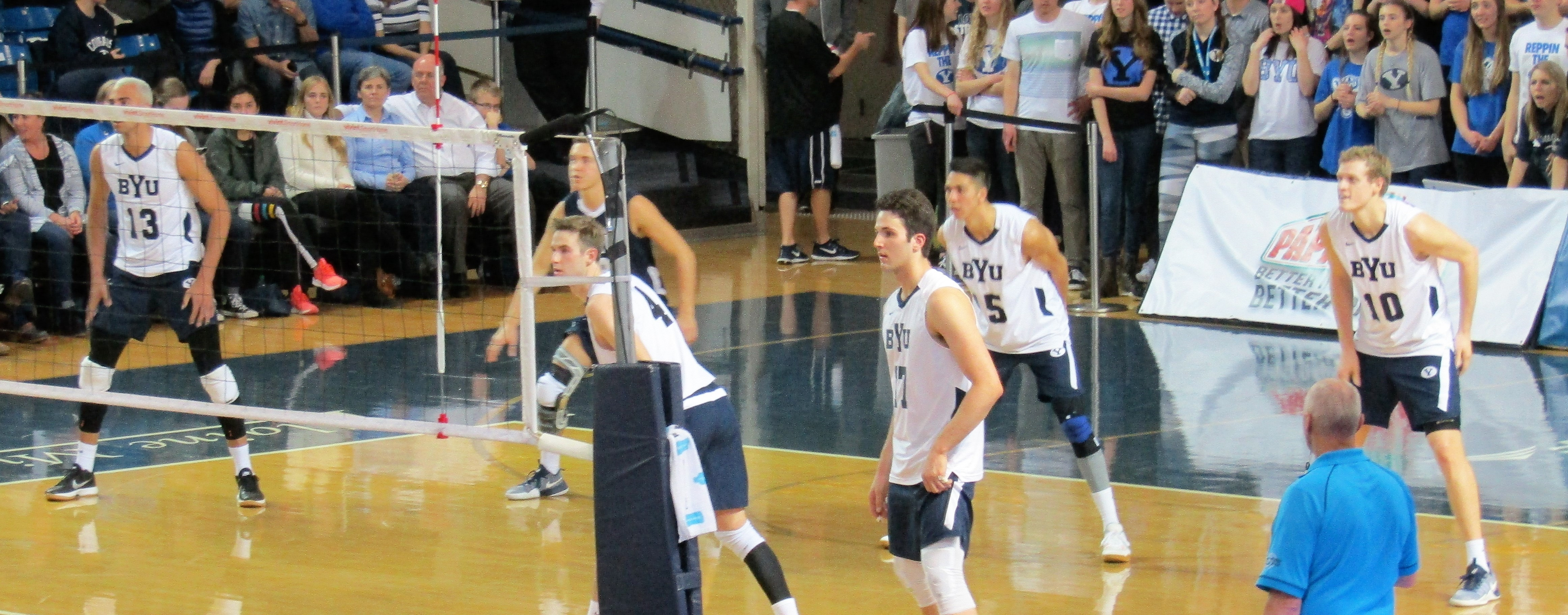
BYU playing at the Smith Fieldhouse in 2017

As of 2025, BYU men's volleyball has had 39 student-athletes receive a total of 84 All-America honors. Three team members have been awarded AVCA Player of the Year: Carlos Moreno (2004), Taylor Sander (2014), and Gabriel García Fernández (2020).

After college, many players have gone on to play on national and professional club teams, including 14 Olympians such as gold medalists Ryan Millar and Richard Lambourne (2008), and bronze medalist Taylor Sander (2016).

== Results by season ==
Record table
Season	Coach	Overall	Conference	Standing	Postseason
Carl McGown (Western Intercollegiate Volleyball Association) (1990–1992)
1990	Carl McGown	5–22	1–15	6th	—
1991	Carl McGown	2–25	1–15	6th	—
1992	Carl McGown	10–13	5–11	6th	—
Carl McGown:		17–60	7–41		
Carl McGown (Mountain Pacific Sports Federation) (1993–2002)
1993	Carl McGown	15–10	12–7	4th	—
1994	Carl McGown	21–6	15–4	2nd	—
1995	Carl McGown	14–8	12–7	3rd	—
1996	Carl McGown	8–14	7–12	5th	—
1997	Carl McGown	20–6	14–5	3rd	—
1998	Carl McGown	16–6	14–5	3rd	—
1999	Carl McGown	30–1	18–1	1st	NCAA Champions
2000	Carl McGown	18–9	13–6	3rd	—
2001	Carl McGown	23–4	14–3	1st	NCAA Champions
2002	Carl McGown	23–7	16–6	4th	—
Carl McGown:		205–131	142–97		
Tom Peterson (Mountain Pacific Sports Federation) (2003–2006)
2003	Tom Peterson	23–7	17–5	1st	NCAA Runner-up
2004	Tom Peterson	29–4	20–2	1st	NCAA Champions
2005	Tom Peterson	20–10	15–7	3rd	—
2006	Tom Peterson	18–9	14–8	4th	—
Tom Peterson:		90–30	66–22		
Shawn Patchell (Mountain Pacific Sports Federation) (2007–2010)
2007	Shawn Patchell	23–6	18–4	2nd	—
2008	Shawn Patchell	25–5	18–4	2nd	—
2009	Shawn Patchell	17–13	13–9	T-5th	—
2010	Shawn Patchell	22–9	15–7	2nd	—
Shawn Patchell:		87–33	64–24		
Rob Neilson (Mountain Pacific Sports Federation) (2011–2011)
2011	Rob Neilson	20–8	16–6	2nd	—
Rob Neilson:		20–8	16–6		
Chris McGown (Mountain Pacific Sports Federation) (2012–2015)
2012	Chris McGown	24–7	17–5	3rd	—
2013	Chris McGown	26–5	21–3	1st	NCAA Runner-up
2014	Chris McGown	21–9	18–6	1st	NCAA Final Four
2015	Chris McGown	17–10	14–8	5th	—
Chris McGown:		88–31	70–22		
Shawn Olmstead (Mountain Pacific Sports Federation) (2016–present)
2016	Shawn Olmstead	27–4	19–3	1st	NCAA Runner-up
2017	Shawn Olmstead	26–5	16–2	T-1st	NCAA Runner-up
2018	Shawn Olmstead	22–7	10–2	1st	NCAA Final Four
2019	Shawn Olmstead	13–12	6–6	T-4th	—
2020	Shawn Olmstead	17–1	6–0	1st	Cancelled (COVID)
2021	Shawn Olmstead	20–4	17–3	1st	NCAA Runner-up
2022	Shawn Olmstead	8–17	3–9	T-6th	—
2022	Shawn Olmstead	8–17	3–9	T-6th	—
2023	Shawn Olmstead	19–7	8–4	2nd	—
2024	Shawn Olmstead	16–9	7–5	3rd	—
2025	Shawn Olmstead	19–10	7–5	4th	—
2026	Shawn Olmstead	21–12	7–7	6th	—
Shawn Olmstead:		208–88	106–46		
Total:		698–321			
National champion Postseason invitational champion Conference regular season champion Conference regular season and conference tournament champion Division regular season champion Division regular season and conference tournament champion Conference tournament champion
