= 2020 BYU Cougars men's volleyball team =

American college volleyball season

2020 BYU Cougars men's volleyball
- Conference: Mountain Pacific Sports Federation
- Record: 17–1 (6–0 MPSF)
- Head coach: Shawn Olmstead (5th season)
- Assistant coaches: Devin Young (2nd season); Micah Naone (2nd season)
- Home arena: Smith Fieldhouse

The 2020 BYU Cougars men's volleyball team represented Brigham Young University in the 2020 NCAA Division I & II men's volleyball season. The Cougars, led by fifth year head coach Shawn Olmstead, played their home games at Smith Fieldhouse. The Cougars are members of the MPSF and were picked to win the MPSF in the preseason poll. On March 12 the NCAA, BYU, and the MPSF shutdown the remainder of the season due to COVID-19, leaving BYU to end the season ranked #1 and undefeated in conference play.

2020 Mountain Pacific Sports Federation men's volleyball standings
	Conf.				Overall
Team	W		L	PCT	W		L	PCT
No. 1 BYU ‍‍‍	6	–	0	1.000	17	–	1	.944
No. 11 Grand Canyon ‍‍‍	4	–	2	.667	14	–	7	.667
No. 8 Pepperdine ‍‍‍	3	–	2	.600	7	–	6	.538
No. 13 Concordia Irvine ‍‍‍	3	–	4	.429	11	–	10	.524
No. 9 UCLA ‍‍‍	2	–	3	.400	10	–	9	.526
No. 14 Stanford ‍‍‍	2	–	4	.333	6	–	11	.353
USC ‍‍‍	1	–	6	.143	5	–	14	.263
Rankings from AVCA

== Roster ==
2020 BYU Cougars roster
Defensive specialist/libero: 4 Jon Stanley - Freshman; 6 Zach Hendrickson - Junior; 12 Mitchel Worthington - Sophomore; Middle blockers: 10 Gavin Julien - Freshman; 16 Felipe de Brito Ferreira - Junior; 17 Branden Oberender - (redshirt) Sophomore; 18 Miki Jauhiainen - Senior; 21 Max Pothier - Freshman	Outside hitters: 1 Davide Gardini - Sophomore; 4 Jon Stanley - Freshman; 7 Cyrus Fa'alogo - Senior; 9 Andrew Lincoln - Sophomore; 11 Zach Eschenberg - Senior; 13 Kana'i Akana - Sophomore; 20 Teilon-Jonathan Tufuga - Freshman	Opposite hitters: 2 Alex Ah Sue - Sophomore; 5 Gabi Garcia Fernandez - Junior; Setters: 3 Wil Stanley - Senior; 23 Gavin Heap - Freshman; 24 Brody Earnest - Sophomore

== Schedule ==
TV/Internet Streaming information:

All home games will be televised on BYUtv. Most road games will also be streamed.

Date time	Opponent	Rank	Arena city (tournament)	Television	Score	Attendance	Record (MPSF record)
1/3; 6 p.m.	@ #11 Loyola-Chicago	#3	Joseph J. Gentile Arena; Chicago, IL	ESPN3	W 3–1 (25–22, 22–25, 25–22, 25–16)	496	1–0
1/4; 6 p.m.	@ #6 Lewis	#3	Neil Carey Arena; Romeoville, IL	GLVCSN	W 3–1 (25–21, 25–21, 22–25, 25–16)	995	2–0
1/10; 7 p.m.	#15 Penn State	#3	Smith Fieldhouse; Provo, UT	BYUtv	W 3–0 (25–23, 25–19, 25–22)	4,440	3–0
1/11; 5 p.m.	#15 Penn State	#3	Smith Fieldhouse; Provo, UT	BYUtv	W 3–0 (25–19, 25–22, 25–21)	3,080	4–0
1/17; 5 p.m.	@ Mount Olive	#2	Kornegay Arena; Mount Olive, NV	Conference Carolinas DN	W 3–0 (25–17, 25–10, 25–22)	228	5–0
1/18; 11 a.m.	@ Mount Olive	#2	Kornegay Arena; Mount Olive, NC	Conference Carolinas DN	W 3–0 (25–20, 25–23, 25–16)	384	6–0
1/22; 8 p.m.	@ #5 UC Irvine	#2	Bren Events Center; Irvine, CA	Big West TV	W 3–1 (25–17, 21–25, 25–20, 25–16)	637	7–0
1/24; 8 p.m.	@ #5 UC Irvine	#2	Bren Events Center; Irvine, CA	Big West TV	W 3–1 (28–30, 27–25, 25–17, 27–25)	1,665	8–0
1/31; 7 p.m.	#3 UCSB	#2	Smith Fieldhouse; Provo, UT	BYUtv	W 3–1 (25–16, 21–25, 25–21, 25–17)	4,692	9–0
2/1; 6 p.m.	#3 UCSB	#2	Smith Fieldhouse; Provo, UT	BYUtv	W 3–2 (23–25, 25–22, 20–25, 28–26, 15–11)	3,655	10–0
2/6; 7 p.m.	#7 UCLA*	#2	Smith Fieldhouse; Provo, UT	BYUtv	W 3–0 (31–29, 25–12, 25–23)	3,100	11–0 (1–0)
2/8; 5 p.m.	#8 Pepperdine*	#2	Smith Fieldhouse; Provo, UT	BYUtv	W 3–1 (25–18, 25–22, 22–25, 25–20)	3,775	12–0 (2–0)
2/14; 7 p.m.	Grand Canyon*	#2	GCU Arena; Phoenix, AZ	GCU TV	W 3–0 (25–22, 25–18, 28–26)	3,879	13–0 (3–0)
2/20; 7 p.m.	Concordia Irvine*	#2	Smith Fieldhouse; Provo, UT	BYUtv	W 3–0 (25–15, 25–19, 25–20)	2,762	14–0 (4–0)
2/22; 6 p.m.	USC*	#2	Smith Fieldhouse; Provo, UT	BYUtv	W 3–0 (25–18, 25–15, 25–19)	4,151	15–0 (5–0)
2/29; 7 p.m.	#13 Stanford*	#2	Smith Fieldhouse; Provo, UT	BYUtv	W 3–0 (25–12, 25–21, 25–22)	5,817	16–0 (6–0)
3/5; 10 p.m.	@ #1 Hawai'i	#2	Stan Sheriff Center; Honolulu, HI	SPEC HI; Big West TV	W 3–0 (25–15, 25–17, 25–20)	6,977	17–0
3/6; 10 p.m.	@ #1 Hawai'i	#2	Stan Sheriff Center; Honolulu, HI	SPEC HI; Big West TV	L 2–3 (25–20, 25–22, 22–25, 23–25, 17–19)	10,300	17–1
3/13; 8 p.m.	@ #14 Stanford*	#1	Maples Pavilion; Stanford, CA	P12+ STAN	Cancelled- COVID-19		
3/26; 8 p.m.	@ USC*		Galen Center; Los Angeles, CA	P12+ USC	Cancelled- COVID-19		
3/27; 2 p.m.	Concordia Irvine*		CU Arena; Irvine, CA	CIU on Stretch	Cancelled- COVID-19		
4/2; 7 p.m.	Grand Canyon*		Smith Fieldhouse; Provo, UT	BYUtv.org	Cancelled- COVID-19		
4/9; 8 p.m.	@ Pepperdine*		Firestone Fieldhouse; Malibu, CA	WCC Network	Cancelled- COVID-19		
4/11; 5 p.m.	@ UCLA*		Pauley Pavilion; Los Angeles, CA	P12+ UCLA	Cancelled- COVID-19		
TBA	TBA*		(MPSF Tournament)		Cancelled- COVID-19		

*-Indicates conference match.
Times listed are Mountain Time Zone.

== Announcers for televised games ==
- Loyola-Chicago: Jason Goch & Ray Gooden
- Lewis: No commentary
- Penn State: Jarom Jordan & Steve Vail
- Penn State: Jarom Jordan & Steve Vail
- Mount Olive: Aidan Gilbride & Ethan Swenson
- Mount Olive: Aidan Gilbride & Ethan Swenson
- UC Irvine: No commentary
- UC Irvine: No commentary
- UCSB: Jarom Jordan & Steve Vail
- UCSB: Jarom Jordan & Steve Vail
- UCLA: Jarom Jordan & Steve Vail
- Pepperdine: Jarom Jordan & Steve Vail
- Grand Canyon: Kyle Borg & Jack O'Hara
- Concordia Irvine: Jarom Jordan & Steve Vail
- USC: Jarom Jordan & Steve Vail
- Stanford: Jarom Jordan & Steve Vail
- Hawai'i: Kanoa Leahey, Chris McLachlin, & Ryan Kalei Tsuji
- Hawai'i: Kanoa Leahey, Chris McLachlin, & Ryan Kalei Tsuji
