= 2024 BYU Cougars men's volleyball team =

American college volleyball season

2024 BYU Cougars men's volleyball
- Conference: Mountain Pacific Sports Federation
- Record: 16–9 (7–5 MPSF)
- Head coach: Shawn Olmstead (9th season)
- Assistant coaches: Devin Young (6th season); Otavio Souza (2nd season)
- Home arena: Smith Fieldhouse

The 2024 BYU Cougars men's volleyball team represents Brigham Young University in the 2024 NCAA Division I & II men's volleyball season. The Cougars, led by ninth year head coach Shawn Olmstead, play their home games at Smith Fieldhouse. The Cougars are members of the MPSF. After finishing last season with a MPSF semifinal tournament loss, the Cougars were picked to finish tied for third with Grand Canyon in the MPSF Pre-Season Poll.

2024 Mountain Pacific Sports Federation men's volleyball standings
	Conf.				Overall
Team	W		L	PCT	W		L	PCT
No. 2 UCLA ‍†‍‍^{y}	11	–	1	.917	26	–	5	.839
No. 3 Grand Canyon ‍‍‡‍^{y}	10	–	2	.833	26	–	5	.839
No. 6 BYU ‍‍‍	7	–	5	.583	16	–	9	.640
No. 7 Stanford ‍‍‍	6	–	6	.500	14	–	12	.538
No. 9 Pepperdine ‍‍‍	5	–	7	.417	17	–	11	.607
No. 13 USC ‍‍‍	3	–	9	.250	13	–	15	.464
Concordia Irvine ‍‍‍	0	–	12	.000	6	–	19	.240
† – Conference champion ‡ – MPSF tournament champion y – Invited to the NCAA tournament Rankings from AVCA

== Season highlights ==
- Trent Brown won the MPSF Offensive Player of the Week award for Week 2 games.
- Tyler Hergert won the National Setter of the Week award for Week 2 games.

== Roster ==
2024 BYU Cougars roster
Defensive specialist/libero: 4 Jon Stanley - (redshirt) Senior; 6 Jackson Fife - Sophomore; 18 Bernardo Adam - Sophomore; Middle blockers: 5 Tyler Watts - Sophomore; 8 Caleb Sorenson - (redshirt) Freshman; 10 Gavin Julien - (redshirt) Senior; 19 Ethan Gant - Sophomore; 21 Teon Taylor - Junior	Outside hitters: 1 Luke Benson - Sophomore; 9 Trent Moser - Sophomore; 11 Jared Brady - Sophomore; 22 Jack Sutton - Sophomore; 23 Miks Ramanis - Junior; 24 Brigham Spilsbury - Sophomore	Opposite hitters: 13 Kupono Browne - Senior; 14 Ian Little - Sophomore; Setters: 2 Kyle Saurer - Freshman; 3 Tyler Hergert - Sophomore; 7 Noa Haine - Junior; 20 Cooper Jarman - Sophomore

== Schedule ==
TV/Internet Streaming information:

All home games will be televised on BYUtv or BYUtv.org. Most road games will also be streamed by the schools streaming service. The conference tournament will be streamed by FloVolleyball.

Date time	Opponent	Rank^{(tournament seed)}	Arena city (tournament)	Television	Score	Attendance	Record (MPSF record)
1/5; 7 p.m.	#15 Ball State	#9	Smith Fieldhouse; Provo, UT	BYUtv	W 3–0 (25–19, 25–21, 25–20)	3,242	1–0
1/6; 7 p.m.	#15 Ball State	#9	Smith Fieldhouse; Provo, UT	BYUtv	W 3–0 (25–19, 25–17, 25–16)	1,800	2–0
1/11; 6 p.m.	@ #10 Loyola Chicago	#9	Gentile Arena; Chicago, IL	NBCS CHIC+ ESPN+	W 3–2 (19–25, 26–24, 25–27, 25–22, 15–13)	489	3–0
1/13; 6 p.m.	@ #15 Lewis	#9	Neil Carey Arena; Romeoville, IL	Volleyball World on YouTube	L 2–3 (25–15, 25–19, 25–15)	4,125	3–1
1/19; 8 p.m.	@ #15 UC Santa Barbara	#9	Robertson Gymnasium; Santa Barbara, CA	ESPN+	W 3-1 (28–26, 19–25, 25–22, 25–20)	642	4–1
1/20; 7 p.m.	@ #15 UC Santa Barbara	#9	Robertson Gymnasium; Santa Barbara, CA	ESPN+	W 3–0 (25–23, 25–20, 27–25)	502	5–1
1/22; 7 p.m.	#14 Princeton	#8	Smith Fieldhouse; Provo, UT	BYUtv	W 3–0 (25–23, 25–19, 25–21)	2,735	6–1
1/23; 7 p.m.	#14 Princeton	#8	Smith Fieldhouse; Provo, UT	BYUtv	W 3–0 (25–22, 25–18, 25–23)	2,473	7–1
1/26; 7 p.m.	#7 UC Irvine	#8	Smith Fieldhouse; Provo, UT	BYUtv	'L 1–3 (25–22, 25–27, 18–25, 20–25)	3,662	7–2
1/27; 7 p.m.	#7 UC Irvine	#8	Smith Fieldhouse; Provo, UT	BYUtv	L 2–3 (25–23, 24–26, 18–25, 25–23, 13–15)	3,880	7–3
2/8; 7 p.m.	LIU	#8	Smith Fieldhouse; Provo, UT	BYUtv	W 3–0 (25–23, 25–22, 25–16)	2,911	8–3
2/10; 7 p.m.	LIU	#8	Smith Fieldhouse; Provo, UT	BYUtv	W 3–0 (25–18, 25–18, 25–21)	3,184	9–3
2/16; 7 p.m.	#2 Grand Canyon*	#6	Smith Fieldhouse; Provo, UT	BYUtv	L 0–3 (32–34, 23–25, 23–25)	3,944	9–4 (0–1)
2/17; 7 p.m.	#2 Grand Canyon*	#6	Smith Fieldhouse; Provo, UT	BYUtv	L 0–3 (21–25, 20–25, 23–25)	4,149	9–5 (0–2)
2/23; 7 p.m.	#4 UCLA*	#8	Smith Fieldhouse; Provo, UT	BYUtv	W 3–2 (31–29, 23–25, 18–25, 25–21, 15–12)	4,514	10–5 (1–2)
2/24; 7 p.m.	#4 UCLA*	#8	Smith Fieldhouse; Provo, UT	BYUtv	L 2–3 (21–25, 25–21, 25–19, 23–25, 10–15)	5,024	10–6 (1–3)
3/8; 8 p.m.	@ #7 Stanford*	#6	Maples Pavilion; Stanford, CA	P12 BAY	W 3–2 (25–13, 16–25, 23–25, 25–23, 18–16)	745	11–6 (2–3)
3/9; 7 p.m.	@ #7 Stanford*	#6	Maples Pavilion; Stanford, CA	P12 BAY	L 0–3 (19–25, 20–25, 21–25)	980	11–7 (2–4)
3/22; 7 p.m.	@ Pepperdine*		Firestone Fieldhouse; Malibu, CA	ESPN+	W 3-2 (24-26, 25-19, 25-22, 20-25, 15-12)	1273	12-7 (3-4)
3/23; 6 p.m.	@ Pepperdine*		Firestone Fieldhouse; Malibu, CA	ESPN+	W 3-2 (23-25, 25-17, 21-25, 25-19, 15-7)	1263	13-7 (4-4)
3/29; 7 p.m.	Concordia Irvine*		Smith Fieldhouse; Provo, UT	BYUtv	W 3-0 (25-21, 29-27, 25-21)	4450	14-7 (5-4)
3/30; 7 p.m.	Concordia Irvine*		Smith Fieldhouse; Provo, UT	BYUtv	W 3-0 (25-15, 25-16, 25-19)	4518	15-7 (6-4)
4/5; 7 p.m.	@ USC*		Galen Center; Los Angeles, CA	P12+ USC	W 3-1 (22-25, 25-21, 25-19, 25-13)	583	16-7 (7-4)
4/6; 7 p.m.	@ USC*		Galen Center; Los Angeles, CA	P12+ USC	L 2-3 (25-20, 25-17, 28-26, 27-29, 16-18)	1007	16-8 (7-5)
4/17; TBA	vs. USC		Galen Center; Los Angeles, CA (MPSF Quarterfinal)	FloVolleyball	L 2-3 (32-30, 27-29, 23-25, 25-18, 12-15)	618	16-9 (7-5)

*-Indicates conference match.
Times listed are Mountain Time Zone.

== Announcers for televised games ==
- Ball State: Spencer Linton, Steve Vail, & Kenzie Dahle
- Ball State: Spencer Linton, Steve Vail, & Kenzie Dahle
- Loyola Chicago: Scott Sudikoff & Ray Gooden
- Lewis: Rick Roquet & Rachel Kaczorowski
- UC Santa Barbara: Max Kelton & Katie Spieler
- UC Santa Barbara: Hunter Shumake & Katie Spieler
- Princeton: Jarom Jordan, Steve Vail, & Kenzie Dahle
- Princeton: Jarom Jordan, Steve Vail, & Kenzie Dahle
- UC Irvine: Jarom Jordan, Steve Vail, & Kenzie Dahle
- UC Irvine: Jarom Jordan, Steve Vail, & Kenzie Dahle
- LIU: Jarom Jordan, Steve Vail, & Kenzie Dahle
- LIU: Jarom Jordan, Steve Vail, & Kenzie Dahle
- Grand Canyon: Jarom Jordan, Steve Vail, & Kenzie Dahle
- Grand Canyon: Jarom Jordan, Steve Vail, & Kenzie Dahle
- UCLA: Jarom Jordan, Steve Vail, & Kenzie Dahle
- UCLA: Jarom Jordan, Steve Vail, & Kenzie Dahle
- Stanford: Ted Enberg
- Stanford: Troy Clardy
- Pepperdine: Al Epstein
- Pepperdine: Al Epstein
- Concordia Irvine: Jarom Jordan, Steve Vail, & Kenzie Dahle
- Concordia Irvine: Jarom Jordan, Steve Vail, & Kenzie Dahle
- USC:
- USC:
- MPSF Quarterfinal- :

== Rankings ==
Ranking movements Legend: ██ Increase in ranking ██ Decrease in ranking
	Week																	
Poll	Pre	1	2	3	4	5	6	7	8	9	10	11	12	13	14	15	16	Final
AVCA Coaches	9	9	9	8	8	8	6	8	6	6								
Off the Block Media	Not released		8	7	9	9	8	9	8	7								

^The Media does not release a Pre-season or Week 1 poll.
