= 2025 BYU Cougars men's volleyball team =

American college volleyball season

2025 BYU Cougars men's volleyball
- Conference: Mountain Pacific Sports Federation
- Record: 19–10 (7–5 MPSF)
- Head coach: Shawn Olmstead (10th season)
- Assistant coaches: Devin Young (7th season); Otavio Souza (3rd season)
- Home arena: Smith Fieldhouse

The 2025 BYU Cougars men's volleyball team represented Brigham Young University in the 2025 NCAA Division I & II men's volleyball season. The Cougars, led by tenth year head coach Shawn Olmstead, play their home games at Smith Fieldhouse. The Cougars are members of the MPSF. After finishing last season with a MPSF semifinal tournament loss, the Cougars were picked to finish third in the MPSF Pre-Season Poll.

2025 Mountain Pacific Sports Federation men's volleyball standings
	Conf.				Overall
Team	W		L	PCT	W		L	PCT
No. 2 UCLA ‍†‍‍^{y}	10	–	2	.833	22	–	7	.759
No. 6 USC ‍‍‍	8	–	4	.667	21	–	7	.750
No. 8 BYU ‍‍‍	7	–	5	.583	19	–	10	.655
No. 4 Pepperdine ‍‍‡‍^{y}	7	–	5	.583	21	–	10	.677
Menlo ‍‍‍	7	–	5	.583	13	–	13	.500
No. 11 Grand Canyon ‍‍‍	6	–	6	.500	8	–	10	.444
No. 12 Stanford ‍‍‍	4	–	8	.333	13	–	15	.464
Concordia Irvine ‍‍‍	3	–	9	.250	10	–	19	.345
Vanguard ‍‍‍	2	–	10	.167	8	–	18	.308
† – Conference champion ‡ – MPSF tournament champion y – Invited to the NCAA tournament Rankings from AVCA

== Season highlights ==
- Luke Benson won the MPSF Offensive Player of the Week for games held Opening Week. Likewise Teon Taylor won the MPSF Defensive Player of the Week Opening Week.

== Roster ==
2025 BYU Cougars roster
Defensive specialist/libero: 6 Jackson Fife - Junior; 15 Bernardo Adam - Junior; Middle blockers: 5 Niko Hales - Freshman; 17 Gavin Chambers - Freshman; 19 Ethan Gant - Junior; 21 Teon Taylor - Senior	Outside hitters: 1 Luke Benson - Senior; 9 Teilon-Jonathan Tufuga - Sophomore; 10 Lucas Torres - Junior; 11 Jared Brady - Junior; 20 Keoni Thiim - Senior; 22 Jack Sutton - Junior; 23 Miks Ramanis - Senior; 24 Cole Hauser - Junior	Opposite hitters: 10 Lucas Torres - Junior; 14 Ian Little - (redshirt) Sophomore; Setters: 2 Kyle Saurer - (redshirt) Freshman; 3 Tyler Hergert - Junior

== Schedule ==
TV/Internet Streaming information:

All home games will be televised on BYUtv, BYUtv.org, and BTN+/B1G+. 8 home matches will be live on BTN+ and shown tape delayed on BYUtv while the other 8 will be live on both platforms. Most road games will also be streamed by the schools streaming service. The conference tournament will be streamed by BTN+/B1G+.

Date time	Opponent	Rank^{(tournament seed)}	Arena city (tournament)	Television	Score	Attendance	Record (MPSF record)
1/3; 5 p.m.	@ #11 Ohio State	#6	Covelli Center; Columbus, OH	BTN+	W 3–1 (19–25, 25–20, 25–20, 25–18)	1,292	1–0
1/4; 5 p.m.	@ #11 Ohio State	#6	Covelli Center; Columbus, OH	BTN+	W 3–1 (29–27, 23–25, 25–15, 25–17)	1,116	2–0
1/10; 7 p.m.	St. Thomas Aquinas	#6	Smith Fieldhouse; Provo, UT	byutv.org BTN+	W 3–0 (25–11, 25–14, 25–21)	3,453	3–0
1/11; 7 p.m.	St. Thomas Aquinas	#6	Smith Fieldhouse; Provo, UT	BTN+ BYUtv (TD)	W 3–0 (25–15, 25–16, 25–16)	3,609	4–0
1/16; 5 p.m.	@ #6 Ball State	#5	Worthen Arena; Muncie, IN	ESPN+	W 3–2 (23–25, 25–27, 25–15, 25–19, 15–12)	2,018	5–0
1/17; 5 p.m.	@ #6 Ball State	#5	Worthen Arena; Muncie, IN	ESPN+	W 3–2 (22–25, 26–24, 22–25, 25–17, 15–9)	2,040	6–0
1/22; 7 p.m.	@ #2 UC Irvine	#5	Bren Events Center; Irvine, CA	ESPN+	L 3-2 (17-25, 25-21, 23-25, 26-24, 12-15)	1,518	6-1
1/24; 7 p.m.	@ #2 UC Irvine	#5	Bren Events Center; Irvine, CA	ESPN+	L 0-3 (21-25, 12-25, 19-25)	2,823	6-2
1/31; 7 p.m.	#4 Hawai'i	#5	Smith Fieldhouse; Provo, UT	BYUtv; BTN+	L 2-3 (25-20, 22-25, 25-23, 16-25, 20-22)	5,019	6-3
2/1; 7 p.m.	#4 Hawai'i	#5	Smith Fieldhouse; Provo, UT	BYUtv; BTN+	L 1-3 (18-25, 22-25, 25-22, 22-25)	5,387	6-4
2/7; 7 p.m.	#15 UC Santa Barbara	#6	Smith Fieldhouse; Provo, UT	BTN+ BYUtv (TD)	W 3-0 (25-11, 25-22, 25-18)	3,705	7-4
2/8; 7 p.m.	#15 UC Santa Barbara	#6	Smith Fieldhouse; Provo, UT	BTN+ BYUtv (TD)	W 3-0 (25-20, 25-21, 25-22)	3,907	8-4
2/14; 8 p.m.	@ Concordia Irvine*	#7	CU Arena; Irvine, CA	BTN+	W 3-1 (25-16, 25-23, 17-25, 25-17)	221	9-4 (1-0)
2/15; 8 p.m.	@ Concordia Irvine*	#7	CU Arena; Irvine, CA	BTN+	W 3-2 (25-21, 25-15, 18-25, 20-25, 15-8)	348	10-4 (2-0)
2/21; 7 p.m.	Barry	#7	Smith Fieldhouse; Provo, UT	BTN+ BYUtv (TD)	W 3-1 (25-14, 25-15, 19-25, 25-13)	3,529	11-4 (2-0)
2/22; 7 p.m.	Barry	#7	Smith Fieldhouse; Provo, UT	BTN+ BYUtv (TD)	W 3-0 (25-12, 25-16, 26-24)	3,914	12-4 (2-0)
3/7; 7 p.m.	#5 USC*	#6	Smith Fieldhouse; Provo, UT	BYUtv; BTN+	'L 2–3 (25–23, 21–25, 23–25, 25–21, 21–23)	4,606	12–5 (2–1)
3/8; 7 p.m.	#5 USC*	#6	Smith Fieldhouse; Provo, UT	BTN+ BYUtv (TD)	L 0–3 (25–27, 24–26, 20–25)	3,613	12–6 (2–2)
3/15; 7 p.m.	Harvard	#6	Smith Fieldhouse; Provo, UT	BTN+ BYUtv (TD)	W 3–0 (25–21, 25–18, 25–15)	4,869	13–6
3/17; 7 p.m.	Harvard	#6	Smith Fieldhouse; Provo, UT	BTN+ BYUtv (TD)	W 3–1 (21–25, 25–14, 25–20, 25–21)	3,029	14–6
3/21; 7 p.m.	@ #14 Grand Canyon*	#6	Global Credit Union Arena; Phoenix, AZ	BTN+	W 3–1 (25–18, 25–18, 22–25, 25–23)	1,647	15–6 (3–2)
3/22; 7 p.m.	@ #14 Grand Canyon*	#6	Global Credit Union Arena; Phoenix, AZ	BTN+	L 0–3 (16–25, 17–25, 19–25)	1,527	15–7 (3–3)
4/3; 7 p.m.	#12 Stanford*	#7	Smith Fieldhouse; Provo, UT	BYUtv; BTN+	W 3–0 (25–15, 25–19, 25–23)	3,696	16–7 (4–3)
4/4; 7 p.m.	#12 Stanford*	#7	Smith Fieldhouse; Provo, UT	BYUtv; BTN+	W 3–1 (25–23, 20–25, 25–23, 25–17)	4,436	17–7 (5–3)
4/11; 8 p.m.	@ #2 UCLA*	#7	Pauley Pavilion; Los Angeles, CA	BTN+	L 2–3 (25–22, 15–25, 21–25, 27–25, 17–19)	1,066	17–8 (5–4)
4/12; 6 p.m.	@ #2 UCLA*	#7	Pauley Pavilion; Los Angeles, CA	BTN	L 1–3 (17–25, 25–22, 21–25, 17–25)	2,018	17–9 (5–5)
4/18; 7 p.m.	#7 Pepperdine*	#8	Smith Fieldhouse; Provo, UT	BYUtv; BTN+	W 3–2 (25–21, 26–28, 25–17, 17–25, 15–12)	3,530	18–9 (6–5)
4/19; 7 p.m.	#7 Pepperdine*	#8	Smith Fieldhouse; Provo, UT	BYUtv; BTN+	W 3–1 (25–19, 25–20, 23–25, 25–17)	3,596	19–9 (7–5)
4/24; 9 p.m.	#12 Stanford	#8	Firestone Fieldhouse; Malibu, CA (MPSF Tournament)	BTN+	L 2–3 (23–25, 25–19, 25–27, 25–19, 10–15)	305	19–10

*-Indicates conference match.
Times listed are Mountain Time Zone.

== Announcers for televised games ==
- Ohio State: Jonathan Matthes & Dylan Tyrer
- Ohio State: Sara Sharp & Hanna Williford
- St. Thomas Aquinas: Jarom Jordan, Steve Vail, & Kenzie Dahle
- St. Thomas Aquinas: Jarom Jordan, Steve Vail, & Kenzie Dahle
- Ball State: Jordan Klimes, Dominick Liacone, & Brayden Carroll
- Ball State: Dominick Liacone, Jordan Klimes, & Brayden Carroll
- UC Irvine: Rob Espero & Charlie Brande
- UC Irvine: Rob Espero & Charlie Brande
- Hawai'i: Jarom Jordan, Steve Vail, & Kenzie Dahle
- Hawai'i: Jarom Jordan, Steve Vail, & Kenzie Dahle
- UC Santa Barbara: Jarom Jordan, Steve Vail, & Kenzie Dahle
- UC Santa Barbara: Jarom Jordan, Steve Vail, & Kenzie Dahle
- Concordia Irvine: Charlie Dalton
- Concordia Irvine: Charlie Dalton & Tavin Carncross
- Barry: Jarom Jordan & Kenzie Dahle
- Barry: Jarom Jordan & Kenzie Dahle
- USC: Jarom Jordan & Kenzie Dahle
- USC: Jarom Jordan & Kenzie Dahle
- Harvard: Jarom Jordan & Kenzie Dahle
- Harvard: Jarom Jordan & Andrew Stewart
- Grand Canyon: Tyler Hartman & Annabella Howerton
- Grand Canyon: Tyler Hartman & Annabella Howerton
- Stanford: Jarom Jordan & Kenzie Dahle
- Stanford: Jarom Jordan, Jon Alleman, & Joe Hillman
- UCLA: Darren Preston & Victoria Dennis
- UCLA: Kevin Barnett & Camryn Irwin
- Pepperdine: Jason Shepherd & Kenzie Dahle
- Pepperdine: Jarom Jordan & Kenzie Dahle
- MPSF Tournament- Stanford: Al Epstein & Joey Vergilis

== Rankings ==
Ranking movements Legend: ██ Increase in ranking ██ Decrease in ranking
	Week																	
Poll	Pre	1	2	3	4	5	6	7	8	9	10	11	12	13	14	15	16	Final
AVCA Coaches	6	5	5	5	6	6	6	6	6	6	6	7	7	7	8	7	8	8
Off the Block Media	Not released		4	5	5	5	5	7	7	6	6	7	6	9	7	8	9	8

^The Media does not release a Pre-season or Week 1 poll.
