= 2016 BYU Cougars men's volleyball team =

Sports team

2016 BYU Cougars men's volleyball

2016 AVCA Showcase Champions 2016 MPSF Regular Season Champions 2016 MPSF Tournament Champions

NCAA Tournament 1–seed, L, Final 3–0
- Conference: Mountain Pacific Sports Federation
- Record: 27–3 (19–3 MPSF)
- Head coach: Shawn Olmstead (1st season)
- Assistant coaches: Luka Slabe (1st season); Jaylen Reyes (1st season)
- Home arena: Smith Fieldhouse

2016 Mountain Pacific Sports Federation men's volleyball standings
	Conf.				Overall
Team	W		L	PCT	W		L	PCT
No. 2 BYU ‍†‍‍^{y}	19	–	3	.864	27	–	4	.871
No. 3 UCLA ‍‍‍^{y}	17	–	5	.773	25	–	7	.781
No. 4 Long Beach State ‍‍‍^{y}	17	–	5	.773	25	–	8	.758
No. 6 Stanford ‍‍‍	17	–	5	.773	19	–	6	.760
No. 5 UCSB ‍‍‍	14	–	8	.636	20	–	10	.667
No. 7 Pepperdine ‍‍‍	12	–	10	.545	13	–	11	.542
No. 8 Hawaiʻi ‍‍‍	11	–	11	.500	16	–	12	.571
UC Irvine ‍‍‍	7	–	15	.318	10	–	20	.333
No. 14 CSUN ‍‍‍	7	–	15	.318	14	–	15	.483
Cal Baptist ‍‍‍	6	–	16	.273	14	–	16	.467
USC ‍‍‍	5	–	17	.227	7	–	19	.269
UC San Diego ‍‍‍	0	–	22	.000	5	–	23	.179
† – Conference champion y – Invited to the NCAA tournament Rankings from AVCA

The 2016 BYU Cougars men's volleyball team represented Brigham Young University in the 2016 NCAA Division I & II men's volleyball season. The Cougars, led by first year head coach Shawn Olmstead, play their home games at Smith Fieldhouse. The Cougars were members of the MPSF and were picked to win the MPSF in the preseason poll.

== Season highlights ==
- BYU set a new school record for most sets won consecutive in the rally era. The streak ended at 35 straight sets.

== Roster ==
2016 BYU Cougars roster
Defensive specialist/libero: 3 Evan Chang - Senior; 8 Erik Sikes - Sophomore; Middle blockers: 1 Price Jarman - Sophomore; 17 Joseph Grosh - Junior; 21 Christian Rupert - RS Freshman; 23 Michael Hatch - Senior	Outside hitters: 5 Kiril Meretev - Junior; 10 Jake Langolis - Junior; 14 Tyler Hutchins - Senior; 15 Brenden Sander - Sophomore; 20 Tanner Skabelund - Freshman	Opposite hitters: 2 Carson Heninger - Senior; 11 Matt Underwood - Senior; 13 Ben Patch - Sophomore; 16 Tim Dobbert - RS Sophomore; Setters: 4 Leo Durkin - Sophomore; 18 Robbie Sutton - Senior; 24 Andrew Lincoln - Freshman

== Schedule ==
Radio information:

BYU Radio simulcasted all BYUtv games with the BYUtv feed except March 18 against Pepperdine. March 18 against Pepperdine was pulled from BYU Radio so they could broadcast the BYU men's basketball NIT game instead.
KBEACH broadcast both BYU @ Long Beach State matches live. The radio call will be simulcast on LBSU TV.
KKEA broadcast both BYU at Hawaiʻi matches live.
Bruin TV broadcast a radio stream of both BYU at UCLA matches.
BYU Radio carried the NCAA Semifinal and Final.

Date time	Opponent	Rank	Arena city (tournament)	Television	Score	Attendance	Record (MPSF record)
1/8; 7 p.m.	#3 Loyola-Chicago	#1	Smith Fieldhouse; Provo, UT (AVCA Showcase)	BYUtv	W 3–1 (25–19, 23–25, 25–19, 25–19)	5,637	1–0
1/9; 7 p.m.	#14 George Mason	#1	Smith Fieldhouse; Provo, UT (AVCA Showcase)	TheW.tv	W 3–1 (25–17, 25–17, 29–31, 25–12)	2,727	2–0
1/15; 7 p.m.	#11 Stanford*	#1	Smith Fieldhouse; Provo,UT	BYUtv	L 3–2 (25–18, 19–25, 23–25, 25–23, 15–11)	5,059	2–1 (0–1)
1/16; 7 p.m.	#11 Stanford*	#1	Smith Fieldhouse; Provo, UT	BYUtv	W 3–2 (16–25, 25–23, 25–21, 22–25, 15–10)	4,830	3–1 (1–1)
1/22; 8 p.m.	@ #2 Long Beach State*	#3	Walter Pyramid; Long Beach, CA	BigWest.tv	W 3–1 (26–24, 25–17, 16–25, 25–21)	2,027	4–1 (2–1)
1/23; 8 p.m.	@ #2 Long Beach State*	#3	Walter Pyramid; Long Beach, CA	BigWest.tv	L 3–0 (25–16, 25–23, 25–18)	1,883	4–2 (2–2)
1/29; 8 p.m.	@ #9 UC Irvine*	#3	Bren Events Center; Irvine, CA	YouTube	W 3–0 (25–20, 25–23, 25–20)	1,649	5–2 (3–2)
1/30; 3 p.m.	@ #9 UC Irvine*	#3	Bren Events Center; Irvine, CA	YouTube	W 3–0 (26–24, 28–26, 25–15)	1,156	6–2 (4–2)
2/5; 7 p.m.	#10 UC Santa Barbara*	#3	Smith Fieldhouse; Provo, UT	BYUtv	W 3–0 (25–20, 25–16, 26–24)	4,063	7–2 (5–2)
2/6; 7 p.m.	#10 UC Santa Barbara*	#3	Smith Fieldhouse; Provo, UT	BYUtv	W 3–0 (25–17, 25–23, 25–14)	3,813	8–2 (6–2)
2/12; 5 p.m.	@ Princeton	#3	Dillon Gymnasium; Princeton, NJ	Ivy League DN	W 3–0 (25–22, 25–19, 25–22)	1,154	9–2
2/13; 5:30 p.m.	@ NJIT	#3	Fleisher Center; Newark, NJ	ESPN3	W 3–0 (25–22, 25–19, 25–19)	500	10–2
2/19; 8 p.m.	@ #15 Cal Baptist*	#2	Van Dyne Gymnasium; Riverside, CA	CBU TV	W 3–0 (25–19, 25–20, 25–22)	627	11–2 (7–2)
2/20; 8 p.m.	@ #15 Cal Baptist*	#2	Van Dyne Gymnasium; Riverside, CA	CBU TV	W 3–0 (25–20, 25–18, 25–19)	722	12–2 (8–2)
2/26; 7 p.m.	#12 CSUN*	#2	Smith Fieldhouse; Provo, UT	BYUtv	W 3–0 (25–21, 25–18, 25–15)	3,519	13–2 (9–2)
2/27; 8 p.m.	#12 CSUN*	#2	Smith Fieldhouse; Provo, UT	BYUtv	W 3–0 (25–16, 25–16, 25–19)	3,445	14–2 (10–2)
3/2; 10 p.m.	@ #7 Hawaiʻi*	#2	Stan Sheriff Center; Honolulu, HI	Oc 16	W 3–0 (25–20, 25–20, 25–23)	3,038	15–2 (11–2)
3/4; 10 p.m.	@ #7 Hawaiʻi*	#2	Stan Sheriff Center; Honolulu, HI	Oc 16	W 3–1 (25–22, 25–22, 23–25, 25–22)	4,838	16–2 (12–2)
3/18; 7 p.m.	#8 Pepperdine*	#1	Smith Fieldhouse; Provo, UT	BYUtv	W 3–0 (28–26, 25–19, 25–20)	3,325	17–2 (13–2)
3/19; 7 p.m.	#8 Pepperdine*	#1	Smith Fieldhouse; Provo, UT	BYUtv	L 3–1 (23–25, 33–31, 25–23, 25–22)	3,567	17–3 (13–3)
3/25; 8 p.m.	@ UC San Diego*	#3	RIMAC Arena; La Jolla, CA	Triton Zone	W 3–0 (25–18, 26–24, 25–21)	888	18–3 (14–3)
3/26; 8 p.m.	@ UC San Diego*	#3	RIMAC Arena; La Jolla, CA	Triton Zone	W 3–0 (25–19, 25–13, 25–21)	624	19–3 (15–3)
4/1; 9 p.m.	@ #1 UCLA*	#3	Pauley Pavilion; Los Angeles, CA	P12 LA	W 3–1 (25–17, 19–25, 27–25, 25–13)	1,838	20–3 (16–3)
4/2; 8 p.m.	@ #1 UCLA*	#3	Pauley Pavilion; Los Angeles, CA	P12 UCLA	W 3–1 (20–25, 25–20, 25–18, 25–23)	1,829	21–3 (17–3)
4/8; 7 p.m.	USC*	#1	Smith Fieldhouse; Provo, UT	BYUtv	W 3–0 (25–15, 25–13, 25–15)	4,137	22–3 (18–3)
4/9; 7 p.m.	USC*	#1	Smith Fieldhouse; Provo, UT	BYUtv	W 3–0 (25–16, 25–12, 25–17)	4,011	23–3 (19–3)
4/16; 7 p.m.	x-#14 UC Irvine	#1	Smith Fieldhouse; Provo, UT (MPSF Quarterfinal)	BYUtv	W 3–0 (25–21, 25–20, 25–23)	3,535	24–3
4/21; 7:30 p.m.	x-#6 UC Santa Barbara	#1	Smith Fieldhouse; Provo, UT (MPSF Semifinal)	BYUtv	W 3–2 (25–18, 25–22, 23–25, 24–26, 15–12)	3,151	25–3
4/23; 7 p.m.	x-#3 UCLA	#1	Smith Fieldhouse; Provo, UT (MPSF Championship)	BYUtv	W 3–1 (25–20, 25–19, 18–25, 25–15)	4,875	26–3
5/5; 4 p.m.	y-vs. #4 Long Beach State	#1	Rec Hall; University Park, PA (NCAA Semifinal)	NCAA.com	W 3–1 (25–21, 23–25, 25–19, 25–18)	N/A	27–3
5/7; 6 p.m.	y-vs.#2 Ohio State	#1	Rec Hall; University Park, PA (NCAA Final)	ESPN2	L 3–0 (32–30, 25–23, 25–17)	2,745	27–4

*-Indicates conference match.
x-Indicates MPSF Tournament.
y-Indicates NCAA Playoffs
Times listed are Mountain Time Zone.

== Announcers for televised games ==
- Loyola-Chicago: Jarom Jordan, Steve Vail, & Lauren Francom
- George Mason: Jason Shepherd & David Hyte
- Stanford: Jarom Jordan, Steve Vail, & Lauren Francom
- Stanford: Jarom Jordan, Steve Vail, & Lauren Francom
- Long Beach State: Jacob Fisk
- Long Beach State: Jacob Fisk
- UC Irvine: No commentators (video only)
- UC Irvine: No commentators (video only)
- UC Santa Barbara: Jarom Jordan, Steve Vail, & Lauren Francom
- UC Santa Barbara: Jarom Jordan, Steve Vail, & Lauren Francom
- Princeton: Brittany Smith & Mary Claire Bartlett
- Cal Baptist: Chris Velasquez
- Cal Baptist: Chris Velasquez
- Cal State Northridge: Jarom Jordan, Steve Vail, & Lauren Francom
- Cal State Northridge: Jarom Jordan, Steve Vail, & Lauren Francom
- Hawai'i: Kanoa Leahey & Chris McLachlin
- Hawai'i: Kanoa Leahey & Chris McLachlin
- Pepperdine: Jarom Jordan, Steve Vail, & Lauren Francom
- Pepperdine: Jarom Jordan, Steve Vail, & Lauren Francom
- UC San Diego: Tim Strombel & Ricci Luyties
- UC San Diego: Tim Strombel & Ricci Luyties
- UCLA: Anne Marie Anderson & Al Scates
- UCLA: Denny Cline & Peter Ashley
- USC: Jarom Jordan, Steve Vail, & Lauren Francom
- USC: Jarom Jordan, Steve Vail, & Lauren Francom
- UC Irvine: Jarom Jordan, Steve Vail, & Lauren Francom
- UC Santa Barbara: Jarom Jordan, Steve Vail, & Lauren Francom
- UCLA: Jarom Jordan, Steve Vail, & Lauren Francom
- Long Beach State: Ralph Bednarczyk
- Ohio State: Paul Sunderland & Kevin Barnett
