= 2017 NCAA men's volleyball tournament =

2017 NCAA National Collegiate men's volleyball tournament

Tournament details
- Dates: May 2–6, 2017
- Teams: 6

Final positions
- Champions: Ohio State (3rd title)
- Runners-up: BYU

Tournament statistics
- Matches played: 5

Awards
- Most Outstanding Player: Nicolas Szerszeń ^{(Ohio State)}

The 2017 NCAA National Collegiate Volleyball Tournament was the 48th edition of the NCAA Men's National Collegiate Volleyball Championship, open to teams from both Division I and II. The tournament was held May 2, 4, & 6 at St. John Arena in Columbus, Ohio, hosted by Ohio State University. The Ohio State Buckeyes won their second consecutive National Championship and third overall.

== Qualification ==
The champions of Conference Carolinas, the Eastern Intercollegiate Volleyball Association, Midwestern Intercollegiate Volleyball Association, and Mountain Pacific Sports Federation received automatic bids to the tournament, while two other teams were selected at large.

- Automatic bids
  - Barton: Conference Carolinas
  - Penn State: Eastern Intercollegiate Volleyball Association
  - Ohio State: Midwestern Intercollegiate Volleyball Association
  - Long Beach State: Mountain Pacific Sports Federation
- At large bids
  - BYU: Mountain Pacific Sports Federation
  - Hawai'i: Mountain Pacific Sports Federation

== Tournament bracket ==
Quarterfinals; Tuesday, May 2
4	Hawaii	23	27	17	25	15
5	Penn State	25	25	25	14	4
3	BYU	25	25	25
6	Barton	19	11	15

Semifinals; Thursday, May 4
1	Ohio State	25	25	25
4	Hawaii	23	18	19
2	Long Beach State	20	18	23
3	BYU	25	25	25

Championship; Saturday, May 6
1	Ohio State	25	25	25
3	BYU	19	20	22

== All-Tournament Team ==
- Christy Blough – Ohio State
- Driss Guessous – Ohio State
- Maxime Hervoir – Ohio State
- Blake Leeson – Ohio State
- Brenden Sander – BYU
- Nicolas Szerszeń – Ohio State (Most Outstanding Player)
- Stjin van Tilburg – Hawaii

== Broadcasts ==
TWCS Hawaii carried the Hawaii first round match. The semifinals were streamed on NCAA.com and the championship match was broadcast on ESPN2.

- Hawaii/Penn State: Kanoa Leahey & Chris McLachlin
- Semifinals: Ralph Bednarcyzk
- Championship: Paul Sunderland & Kevin Barnett
