= Mountain Pacific Sports Federation =

American collegiate athletic conference

- Association: NCAA
- Founded: 1992; 34 years ago
- Commissioner: Foti Mellis (since 2021)
- Sports fielded: 18; men's: 7; women's: 10; coeducational: 1
- Division: Division I Division II (Men's Wrestling)
- No. of teams: 70
- Headquarters: Seattle, Washington
- Region: Western United States, Southwestern United States, Southern United States, Northwestern United States, British Columbia
- Website: mpsports.org

Locations

The Mountain Pacific Sports Federation (MPSF) is a college athletic conference with members located mostly in the Western United States, although it has added members as far east as Massachusetts. The conference participates at the NCAA Division I level, primarily in Olympic sports that are not sponsored by a school's primary conference (such as the Pac-12 and Big West, many of whose members participate in MPSF competition in at least one of its sports).

== History ==
The MPSF was founded in 1992 to provide an outlet for competition in non-revenue-producing Olympic sports. The MPSF conducts championships in men's volleyball, as well as indoor track, gymnastics, and water polo for both men and women. In 2010 the MPSF added women's swimming and diving, and added those sports for men in the 2011–12 season. The 2012–13 school year was the last for MPSF competition in men's soccer, and the 2020–21 school year was the last for MPSF women's lacrosse.

The conference membership varies by sport; 64 schools are MPSF members in at least one of its sponsored sports. Schools are not required to participate in MPSF competition for a sponsored sport if their primary conference sponsors a competition in that sport (e.g. Pac-12 in soccer and women's gymnastics before the conference's 2024 collapse).

All MPSF members have a primary conference affiliation. As of the current 2026–27 season, MPSF representation by primary conference is as follows:

- 12 members – Big West Conference (Cal Baptist, Cal Poly, Cal State Bakersfield, Cal State Fullerton, Cal State Northridge, Long Beach State, Sacramento State, UC Irvine, UC Riverside, UC San Diego, UC Santa Barbara, Utah Valley – every full member)
- 9 members – West Coast Conference (Denver, Loyola Marymount, Pacific, Pepperdine, Portland, Saint Mary's, San Diego, San Francisco, Seattle – every full member except Santa Clara)
- 8 members – Pac-12 Conference (Boise State, Colorado State, Fresno State, Oregon State, San Diego State, Texas State, Utah State, Washington State – every full member except Gonzaga)
- 5 members – Big Ten Conference (Indiana, Oregon, UCLA, USC, Washington)
- 4 members
  - Big Sky Conference (Idaho, Northern Arizona, Northern Colorado, Utah Tech)
  - Mountain West Conference (Air Force, Grand Canyon, San Jose State, UC Davis)
  - Pacific West Conference (Concordia–Irvine, Jessup, Menlo, Vanguard)
- 3 members
  - California Collegiate Athletic Association (Cal Poly Humboldt, San Francisco State, UC Merced)
  - Southeastern Conference (LSU, Oklahoma, Texas)
- 2 members
  - Atlantic Coast Conference (California, Stanford)
  - Big 12 Conference (Arizona State, BYU)
  - Conference USA (Delaware, New Mexico State)
  - Southland Conference (Incarnate Word, UTRGV)
- 1 member
  - Allegheny Mountain Collegiate Conference (Penn State Behrend)
  - Atlantic Sun Conference (Queens (NC))
  - Canada West Universities Athletic Association, part of that country's governing body of U Sports (UBC)
  - Centennial Conference (Johns Hopkins)
  - College Conference of Illinois and Wisconsin (Augustana (IL))
  - Great Northwest Athletic Conference (Alaska Anchorage)
  - Lone Star Conference (Texas Woman's)
  - New England Small College Athletic Conference (Connecticut College)
  - New England Women's and Men's Athletic Conference (Wheaton (MA))
  - Presidents' Athletic Conference (Washington & Jefferson)
  - Southern Collegiate Athletic Conference (Austin)

Due to the Big West addition of men's and women's swimming and diving as a sponsored sport beginning in the 2024–25 school year, six Big West members moved their aquatics programs to their primary conference, including three members (Bakersfield, Cal Poly, and UC Santa Barbara) for whom aquatics comprised their only MPSF teams and thus effectively left the MPSF.

The MPSF added four sports in 2024–25—the non-NCAA sport of men's rowing; the fully recognized NCAA sports of women's beach volleyball and men's wrestling; and women's wrestling, then an emerging NCAA sport and since 2025–26 a fully recognized NCAA sport. The men's rowing league consists entirely of Division I members (California, Gonzaga, Oregon State, San Diego, Santa Clara, Stanford, UC San Diego, and Washington). By contrast, the wrestling leagues include only Division II members: Cal Poly Humboldt (men), Menlo (both), San Francisco State (men), and Vanguard (both).

The addition of swimming & diving by the Big West left the MPSF with only two men's and four women's teams in that sport. The MPSF started a rebuilding process in that sport by announcing on February 13, 2025, that it would add seven members for swimming & diving effective in 2025–26. At the time of announcement, all were housing swimming & diving in the Western Athletic Conference, which is rumored to be dropping the sport after the 2024–25 season. Six of the new members sponsor only the women's sport—Idaho, New Mexico State, Northern Arizona, Northern Colorado (returning to MPSF women's swimming & diving after a 13-year absence), Utah Tech, and UTRGV. The other new member, California Baptist, sponsors the sport for both sexes. However, California Baptist will only compete in the MPSF in the 2025–26 season, as it will become a full Big West member in July 2026. The men's volleyball league lost Grand Canyon after the spring 2025 season; the school downgraded the sport from varsity to club status. The MPSF added women's field hockey as a sponsored sport in 2025–26 with Delaware and UC Davis as members.

In 2025, the MPSF added its first member outside of the NCAA, as well as its first international member, when the University of British Columbia announced it would join the MPSF. UBC primarily plays as a member of U Sports, the Canadian governing body for college athletics, with a select few of its sports not sponsored by U Sports instead affiliated with the NAIA. While Canadian universities are currently not allowed to apply for membership within NCAA Division I as of 2025, UBC announced it would join the MPSF for the sport of men's rowing, which is not sponsored by the NCAA.

The most recently added sport is stunt, an all-female cheerleading discipline that emphasizes acrobatics. The MPSF added the sport with four members in 2026–27, coinciding with the first season of official NCAA competition (the sport had previously been part of the NCAA Emerging Sports for Women program).

Al Beaird was the first executive director of the MPSF for 24 years, from 1998 to 2021. Foti Mellis became the second executive director on June 1, 2021. Mellis was a Senior Associate Athletic Director at the University of California.

== Members ==
=== Existing members ===
Institution	Location	Nickname	Primary conference	Affiliation
United States Air Force Academy (Air Force)	USAF Academy, Colorado	Falcons	Mountain West	NCAA D-I
University of Alaska Anchorage	Anchorage, Alaska	Seawolves	GNAC	NCAA D-II
Arizona State University	Tempe, Arizona	Sun Devils	Big 12	NCAA D-I
Augustana College (IL)	Rock Island, Illinois	Vikings	CCIW	NCAA D-III
Austin College	Sherman, Texas	Kangaroos	SCAC	NCAA D-III
Boise State University	Boise, Idaho	Broncos	Pac-12	NCAA D-I
Brigham Young University (BYU)	Provo, Utah	Cougars	Big 12	NCAA D-I
University of British Columbia (UBC)	Vancouver, British Columbia	Thunderbirds	Canada West	U Sports
California Baptist University	Riverside, California	Lancers	Big West	NCAA D-I
California Polytechnic State University (Cal Poly)	San Luis Obispo, California	Mustangs	Big West	NCAA D-I
California State Polytechnic University, Humboldt (Cal Poly Humboldt)	Arcata, California	Lumberjacks	CCAA	NCAA D-II
California State University, Fresno (Fresno State)	Fresno, California	Bulldogs	Pac-12	NCAA D-I
California State University, Fullerton	Fullerton, California	Titans	Big West	NCAA D-I
California State University, Long Beach (Long Beach State)	Long Beach, California	Beach	Big West	NCAA D-I
California State University, Northridge	Northridge, California	Matadors	Big West	NCAA D-I
California State University, Sacramento (Sacramento State)	Sacramento, California	Hornets	Big West	NCAA D-I
University of California, Berkeley (California)	Berkeley, California	Golden Bears	ACC	NCAA D-I
University of California, Davis (UC Davis)	Davis, California	Aggies	Mountain West	NCAA D-I
University of California, Irvine (UC Irvine)	Irvine, California	Anteaters	Big West	NCAA D-I
University of California, Los Angeles (UCLA)	Los Angeles, California	Bruins	Big Ten	NCAA D-I
University of California, Merced (UC Merced)	Merced, California	Bobcats	CCAA	NCAA D-II
University of California, Riverside (UC Riverside)	Riverside, California	Highlanders	Big West	NCAA D-I
University of California, San Diego (UC San Diego)	La Jolla, California	Tritons	Big West	NCAA D-I
Colorado State University	Fort Collins, Colorado	Rams	Pac-12	NCAA D-I
Concordia University Irvine	Irvine, California	Eagles	PacWest	NCAA D-II
Connecticut College	New London, Connecticut	Camels	NESCAC	NCAA D-III
University of Delaware	Newark, Delaware	Blue Hens	CUSA	NCAA D-I
Grand Canyon University	Phoenix, Arizona	Antelopes	Mountain West	NCAA D-I
Gonzaga University	Spokane, Washington	Bulldogs	Pac-12	NCAA D-I
University of Hawaiʻi at Mānoa (Hawai'i)	Honolulu, Hawaii	Rainbow Warriors & Rainbow Wahine	Mountain West	NCAA D-I
University of Idaho (Note: Returned to the MPSF in 2025.)	Moscow, Idaho	Vandals	Big Sky	NCAA D-I
University of the Incarnate Word (alternately UIW)	San Antonio, Texas	Cardinals	Southland	NCAA D-I
Indiana University Bloomington (Indiana)	Bloomington, Indiana	Hoosiers	Big Ten	NCAA D-I
Jessup University	Rocklin, California	Warriors	PacWest	NCAA D-II
Johns Hopkins University	Baltimore, Maryland	Blue Jays	Centennial	NCAA D-III
Louisiana State University (LSU)	Baton Rouge, Louisiana	Tigers	SEC	NCAA D-I
Menlo College	Atherton, California	Oaks	CCAA	NCAA D-II
University of Nevada, Las Vegas (UNLV)	Paradise, Nevada	Rebels	Mountain West	NCAA D-I
New Mexico State University	Las Cruces, New Mexico	Aggies	CUSA	NCAA D-I
Northern Arizona University	Flagstaff, Arizona	Lumberjacks	Big Sky	NCAA D-I
University of Northern Colorado	Greeley, Colorado	Bears	Big Sky	NCAA D-I
University of Oklahoma	Norman, Oklahoma	Sooners	SEC	NCAA D-I
University of Oregon	Eugene, Oregon	Ducks	Big Ten	NCAA D-I
Oregon State University	Corvallis, Oregon	Beavers	Pac-12	NCAA D-I
University of the Pacific	Stockton, California	Tigers	WCC	NCAA D-I
Pennsylvania State University, The Behrend College	Erie, Pennsylvania	Lions	AMCC	NCAA D-III
Pepperdine University	Malibu, California (Note: The campus has a Malibu mailing address but is entirely in unincorporated Los Angeles County.)	Waves	WCC	NCAA D-I
University of Portland	Portland, Oregon	Pilots	WCC	NCAA D-I
Queens University of Charlotte	Charlotte, North Carolina	Royals	ASUN	NCAA D-I
Saint Mary's College of California	Moraga, California	Gaels	WCC	NCAA D-I
University of San Diego	San Diego, California	Toreros	WCC	NCAA D-I
University of San Francisco	San Francisco, California	Dons	WCC	NCAA D-I
San Francisco State University	San Francisco, California	Gators	CCAA	NCAA D-II
San Jose State University	San Jose, California	Spartans	Mountain West	NCAA D-I
Santa Clara University	Santa Clara, California	Broncos	WCC	NCAA D-I
Seattle University	Seattle, Washington	Redhawks	WCC	NCAA D-I
University of Southern California (USC)	Los Angeles, California	Trojans	Big Ten	NCAA D-I
Stanford University	Stanford, California	Cardinal	ACC	NCAA D-I
University of Texas at Austin	Austin, Texas	Longhorns	SEC	NCAA D-I
Texas State University	San Marcos, Texas	Bobcats	Pac-12	NCAA D-I
Texas Woman's University	Denton, Texas	Pioneers	Lone Star	NCAA D-II
Utah State University	Logan, Utah	Aggies	Pac-12	NCAA D-I
Utah Tech University	St. George, Utah	Trailblazers	Big Sky	NCAA D-I
Utah Valley University	Orem, Utah	Wolverines	Big West	NCAA D-I
University of Texas Rio Grande Valley (UTRGV)	Edinburg, Texas	Vaqueros	Southland	NCAA D-I
Vanguard University	Costa Mesa, California	Lions	PacWest	NCAA D-II
University of Washington	Seattle, Washington	Huskies	Big Ten	NCAA D-I
Washington & Jefferson College	Washington, Pennsylvania	Presidents	PAC	NCAA D-III
Washington State University	Pullman, Washington	Cougars	Pac-12	NCAA D-I
Wheaton College (MA)	Norton, Massachusetts	Lyons	NEWMAC	NCAA D-III
University of Wyoming	Laramie, Wyoming	Cowboys	Mountain West	NCAA D-I

=== Former members ===
Institution	Location	Nickname	Primary conference (Note: Current affiliation; does not necessarily match affiliation(s) during a school's MPSF tenure.)	Division
University of Arizona	Tucson, Arizona	Wildcats	Big 12	NCAA D-I
University of Colorado Boulder	Boulder, Colorado	Buffaloes	Big 12	NCAA D-I
Florida State University (Note: Though initially slated to play in the MPSF in the 2025-26 season, they instead accepted an invitation to play in the Big 12 for the 2025-26 season.)	Tallahassee, Florida	Seminoles	ACC	NCAA D-I
Loyola Marymount University	Los Angeles, California	Lions	WCC	NCAA D-I
University of Nebraska–Lincoln	Lincoln, Nebraska	Cornhuskers	Big Ten	NCAA D-I
University of New Mexico	Albuquerque, New Mexico	Lobos	Mountain West	NCAA D-I
University of North Dakota	Grand Forks, North Dakota	Fighting Hawks	Summit	NCAA D-I
Seattle Pacific University	Seattle, Washington	Falcons	GNAC	NCAA D-II
University of South Carolina	Columbia, South Carolina	Gamecocks	SEC	NCAA D-I
Southern Utah University	Cedar City, Utah	Thunderbirds	Big Sky	NCAA D-I
University of Utah	Salt Lake City, Utah	Utes	Big 12	NCAA D-I

== Sports ==
The Mountain Pacific Sports Federation sponsors championship competition in six fully NCAA-sanctioned men's sports, six fully NCAA-sanctioned women's sports, one coeducational NCAA sport, and two non-NCAA sports (one each for men and women). The MPSF dropped men's soccer after the 2012 season. The moves of Denver (all sports) and New Mexico (soccer only) to other conferences left the MPSF with six soccer members, but all six would soon leave due to moves by the Western Athletic Conference. MPSF soccer member Seattle was already in the WAC, and another MPSF soccer school, CSU Bakersfield, was already committed to join the WAC in 2013. Because the WAC dropped football after the 2012 season due to a near-complete membership turnover, it needed to add another men's sport to maintain its Division I status. To that end, it invited the four remaining MPSF soccer schools to join them; all accepted, and the WAC began sponsoring men's soccer in 2013–14.

In October 2015, Arizona State announced that it would elevate its club team in women's lacrosse to full varsity status starting in the 2017–18 school year (2018 season), which will give the Pac-12 six women's lacrosse schools. This number is required by league bylaws for official sponsorship of a sport, and is also the number of teams required for a conference to be an automatic NCAA tournament qualifier. This led the Pac-12 to announce that all of its women's lacrosse teams would leave the MPSF for the new Pac-12 lacrosse league for the 2018 season. MPSF women's lacrosse continued to operate through the 2021 season, though it would lose its automatic NCAA tournament bid after the 2019 season.

The next major change in conference membership came in January 2016, when the Golden Coast Conference, a water polo-only league that previously operated only a women's competition, announced it would add a men's division effective with the 2016–17 season. The GCC took six of the 10 members of the MPSF men's water polo league, leaving the MPSF with only the four Pac-12 members that sponsor the sport.

On May 31, 2016, the Big West Conference announced that it would begin sponsoring men's volleyball in the 2017–18 school year (2018 season). The Big West men's volleyball league launched with full members Long Beach State, Cal State Northridge, UC Irvine, UC Santa Barbara and Hawai'i, plus associate member UC San Diego (which joined the Big West full-time in July 2020). UC San Diego left the federation with the launch of Big West men's volleyball, but the other Big West members remain in the MPSF in other sports. California Baptist also exited the MPSF after dropping its only conference sport of men's volleyball shortly after the 2017 season, and Cal State Bakersfield (now being rebranded athletically as Bakersfield) left the MPSF after dropping its last remaining conference sport of women's water polo at the same time.

It was announced in August 2021 that the MPSF would add fencing, a sport with a single coeducational NCAA team championship, to the conference as its tenth sport.

It was announced in September 2021 that the MPSF would add women's artistic swimming to the conference as the eleventh sport.

On November 9, 2023, the MPSF announced that it would add beach volleyball, a women-only sport at the NCAA level, for the 2025 season (2024–25 school year). The inaugural membership in that sport consisted mainly of schools that left the Pac-12 Conference, which sponsored beach volleyball, after 2023–24: California, Oregon, Stanford, UCLA, USC, and Washington. The only member not coming from the Pac-12 was Grand Canyon. The following month, the MPSF announced that Saint Mary's, which had been an MPSF member in women's lacrosse before the school dropped the sport in 2017, had returned to the conference in women's indoor track & field. The MPSF later announced it would also add the non-NCAA sport of men's rowing, plus men's and women's wrestling, in 2024–25.

The MPSF announced in February 2025 that it would add four beach volleyball members and seven swimming & diving members in 2025–26. Of the new swim/dive members, six field only women's teams and one fields teams for both men and women. However, the school that fields teams for both sexes, California Baptist, will only compete in the MPSF for one season, after which it becomes a full Big West member.

It was announced in September 2025 that the MPSF would add field hockey as its sixteenth sponsored sport in time for the 2025 fall season. Two members will participate in the MPSF's inaugural season: existing MPSF member UC Davis and newcomer Delaware.

Six schools joined for men's and/or women's swimming & diving for the 2026–27 season; most had previously been MPSF members in those sports. Most had previously housed those sports in the Big West Conference, which dropped both sports after the 2025–26 season.

MPSF teams
Sport	Men's	Women's
Artistic swimming	-	4
Beach volleyball	-	11
Gymnastics	4	4
Fencing	3	3
Field hockey	-	2
Rowing	8	–
STUNT	—	4
Swimming & diving	8	16
Indoor track & field	7	14
Volleyball	10	-
Water polo	11	7
Wrestling	4	2

=== Membership by sport ===
School	Artistic swimming	Beach volleyball	Fencing (Note: Coed sport.)	Field hockey	Men's gymnastics	Women's gymnastics	Men's indoor track & field	Women's indoor track & field	Men's rowing	STUNT	Men's swimming & diving	Women's swimming & diving	Men's volleyball	Men's water polo	Women's water polo	Men's wrestling	Women's wrestling	Total MPSF Sports
Air Force	✗	✗	✓	✗	✓	✗	✗	✗	✗	✗	✓	✗	✗	✗	✗	✗	✗	3
Alaska Anchorage	✗	✗	✗	✗	✗	✓	✗	✗	✗	✗	✗	✗	✗	✗	✗	✗	✗	1
Arizona State	✗	✗	✗	✗	✗	✗	✗	✗	✗	✗	✗	✗	✗	✗	✓	✗	✗	1
Augustana (IL)	✗	✗	✗	✗	✗	✗	✗	✗	✗	✗	✗	✗	✗	✓	✗	✗	✗	1
Austin	✗	✗	✗	✗	✗	✗	✗	✗	✗	✗	✗	✗	✗	✓	✗	✗	✗	1
BYU	✗	✗	✗	✗	✗	✗	✗	✗	✗	✗	✗	✗	✓	✗	✗	✗	✗	1
Cal Poly Humboldt	✗	✗	✗	✗	✗	✗	✗	✗	✗	✗	✗	✗	✗	✗	✗	✓	✗	1
Cal Poly SLO	✗	✗	✗	✗	✗	✗	✗	✗	✗	✓	✗	✗	✗	✗	✗	✗	✗	1
Cal State Fullerton	✗	✗	✗	✗	✗	✗	✓	✓	✗	✗	✗	✗	✗	✗	✗	✗	✗	2
Cal State Northridge	✗	✗	✗	✗	✗	✗	✓	✓	✗	✗	✗	✗	✗	✗	✗	✗	✗	2
California	✗	✓	✗	✗	✓	✗	✗	✗	✓	✗	✗	✗	✗	✓	✓	✗	✗	5
California Baptist	✗	✗	✗	✗	✗	✗	✗	✗	✗	✓	✓	✓	✗	✗	✗	✗	✗	3
Concordia–Irvine	✗	✗	✗	✗	✗	✗	✗	✗	✗	✗	✗	✗	✓	✗	✗	✗	✗	1
Connecticut College	✗	✗	✗	✗	✗	✗	✗	✗	✗	✗	✗	✗	✗	✓	✗	✗	✗	1
Delaware	✗	✗	✗	✓	✗	✗	✗	✗	✗	✗	✗	✗	✗	✗	✗	✗	✗	1
Grand Canyon	✗	✓	✗	✗	✗	✗	✗	✗	✗	✗	✗	✗	✗	✗	✗	✗	✗	1
Gonzaga	✗	✗	✗	✗	✗	✗	✗	✗	✓	✗	✗	✗	✗	✗	✗	✗	✗	1
Hawaii	✗	✗	✗	✗	✗	✗	✗	✓	✗	✗	✗	✗	✗	✗	✗	✗	✗	1
Idaho	✗	✗	✗	✗	✗	✗	✗	✗	✗	✗	✗	✓	✗	✗	✗	✗	✗	1
Incarnate Word	✓	✗	✓	✗	✗	✗	✗	✗	✗	✗	✓	✓	✗	✗	✗	✗	✗	4
Indiana	✗	✗	✗	✗	✗	✗	✗	✗	✗	✗	✗	✗	✗	✗	✓	✗	✗	1
Jessup	✗	✗	✗	✗	✗	✗	✗	✗	✗	✗	✗	✗	✓	✗	✗	✗	✗	1
Johns Hopkins	✗	✗	✗	✗	✗	✗	✗	✗	✗	✗	✗	✗	✗	✓	✗	✗	✗	1
Long Beach State	✗	✗	✗	✗	✗	✗	✓	✓	✗	✗	✗	✗	✗	✗	✗	✗	✗	2
LSU	✗	✓	✗	✗	✗	✗	✗	✗	✗	✗	✗	✗	✗	✗	✗	✗	✗	1
Menlo	✗	✗	✗	✗	✗	✗	✗	✗	✗	✗	✗	✗	✓	✗	✗	✓	✓	3
New Mexico State	✗	✗	✗	✗	✗	✗	✗	✗	✗	✗	✗	✓	✗	✗	✗	✗	✗	1
Northern Arizona	✗	✗	✗	✗	✗	✗	✗	✗	✗	✗	✗	✓	✗	✗	✗	✗	✗	1
Northern Colorado	✗	✗	✗	✗	✗	✗	✗	✗	✗	✗	✗	✓	✗	✗	✗	✗	✗	1
Oklahoma	✗	✗	✗	✗	✓	✗	✗	✗	✗	✗	✗	✗	✗	✗	✗	✗	✗	1
Oregon	✗	✓	✗	✗	✗	✗	✗	✗	✗	✗	✗	✗	✗	✗	✗	✗	✗	1
Oregon State	✗	✗	✗	✗	✗	✗	✗	✓	✓	✗	✗	✗	✗	✗	✗	✗	✗	2
Pacific	✗	✗	✗	✗	✗	✗	✓	✓	✗	✓	✓	✓	✗	✗	✗	✗	✗	5
Penn State Behrend	✗	✗	✗	✗	✗	✗	✗	✗	✗	✗	✗	✗	✗	✓	✗	✗	✗	1
Pepperdine	✗	✗	✗	✗	✗	✗	✗	✓	✗	✗	✗	✓	✓	✗	✗	✗	✗	3
Portland	✗	✗	✗	✗	✗	✗	✓	✓	✓	✗	✗	✗	✗	✗	✗	✗	✗	3
Queens	✗	✗	✗	✓	✗	✗	✗	✗	✗	✗	✗	✗	✗	✗	✗	✗	✗	1
Sacramento State	✗	✗	✗	✗	✗	✓	✗	✗	✗	✗	✗	✗	✗	✗	✗	✗	✗	1
Saint Mary's	✗	✗	✗	✗	✗	✗	✗	✓	✗	✗	✗	✗	✗	✗	✗	✗	✗	1
San Diego	✗	✗	✗	✗	✗	✗	✗	✗	✓	✗	✗	✓	✗	✗	✗	✗	✗	2
San Francisco	✗	✗	✗	✗	✗	✗	✗	✓	✗	✗	✗	✗	✗	✗	✗	✗	✗	1
San Francisco State	✗	✗	✗	✗	✗	✗	✗	✗	✗	✗	✗	✗	✗	✗	✗	✓	✗	1
San Jose State	✗	✓	✗	✗	✗	✗	✗	✗	✗	✗	✗	✗	✗	✗	✓	✗	✗	2
Santa Clara	✗	✗	✗	✗	✗	✗	✗	✗	✓	✗	✗	✓	✗	✗	✗	✗	✗	1
South Carolina	✗	✓	✗	✗	✗	✗	✗	✗	✗	✗	✗	✗	✗	✗	✗	✗	✗	1
Southern Utah	✗	✗	✗	✗	✗	✓	✗	✗	✗	✗	✗	✗	✗	✗	✗	✗	✗	1
Stanford	✓	✓	✗	✗	✓	✗	✗	✗	✓	✗	✗	✗	✓	✓	✓	✗	✗	7
Texas	✗	✓	✗	✗	✗	✗	✗	✗	✗	✗	✗	✗	✗	✗	✗	✗	✗	1
Texas Woman's	✓	✗	✗	✗	✗	✗	✗	✗	✗	✗	✗	✗	✗	✗	✗	✗	✗	1
UC Davis	✗	✗	✗	✓	✗	✓	✗	✓	✗	✓	✗	✗	✗	✗	✗	✗	✗	3
UC Irvine	✗	✗	✗	✗	✗	✗	✗	✓	✗	✗	✗	✗	✗	✗	✗	✗	✗	1
UC Merced	✗	✗	✗	✗	✗	✗	✗	✗	✗	✗	✗	✗	✓	✗	✗	✗	✗	1
UC Riverside	✗	✗	✗	✗	✗	✗	✓	✓	✗	✗	✗	✗	✗	✗	✗	✗	✗	2
UC San Diego	✗	✗	✓	✗	✗	✗	✗	✗	✓	✗	✗	✗	✗	✗	✗	✗	✗	2
UCLA	✗	✓	✗	✗	✗	✗	✗	✗	✗	✗	✗	✗	✓	✓	✓	✗	✗	4
USC	✗	✓	✗	✗	✗	✗	✗	✗	✗	✗	✗	✗	✓	✓	✓	✗	✗	4
Utah Tech	✗	✗	✗	✗	✗	✗	✗	✗	✗	✗	✗	✓	✗	✗	✗	✗	✗	1
UTRGV	✗	✗	✗	✗	✗	✗	✗	✗	✗	✗	✗	✓	✗	✗	✗	✗	✗	1
Vanguard	✗	✗	✗	✗	✗	✗	✗	✗	✗	✗	✗	✗	✓	✗	✗	✓	✓	3
Washington	✗	✓	✗	✗	✗	✗	✗	✗	✓	✗	✗	✗	✗	✗	✗	✗	✗	2
Washington & Jefferson	✗	✗	✗	✗	✗	✗	✗	✗	✗	✗	✗	✗	✗	✓	✗	✗	✗	1
Washington State	✗	✗	✗	✗	✗	✗	✓	✓	✗	✗	✗	✗	✗	✗	✗	✗	✗	2
Wheaton (MA)	✓	✗	✗	✗	✗	✗	✗	✗	✗	✗	✗	✗	✗	✗	✗	✗	✗	1
Wyoming	✗	✗	✗	✗	✗	✗	✗	✗	✗	✗	✓	✗	✗	✗	✗	✗	✗	1
Totals	4	11	3	2	4	4	7	14	9	4	5	10	10	11	7	4	2	

== Aquatics ==
Two aquatics disciplines are sponsored under the aquatics section, with swimming & diving sponsored for both men and women since 2010–11 and the women-only discipline of artistic swimming added in 2021–22. A third discipline, open water swimming, was added for both men and women in 2023–24, but is not sponsored as a conference sport, instead being a de facto national championship meet open to all NCAA members. The MPSF was the first NCAA conference to sponsor open water swimming.

In June 2023, the Big West announced the addition of men's and women's swimming and diving as a sponsored sport beginning in the 2024–25 school year. As a result, six Big West members moved their aquatics programs to their primary conference, including three members (Bakersfield, Cal Poly, and UC Santa Barbara) who were only MPSF members in aquatics and thus effectively left the MPSF.

The MPSF lost one member (San Diego to the Big West) and added seven members in swimming & diving in 2025–26. Of the new members, six joined for the women's sport only and the other with both men's and women's teams. One of these schools had previously housed the women's sport in the MPSF. In 2026–27, six schools joined or rejoined for men's and/or women's swimming & diving, following the Big West dropping both sports. One of the returning schools was the aforementioned San Diego (women only).

=== Current members ===
Institution	Location	Nickname	Artistic	Men	Women	Primary conference	Joined
United States Air Force Academy	Colorado Springs, Colorado	Falcons	✗	✓	✗	Mountain West	2025 (Note: Air Force, UNLV, and Wyoming have previously been MPSF members in men's swimming & diving from 2011–2013.) (Note: Air Force, UNLV, and Wyoming will only compete in the MPSF in the 2025–26 season; they will move their programs to their primary conference, the Mountain West Conference, when it begins sponsorship of men's swimming and diving in July 2026.)
California Baptist University	Riverside, California	Lancers	✗	✓	✓	WAC	2025
University of Idaho	Moscow, Idaho	Vandals	✗	✗	✓	Big Sky	2025
University of the Incarnate Word	San Antonio, Texas	Cardinals	✓	✓	✓	Southland	2021 (A); 2022 (M/W)
University of Nevada, Las Vegas	Las Vegas, Nevada	Rebels	✗	✓	✗	Mountain West	2025
New Mexico State University	Las Cruces, New Mexico	Aggies	✗	✗	✓	CUSA	2025
Northern Arizona University	Flagstaff, Arizona	Lumberjacks	✗	✗	✓	Big Sky	2025
University of Northern Colorado	Greeley, Colorado	Bears	✗	✗	✓	Big Sky	2025 (Note: Northern Colorado had previously been an MPSF member in women's swimming & diving from 2010–2012.)
University of the Pacific	Stockton, California	Tigers	✗	✓	✓	WCC	2010 (M/W)
Pepperdine University	Malibu, California	Waves	✗	✗	✓	WCC	2023
Stanford University	Stanford, California	Cardinal	✓	✗	✗	ACC	2021
Utah Tech University	St. George, Utah	Trailblazers	✗	✗	✓	WAC	2025
University of Texas Rio Grande Valley (UTRGV)	Edinburg, Texas (Note: UTRGV has multiple campuses within its service area of the Lower Rio Grande Valley, but the athletic administration is based at the Edinburg campus it inherited from its athletic predecessor of the University of Texas–Pan American.)	Vaqueros	✗	✗	✓	Southland	2025
Texas Woman's University	Denton, Texas	Pioneers	✓	✗	✗	Lone Star	2021
Wheaton College (MA)	Norton, Massachusetts	Lyons	✓	✗	✗	NEWMAC	2021
University of Wyoming	Laramie, Wyoming	Cowboys	✗	✓	✗	Mountain West	2025

=== Future members ===
Institution	Location	Nickname	Artistic	Men	Women	Primary conference	Joining
California State University, Bakersfield	Bakersfield, California	Roadrunners	✗	✓	✓	Big West	2026
University of Denver	Denver, Colorado	Pioneers	✗	✓	✓	Summit League (WCC in 2026)	2026
Saint Mary's College of California	Moraga, California	Gaels	✗	✓	✓	WCC	2026
University of San Diego	San Diego, California	Toreros	✗	✗	✓	WCC	2026
Seattle University	Seattle, Washington	Redhawks	✗	✓	✓	WCC	2026
University of California, San Diego	La Jolla, California	Tritons	✗	✓	✓	Big West (WCC in 2027)	2026
University of California, Santa Barbara	Isla Vista, California	Gauchos	✗	✓	✓	Big West (WCC in 2027)	2026

=== Former members ===
Institution	Location	Nickname	Team	Primary conference	Joined	Left
Brigham Young University	Provo, Utah	Cougars	Men; Women	Big 12	2011	2023
California Polytechnic State University (Cal Poly)	San Luis Obispo, California	Mustangs	Men	Big West	2014	2024
California Polytechnic State University (Cal Poly)	San Luis Obispo, California	Mustangs	Women	Big West	2010	2024
California State University, Bakersfield (Cal State Bakersfield or Bakersfield)	Bakersfield, California	Roadrunners	Men	Big West	2010	2024
California State University, Bakersfield (Cal State Bakersfield or Bakersfield)	Bakersfield, California	Roadrunners	Women	Big West	2021	2024
Loyola Marymount University	Los Angeles, California	Lions	Women	WCC	2010	2014
Seattle University	Seattle, Washington	Redhawks	Men	WCC	2010	2013
Seattle University	Seattle, Washington	Redhawks	Women	WCC	2010	2012
University of California, Davis (UC Davis)	Davis, California	Aggies	Women	Big West (MW in 2026)	2010	2024
University of California, San Diego (UC San Diego)	La Jolla, California	Tritons	Men & Women	Big West	2018	2024
University of California, Santa Barbara (UC Santa Barbara)	Isla Vista, California	Gauchos	Men	Big West	2014	2024
University of California, Santa Barbara (UC Santa Barbara)	Isla Vista, California	Gauchos	Women	Big West	2010	2024
University of Denver	Denver, Colorado	Pioneers	Men	Summit	2012	2013
University of Hawaiʻi at Mānoa	Honolulu, Hawaii	Rainbow Warriors & Rainbow Wahine	Men	Big West (MW in 2026)	2012	2024
University of Hawaiʻi at Mānoa	Honolulu, Hawaii	Rainbow Warriors & Rainbow Wahine	Women	Big West (MW in 2026)	2011	2024
University of North Dakota	Grand Forks, North Dakota	Fighting Hawks	Men	Summit	2011	2013
University of San Diego	San Diego, California	Toreros	Women	WCC	2010	2025

=== Timeline ===
All aquatic sports Men's & women's swimming & diving Women's swimming & diving Men's swimming & diving Artistic swimming

=== Conference Champions ===
Year	Men	Women
2010–11	CSU Bakersfield	UC Davis
2011–12	Brigham Young	Brigham Young
2012–13	UNLV	UC Davis
2013–14	Brigham Young	UC Davis
2014–15	Brigham Young	Hawaii
2015–16	Brigham Young	UC Davis
2016–17	UC Santa Barbara	Hawaii
2017–18	UC Santa Barbara	Hawaii
2018–19	Hawaii	Hawaii
2019–20	Hawaii	Hawaii
2020–21	Brigham Young	Hawaii
2021–22	Brigham Young	UC San Diego
2022–23	Brigham Young	Hawaii
2023–24	Hawaii	Hawaii
2024–25	Pacific	Pepperdine
2025–26	Air Force	Northern Arizona

== Fencing ==
Fencing was introduced as an MPSF sport in the 2021–22 season.

=== Current members ===
The MPSF currently has three members that participate in fencing.

Institution	Location	Nickname	Primary conference	Joined
United States Air Force Academy	USAF Academy, Colorado	Falcons	Mountain West	2021
University of California, San Diego	La Jolla, California	Tritons	Big West	2021
University of the Incarnate Word	San Antonio, Texas	Cardinals	Southland	2021

=== Former members ===
Institution	Location	Nickname	Primary conference	Joined	Left
Stanford University	Stanford, California	Cardinal	ACC	2021	2024

=== Timeline ===
Fencing members

=== Conference Champions ===
Year	Men	Women
2021–22	Stanford	
2022–23	Stanford	
2023–24	Stanford	
2024–25	UC San Diego	UC San Diego
2025–26	Air Force	UC San Diego

== Gymnastics ==
Men's gymnastics was introduced as an MPSF sport with the formation of the conference while women's gymnastics was initiated for the 2001–02 season.

=== Current members ===
The MPSF currently has four members that participate in men's gymnastics and two for women's.

Institution	Location	Nickname	Men	Women	Primary conference	Joined
United States Air Force Academy	USAF Academy, Colorado	Falcons	✓	✗	Mountain West	1992
University of Alaska Anchorage	Anchorage, Alaska	Seawolves	✗	✓	GNAC (NCAA D-II)	2002 (Note: Did not compete in the 2020–21 season.)
University of California, Berkeley	Berkeley, California	Golden Bears	✓	✗	ACC	1992
California State University, Sacramento	Sacramento, California	Hornets	✗	✓	Big West	2001; 2013
University of Oklahoma	Norman, Oklahoma	Sooners	✓	✗	SEC	1992
Stanford University	Stanford, California	Cardinal	✓	✗	ACC	1992

=== Former members ===
Institution	Location	Nickname	Team	Primary conference	Joined	Left
United States Air Force Academy	USAF Academy, Colorado	Falcons	Women	Mountain West	2001	2023
Brigham Young University	Provo, Utah	Cougars	Men	Big 12	1992	2000
University of California, Davis	Davis, California	Aggies	Women	Mountain West	2001	2026
University of California, Los Angeles	Los Angeles, California	Bruins	Men	Big Ten	1992	1994
University of California, Santa Barbara	Isla Vista, California	Gauchos	Men	Big West (West Coast in 2027)	1992	2002
University of California, Santa Barbara	Isla Vista, California	Gauchos	Women	Big West (West Coast in 2027)	2001	2002
University of Nebraska–Lincoln	Lincoln, Nebraska	Cornhuskers	Men	Big Ten	1994	2011
University of New Mexico	Albuquerque, New Mexico	Lobos	Men	Mountain West	1992	1999
San Jose State University	San Jose, California	Spartans	Men	Mountain West	1992	1997
San Jose State University	San Jose, California	Spartans	Women	Mountain West	2001	2005
San Jose State University	San Jose, California	Spartans	Women	Mountain West	2013	2023
Seattle Pacific University	Seattle, Washington	Falcons	Women	GNAC (NCAA D-II)	2002	2020
Southern Utah University	Cedar City, Utah	Thunderbirds	Women	Big Sky (Note: Southern Utah became a Pac-12 Conference women's gymnastics member in 2026, coinciding with its move to the non-gymnastics Big Sky Conference.)	2023	2026
Utah State University	Logan, Utah	Aggies	Women	Pac-12	2012	2013

=== Timeline ===
Men's & women's gymnastics Women's gymnastics Men's gymnastics

=== Conference champions ===
Year	Men	Women
1992–93	Stanford	—N/a
1993–94	UCLA	—N/a
1994–95	Stanford	—N/a
1995–96	Oklahoma	—N/a
1996–97	Nebraska	—N/a
1997–98	California	—N/a
1998–99	Nebraska	—N/a
1998–99	Oklahoma	—N/a
1999–00	Oklahoma	—N/a
2000–01	Oklahoma	—N/a
2001–02	Oklahoma	Sacramento State
2002–03	Oklahoma	Sacramento State
2003–04	California	San Jose State
2004–05	Oklahoma	Sacramento State
2005–06	Oklahoma	Seattle Pacific
2006–07	Oklahoma	Seattle Pacific
2007–08	Oklahoma	UC Davis
2008–09	Stanford	Alaska–Anchorage
2009–10	Oklahoma	UC Davis
2010–11	Stanford	UC Davis
2011–12	Oklahoma	UC Davis
2012–13	Oklahoma	UC Davis
2013–14	Oklahoma	Sacramento State
2014–15	Oklahoma	UC Davis
2015–16	Oklahoma	Sacramento State
2016–17	Oklahoma	San Jose State
2017–18	Oklahoma	San Jose State
2018–19	Oklahoma	Air Force
2019–20	—N/a	—N/a
2020–21	Oklahoma	—N/a
2021–22	Stanford	San Jose State
2022–23	Stanford	UC Davis
2023–24	Stanford	Southern Utah
2024–25	Oklahoma	Southern Utah

=== National champions ===
Year	Team
1993	Stanford (M)
1995	Stanford (M)
1997	California (M)
1998	California (M)
2002	Oklahoma (M)
2003	Oklahoma (M)
2005	Oklahoma (M)
2006	Oklahoma (M)
2008	Oklahoma (M)
2009	Stanford (M)
2011	Stanford (M)
2015	Oklahoma (M)
2016	Oklahoma (M)
2017	Oklahoma (M)
2018	Oklahoma (M)
2019	Stanford (M)
2021	Stanford (M)
2022	Stanford (M)
2023	Stanford (M)
2024	Stanford (M)

== Indoor track and field ==
Men's and women's indoor track and field were introduced for the 1992–93 season as one of the conference's inaugural sports. Conference records before 1999 are incomplete.

=== Current members ===
Institution	Location	Nickname	Men	Women	Primary conference	Joined
California State University, Fullerton	Fullerton, California	Titans	✓	✓	Big West	2021 (M); 2013 (W)
California State University, Northridge	Northridge, California	Matadors	✓	✓	Big West	1994, 2001, 2007 (M); 1992, 2001, 2007 (W) (Note: Cal State Northridge's men's and women's teams departed in 1996 before rejoining in 2001 but then departed again in 2005 to rejoin for a second time in 2007.)
California State University, Long Beach	Long Beach, California	Beach	✓	✓	Big West	1995
University of Hawaiʻi at Mānoa	Honolulu, Hawaii	Rainbow Warriors & Rainbow Wahine	✗	✓	Big West (MW in 2026)	2012
Oregon State University	Corvallis, Oregon	Beavers	✗	✓	Pac-12	2014, 2024 (Note: The Oregon State women's team left in 2020 when the Pac-12 began sponsoring indoor track. OSU rejoined the MPSF following the 2024 collapse of the Pac-12.)
University of the Pacific	Stockton, California	Tigers	✓	✓	WCC	2025
Pepperdine University	Malibu, California	Waves	✗	✓	WCC	2022
University of Portland	Portland, Oregon	Pilots	✓	✓	WCC	1995, 2014 (M); 1993, 2014 (W) (Note: Portland's men's team departed in 1996 and the women's team departed in 1999 before both teams rejoined in 2014.)
Saint Mary's College of California	Moraga, California	Gaels	✗	✓	WCC	2024
University of San Francisco	San Francisco, California	Dons	✗	✓	WCC	2017
University of California, Davis	Davis, California	Aggies	✗ (Note: UC Davis sponsored a men's team that competed in the MPSF from 2004-2005.)	✓	Big West (MW in 2026)	2004, 2017 (Note: UC Davis' women's team departed in 2005 before rejoining in 2017.)
University of California, Irvine	Irvine, California	Anteaters	✗	✓	Big West	2002, 2010 (Note: UC Irvine's women's team departed in 2007 before rejoining in 2010.)
University of California, Riverside	Riverside, California	Highlanders	✓	✓	Big West	2001, 2016 (Note: UC Riverside's men's and women's teams departed in 2002 before rejoining in 2016.)
Washington State University	Pullman, Washington	Cougars	✓	✓	Pac-12	1993, 2024 (Note: The Washington State men's and women's teams left in 2020 when the Pac-12 began sponsoring indoor track. Both rejoined the MPSF following the 2024 collapse of the Pac-12.)

=== Future members ===
Institution	Location	Nickname	Men	Women	Primary conference	Joining
Boise State University	Boise, Idaho	Boise State	✓	✓	Mountain West (Pac-12 in 2026)	2026
Colorado State University	Fort Collins, Colorado	Rams	✓	✓	Mountain West (Pac-12 in 2026)	2026
Sacramento State University	Sacramento, California	Hornets	✓	✓	Big Sky (Big West in 2026)	2026
San Diego State University	San Diego, California	Aztecs	✗	✓	Mountain West (Pac-12 in 2026)	2026
University of California, Santa Barbara	Isla Vista, California	Gauchos	✗	✓	Big West (WCC in 2027)	2026
Utah State University	Logan, Utah	Aggies	✓	✓	Mountain West (Pac-12 in 2026)	2026
Utah Valley University	Orem, Utah	Wolverines	✓	✓	WAC (Big West in 2026)	2026

=== Former members ===
Institution	Location	Nickname	Team	Primary conference	Joined	Left
University of Arizona	Tucson, Arizona	Wildcats	Men & Women	Big 12	1993	2020
Arizona State University	Tempe, Arizona	Sun Devils	Men & Women	Big 12	1996; 2006	2002; 2020
Brigham Young University	Provo, Utah	Cougars	Men & Women	Big 12	2011	2023
California Polytechnic State University	San Luis Obispo, California	Mustangs	Women	Big West	2002	2006
University of California, Berkeley	Berkeley, California	Golden Bears	Men & Women	ACC	1992	2020
University of California, Davis	Davis, California	Aggies	Men	Big West (MW in 2026)	2004	2005
University of California, Los Angeles	Los Angeles, California	Bruins	Men	Big Ten	2000	2020
University of California, Los Angeles	Los Angeles, California	Bruins	Women	Big Ten	1996	2020
University of Colorado Boulder	Boulder, Colorado	Buffaloes	Men & Women	Big 12	2011	2020
University of Idaho	Moscow, Idaho	Vandals	Men	Big Sky	1995; 2002	1997; 2004
University of Idaho	Moscow, Idaho	Vandals	Women	Big Sky	1995	1996
University of Nevada, Las Vegas	Paradise, Nevada	Rebels	Women	Mountain West	1992	1996
University of Nevada, Reno	Reno, Nevada	Wolf Pack	Women	Mountain West	1992	2000
University of Oregon	Eugene, Oregon	Ducks	Men & Women	Big Ten	1992	2020
University of Southern California	Los Angeles, California	Trojans	Men & Women	Big Ten	2013	2020
Stanford University	Stanford, California	Cardinal	Men & Women	ACC	1992	2020
University of Utah	Salt Lake City, Utah	Utes	Women	Big 12	2011	2020
Utah State University	Logan, Utah	Aggies	Men & Women	Mountain West (Pac-12 in 2026)	1992	2004
University of Washington	Seattle, Washington	Huskies	Men & Women	Big Ten	1992	2020

=== Conference champions ===
Year	Men	Women
1992–93	California	UNLV
1993–94	Arizona	Utah State
1994–95	Arizona	Arizona
1995–96	Arizona	Washington
1996–97	Idaho	Stanford
1997–98	Washington State	Stanford
1998–99	Stanford	Washington State
1999–00	Stanford	Washington State
2000–01	Washington State	Arizona
2001–02	UCLA	Arizona
2002–03	UCLA	Stanford
2003–04	UCLA	Stanford
2004–05	UCLA	Stanford
2005–06	Washington	Stanford
2006–07	Washington	Arizona State
2007–08	Oregon	Arizona State
2008–09	UCLA	Stanford
2009–10	UCLA	Oregon
2010–11	Stanford	Oregon
2011–12	Arizona State	Stanford
2012–13	Arizona State	Oregon
2013–14	California	USC
2014–15	Oregon	USC
2015–16	USC	Oregon
2016–17	Oregon	USC
2017–18	USC	USC
2018–19	Brigham Young	USC
2019–20	Brigham Young	Oregon
2020–21	—N/a	—N/a
2021–22	BYU	BYU
2022–23	BYU	BYU
2023–24	Long Beach State	Long Beach State
2024–25	Washington State	Oregon State
2025–26	Cal State Fullerton	UC Irvine

=== National champions ===
Year	Team
1999–00	UCLA (W)
2000–01	UCLA (W)
2006–07	Arizona State (W)
2007–08	Arizona State (M)
2007–08	Arizona State (W)
2008–09	Oregon (M)
2009–10	Oregon (W)
2010–11	Oregon (W)
2011–12	Oregon (W)
2012–13	Oregon (W)
2013–14	Oregon (M)
2013–14	Oregon (W)
2014–15	Oregon (M)
2015–16	Oregon (M)
2015–16	Oregon (W)
2016–17	Oregon (W)
2020–21	Oregon (M)

== Rowing ==
Men's rowing became an MPSF sport in the 2024–25 season.

=== Current members ===
The MPSF men's rowing league started with eight members.

Institution	Location	Nickname	Primary conference	Joined
University of British Columbia	Vancouver, British Columbia	Thunderbirds	Canada West	2025
University of California, Berkeley (California)	Berkeley, California	Golden Bears	ACC	2024
Gonzaga University	Spokane, Washington	Bulldogs	WCC (Pac-12 in 2026)	2024
Oregon State University	Corvallis, Oregon	Beavers	Pac-12	2024
University of San Diego	San Diego, California	Toreros	WCC	2024
Santa Clara University	Santa Clara, California	Broncos	WCC	2024
Stanford University	Stanford, California	Cardinal	ACC	2024
University of California, San Diego (UC San Diego)	La Jolla, California	Tritons	Big West	2024
University of Washington	Seattle, Washington	Huskies	Big Ten	2024

== STUNT ==
On June 23, 2026, it was announced that STUNT would become the conference's seventeenth sponsored sport, the most it's ever sponsored in its history. In January 2026, it was announced by the NCAA that the sport would achieve championship status, with the first official NCAA championship being held in the 2026–27 season. In its inaugural season, the MPSF will have four universities compete in the sport.

Institution	Location	Nickname	Primary conference	Joined
California Baptist University	Riverside, California	Lancers	Big West	2026
California Polytechnic State University, San Luis Obispo	San Luis Obispo, California	Mustangs	Big West	2026
University of California, Davis	Davis, California	Aggies	Mountain West	2026
University of the Pacific	Stockton, California	Tigers	WCC	2026

== Volleyball ==
Men's volleyball was introduced for the 1993 season (1992–93 school year) as one of the conference's inaugural sports. The MPSF added beach volleyball in the 2025 season (2024–25 school year). The MPSF added the sport in the wake of the collapse of the Pac-12 Conference, which saw 10 of its 12 members leave for other conferences after the 2023–24 school year. Of the 10 departing schools, nine sponsor beach volleyball. Three left for the Big 12 Conference, which announced it would start sponsoring beach volleyball in 2024–25. The other six, which joined either the Atlantic Coast Conference or the Big Ten Conference, made up almost all of the inaugural MPSF beach volleyball membership. California, Stanford, UCLA, and USC were already MPSF members in other sports, and Oregon and Washington were returning MPSF members. The only inaugural beach volleyball member not arriving from the Pac-12 is Grand Canyon.

After the spring 2025 season, the MPSF added five more beach volleyball members—Florida State, LSU, San Jose State, South Carolina, and Texas. All but San Jose State departed the disbanding Coastal Collegiate Sports Association. However, it was announced on September 24, 2025, that Florida State and South Carolina would instead compete in the Big 12 Conference for the 2025–26 season, rather than the MPSF. Its men's division lost Grand Canyon, which downgraded the sport to club status, but added Jessup and UC Merced, both transitioning from the NAIA to NCAA Division II. Pacific, which dropped men's volleyball in 2014, reinstated the sport in the 2026–27 school year and rejoined the MPSF.

=== Current members ===
Institution	Location	Nickname	Men	Women (beach)	Primary conference	Joined
Brigham Young University	Provo, Utah	Cougars	✓	✗	Big 12	1992
University of California, Berkeley	Berkeley, California	Golden Bears	✗	✓	ACC	2024
Concordia University Irvine	Irvine, California	Eagles	✓	✗	PacWest	2017
Grand Canyon University	Phoenix, Arizona	Antelopes	✗	✓	MW	2024
Jessup University	Rocklin, California	Warriors	✓	✗	PacWest	2025
Louisiana State University	Baton Rouge, Louisiana	Tigers	✗	✓	SEC	2025
Menlo College	Atherton, California	Oaks	✓	✗	PacWest	2024
University of Oregon	Eugene, Oregon	Ducks	✗	✓	Big Ten	2024
University of the Pacific	Stockton, California	Tigers	✓	✗	WCC (Note: When Pacific first joined MPSF men's volleyball in 1992, it was a member of the Big West Conference. It joined the West Coast Conference in 2013.)	1992 (Note: Pacific dropped men's volleyball in 2014.)
University of the Pacific	Stockton, California	Tigers	✓	✗	WCC	2026
Pepperdine University	Malibu, California	Waves	✓	✗	WCC	1992
San Jose State University	San Jose, California	Spartans	✗	✓	MW	2025
Stanford University	Stanford, California	Cardinal	✓	✓	ACC	1992 (M); 2024 (W)
University of Texas at Austin	Austin, Texas	Longhorns	✗	✓	SEC	2025
University of California, Merced	Merced, California	Golden Bobcats	✓	✗	CCAA	2025
University of California, Los Angeles	Los Angeles, California (Westwood)	Bruins	✓	✓	Big Ten	1992 (M); 2024 (W)
University of Southern California	Los Angeles, California (South Los Angeles)	Trojans	✓	✓	Big Ten	1992 (M); 2024 (W)
Vanguard University	Costa Mesa, California	Lions	✓	✗	PacWest	2024
University of Washington	Seattle, Washington	Huskies	✗	✓	Big Ten	2024

=== Former members ===
Institution	Location	Nickname	Team	Primary conference	Joined	Left
California Baptist University	Riverside, California	Lancers	Men	Big West	2012	2017
California State University, Long Beach	Long Beach, California	Beach	Men	Big West	1992	2017
California State University, Northridge	Northridge, California	Matadors	Men	Big West	1992	2017
University of California, Irvine	Irvine, California	Anteaters	Men	Big West	1992	2017
University of California, San Diego	La Jolla, California	Tritons	Men	Big West (West Coast in 2027)	1992	2017
University of California, Santa Barbara	Isla Vista, California	Gauchos	Men	Big West (West Coast in 2027)	1992	2017
Grand Canyon University	Phoenix, Arizona	Antelopes	Men	Mountain West	2017	2025
University of Hawaiʻi at Mānoa	Honolulu, Hawai'i	Rainbow Warriors & Rainbow Wahine	Men	Mountain West	1992	2017
Loyola Marymount University	Los Angeles, California	Lions	Men	WCC	1992	2000
San Diego State University	San Diego, California	Aztecs	Men	Pac-12	1992	2000

=== Timeline ===
Men's & women's (beach) volleyball Women's (beach) volleyball Men's volleyball

=== Conference champions ===
Year	Men	Women (Beach)
1993	UCLA	—N/a
1994	UCLA (2)	—N/a
1995	UCLA (3)	—N/a
1996	UCLA (4)	—N/a
1997	Stanford	—N/a
1998	Pepperdine	—N/a
1999	Brigham Young	—N/a
2000	UCLA (5)	—N/a
2001	UCLA (6)	—N/a
2002	Pepperdine (2)	—N/a
2003	Brigham Young (2)	—N/a
2004	Brigham Young (3)	—N/a
2005	Pepperdine (3)	—N/a
2006	UCLA (7)	—N/a
2007	UC Irvine	—N/a
2008	Pepperdine (4)	—N/a
2009	USC	—N/a
2010	Stanford (2)	—N/a
2011	UC Santa Barbara	—N/a
2012	UC Irvine (2)	—N/a
2013	Brigham Young (4)	—N/a
2014	Brigham Young (5)	—N/a
2015	UC Irvine (3)	—N/a
2016	Brigham Young (6)	—N/a
2017	Long Beach State	—N/a
2018	Brigham Young (7)	—N/a
2019	Pepperdine (5)	—N/a
2020	—N/a	—N/a
2021	Brigham Young (8)	—N/a
2022	Pepperdine (6)	—N/a
2023	UCLA (8)	—N/a
2024	Grand Canyon	—N/a
2025	Pepperdine (7)	Stanford

=== National champions ===
All national champions are in men's volleyball.

Year	Team
1993	UCLA
1995	UCLA
1996	UCLA
1997	Stanford
1998	UCLA
1999	Brigham Young
2000	UCLA
2001	Brigham Young
2002	Hawaii†
2004	Brigham Young
2005	Pepperdine
2006	UCLA (6)
2007	UC Irvine
2009	UC Irvine
2010	Stanford
2012	UC Irvine
2013	UC Irvine
2023	UCLA
2024	UCLA

† — Vacated due to NCAA violations

== Conference champions ==
=== Women's lacrosse ===
Year	Team
2004	California
2005	Stanford
2006	Stanford
2007	Stanford
2008	Stanford
2009	Stanford
2010	Stanford
2011	Stanford
2012	Oregon
2013	Stanford
2014	Denver
2015	Stanford
2016	USC
2017	USC
2018	San Diego State
2019	San Diego State
2020	N/A
2021	UC Davis

=== Men's soccer ===
Year	Team
1992	Washington
1993	UCLA
1994	Fresno State
1995	UCLA
1996	UCLA
1997	UCLA
1998	Washington
1999	Washington
2000	San Jose State
2001	New Mexico
2002	New Mexico
2003	San Jose State
2004	New Mexico
2005	New Mexico
2006	New Mexico
2007	New Mexico
2008	Denver
2009	Sacramento State
2010	Sacramento State
2011	New Mexico
2012	Air Force

=== Men's track & field indoor ===
Year	Team
1992–93	California
1993–94	Arizona
1994–95	Arizona
1995–96	Arizona
1996–97	Idaho
1997–98	Washington State
1998–99	Stanford
1999–00	Stanford
2000–01	Washington State
2001–02	UCLA
2002–03	UCLA
2003–04	UCLA
2004–05	UCLA
2005–06	Washington
2006–07	Washington
2007–08	Oregon
2008–09	UCLA
2009–10	UCLA
2010–11	Stanford
2011–12	Arizona State
2012–13	Arizona State
2013–14	California
2014–15	Oregon
2015–16	USC
2016–17	Oregon
2017–18	USC
2018–19	Brigham Young
2019–20	Brigham Young
2020–21	N/A

=== Women's track & field indoor ===
Year	Team
1992–93	UNLV
1993–94	Utah State
1994–95	Arizona
1995–96	Washington
1996–97	Stanford
1997–98	Stanford
1998–99	Washington State
1999–00	Washington State
2000–01	Arizona
2001–02	Arizona
2002–03	Stanford
2003–04	Stanford
2004–05	Stanford
2005–06	Stanford
2006–07	Arizona State
2007–08	Arizona State
2008–09	Stanford
2009–10	Oregon
2010–11	Oregon
2011–12	Stanford
2012–13	Oregon
2013–14	USC
2014–15	USC
2015–16	Oregon
2016–17	USC
2017–18	USC
2018–19	USC
2019–20	Oregon
2020–21	N/A

=== Men's water polo ===
Year	Team
1992	California
1993	California
1994	Stanford
1995	California
1996	USC
1997	USC
1998	Stanford
1999	UCLA
2000	UCLA
2001	Stanford
2002	California
2003	USC
2004	Stanford
2005	USC
2006	California
2007	USC
2008	USC
2009	UCLA
2010	USC
2011	UCLA
2012	USC
2013	USC
2014	UCLA
2015	UCLA
2016	California
2017	USC
2018	Stanford
2019	Stanford
2020	Stanford
2021	UCLA
2022	USC (12)
2023	California (17)
2024	UCLA (13)
2025	UCLA (14)

=== Women's water polo ===
Year	Team
1996	UCLA
1997	UCLA
1998	UCLA
1999	California
2000	Stanford
2001	Stanford
2002	UCLA
2003	Stanford
2004	USC
2005	UCLA
2006	Stanford
2007	UCLA
2008	UCLA
2009	USC
2010	UCLA
2011	California
2012	UCLA
2013	USC
2014	Stanford
2015	UCLA
2016	USC
2017	UCLA
2018	USC
2019	USC
2020	N/A
2021	USC
2022	Stanford
2023	Stanford
2024	UCLA (12)
2025	Stanford (8)

== NCAA titles ==
The Mountain Pacific Sports Federation has won 100 NCAA titles in seven sports. UCLA has won 25 national titles. Stanford has won 20 titles. USC has won 16 titles. Oregon has won 12 titles. Oklahoma has won nine titles. California has won six titles. UC Irvine has won four titles. Arizona State and Brigham Young have won three titles. Pepperdine has won two titles. The MPSF has won every men's and women's water polo NCAA title since the inception of the conference.

=== Men's gymnastics ===
Year	Team
1992–93	Stanford
1994–95	Stanford
1996–97	California
1997–98	California
2001–02	Oklahoma
2002–03	Oklahoma
2004–05	Oklahoma
2005–06	Oklahoma
2007–08	Oklahoma
2008–09	Stanford
2010–11	Stanford
2014–15	Oklahoma
2015–16	Oklahoma
2016–17	Oklahoma
2017–18	Oklahoma
2018–19	Stanford
2020–21	Stanford
2021–22	Stanford
2022–23	Stanford

=== Men's volleyball ===
Year	Team
1993	UCLA
1995	UCLA
1996	UCLA
1997	Stanford
1998	UCLA
1999	BYU
2000	UCLA
2001	BYU
2004	BYU
2005	Pepperdine
2006	UCLA
2007	UC Irvine
2009	UC Irvine
2010	Stanford
2012	UC Irvine
2013	UC Irvine
2023	UCLA
2024	UCLA

=== Men's soccer ===
Year	Team
1998	UCLA

=== Men's Rowing ===
Year	Team
2024-25	Washington

=== Men's water polo ===
Year	Team
1992	California
1993	Stanford
1994	Stanford
1995	UCLA
1996	UCLA
1997	Pepperdine
1998	USC
1999	UCLA
2000	UCLA
2001	Stanford
2002	Stanford
2003	USC
2004	UCLA
2005	USC
2006	California
2007	California
2008	USC
2009	USC
2010	USC
2011	USC
2012	USC
2013	USC
2014	UCLA
2015	UCLA
2016	California
2017	UCLA
2018	USC
2019	Stanford
2020	UCLA
2021	California
2022	California
2023	California
2024	UCLA
2025	

=== Women's water polo ===
Year	Team
2001	UCLA
2002	Stanford
2003	UCLA
2004	USC
2005	UCLA
2006	UCLA
2007	UCLA
2008	UCLA
2009	UCLA (7)
2010	USC
2011	Stanford
2012	Stanford
2013	USC
2014	Stanford
2015	Stanford
2016	USC
2017	Stanford
2018	USC
2019	Stanford
2021	USC
2022	Stanford
2023	Stanford
2024	UCLA (8)
2025	Stanford (10)
