= 2022 Stanford Cardinal men's volleyball team =

American college volleyball season

2022 Stanford Cardinal men's volleyball
- Conference: Mountain Pacific Sports Federation
- Record: 14–14 (4–8 MPSF)
- Head coach: John Kosty (16th season)
- Assistant coaches: Ken Shibuya (16th season); Daniel Rasay (9th season)
- Home arena: Burnham Pavilion & Ford Center; Maples Pavilion

The 2022 Stanford Cardinal men's volleyball team represented Stanford University in the 2022 NCAA Division I & II men's volleyball season. The Cardinal, led by sixteenth year head coach John Kosty, played their home games split between Burnham Pavilion & Ford Center and Maples Pavilion. After being told that the 2021 season would be the Cardinal's final season of men's volleyball play, the program was saved when the university reversed their decision near the end of last years athletic calendar. The Cardinal are members of the MPSF and were picked to finish sixth in the MPSF preseason poll. Stanford finished fifth and pulled off two upsets in the MPSF Volleyball Tournament before falling to Pepperdine in the Championship.

2022 Mountain Pacific Sports Federation men's volleyball standings
	Conf.				Overall
Team	W		L	PCT	W		L	PCT
No. 4 UCLA ‍†‍‍^{y}	11	–	1	.917	22	–	5	.815
No. 7 USC ‍‍‍	8	–	4	.667	22	–	7	.759
No. 5 Pepperdine ‍‍‡‍^{y}	7	–	5	.583	19	–	10	.655
No. 11 Grand Canyon ‍‍‍	6	–	6	.500	16	–	12	.571
No. 9 Stanford ‍‍‍	4	–	8	.333	14	–	14	.500
Concordia Irvine ‍‍‍	3	–	9	.250	10	–	16	.385
BYU ‍‍‍	3	–	9	.250	8	–	17	.320
† – Conference champion ‡ – MPSF tournament champion y – Invited to the NCAA tournament Rankings from AVCA

== Season highlights ==
- Will be filled in as the season progresses.

== Roster ==
>2022 Stanford Cardinal roster
Defensive specialist/libero: 2 Justin Lui - (redshirt) Junior; 3 Matt Martinez - Sophomore; 5 Aaron Li - Junior; Middle blockers: 1 Adam Chang - Junior; 9 Ethan Hill - (redshirt) Sophomore; 16 Nathaniel Gates - Junior; 22 Gabriel Miranda - Junior	Outside hitters: 4 Aidan Peters - Sophomore; 6 Luke Turner - Sophomore; 10 Kevin Lamp - Junior; 15 Will Rottman - Junior; 11 Noah Keelin - Freshman; 15 Jack Deuchar - Sophomore	Opposite hitters: 24 Hunter Dickey - Senior; Setters: 11 Chris Kelly - Sophomore; 12 Nathan Lietzke - Junior

== Schedule ==
TV/Internet Streaming information:

All home games will be televised on Pac-12 Network or streamed on Pac-12+ Stanford's streaming page. Most road games will also be streamed by the schools streaming service. The conference tournament will be streamed by FloVolleyball.

Date time	Opponent	Rank^{(tournament seed)}	Arena city (tournament)	Television	Score	Attendance	Record (MPSF record)
1/5; 7 p.m.	Lindenwood		Burnham Pavilion & Ford Center; Stanford, CA	P12+ STAN	W 3–0 (25–16, 25–14, 25–18)	73	1–0
1/6; 7 p.m.	Lindenwood		Burnham Pavilion & Ford Center; Stanford, CA	P12+ STAN	W 3–0 (28–26, 25–16, 25–22)	70	2–0
1/8; 5 p.m.	#12 UC Irvine		Burnham Pavilion & Ford Center; Stanford, CA	P12+ STAN	W 3–2 (25–23, 25–21, 25–27, 22–25, 20–18)	82	3–0
1/14; 7 p.m.	@ #15 UC Irvine	#12	Bren Events Center; Irvine, CA	ESPN+	L 1–3 (23–25, 17–25, 25–23, 22–25)	514	3–1
1/15; 7 p.m.	@ #10 UC San Diego	#12	RIMAC; La Jolla, CA	ESPN+	L 0–3 (20–25, 22–25, 23–25)	0	3–2
1/21; 7 p.m.	Vanguard	#15	Burnham Pavilion & Ford Center; Stanford, CA	P12+ STAN	W 3–0 (24–26, 25–16, 18–25, 21–25)	101	4–2
1/22; 6 p.m.	UC Santa Cruz	#15	Burnham Pavilion & Ford Center; Stanford, CA	P12+ STAN	W 3–1 (25–11, 25–20, 23–25, 25–14)	86	5–2
2/4; 2:30 p.m.	vs. Fairleigh Dickinson	#14	Austin Convention Center; Austin, TX (First Point Men's Volleyball Collegiate Challenge)	Athletes Go Live	W 3–0 (25–20, 25–16, 25–16)	312	6–2
2/5; 7 p.m.	vs. #1 Hawai'i	#14	Austin Convention Center; Austin, TX (First Point Men's Volleyball Collegiate Challenge)	Athletes Go Live	L 1–3 (25–19, 13–25, 19–25, 20–25)	1,875	6–3
2/11; 7 p.m.	Menlo	#14	Burnham Pavilion & Ford Center; Stanford, CA	P12+ STAN	W 3–0 (28–26, 25–16, 25–20)	412	7–3
2/18; 7 p.m.	CSUN	#13	Maples Pavilion; Stanford, CA	P12 BAY	W 3–0 (25–17, 25–13, 26–24)	179	8–3
2/25; 7 p.m.	@ #2 Long Beach State	#12	Walter Pyramid; Long Beach, CA	ESPN+	L 0–3 (19–25, 22–25, 18–25)	1,491	8–4
2/26; 7 p.m.	@ CSUN	#12	Matadome; Northridge, CA	ESPN+	L 1–3 (15–25, 27–25, 20–25, 24–26)	225	8–5
3/4; 7 p.m.	@ Concordia Irvine*	#14	CU Arena; Irvine, CA	EagleEye	L 2–3 (20–25, 21–25, 25–18, 25–21, 13–15)	77	8–6 (0–1)
3/5; 7 p.m.	@ Concordia Irvine*	#14	CU Arena; Irvine, CA	EagleEye	L 1–3 (22–25, 25–22, 25–27, 20–25)	81	8–7 (0–2)
3/11; 7 p.m.	#1 UCLA*		Maples Pavilion; Stanford, CA	P12+ STAN	W 3–2 (25–20, 22–25, 25–18, 23–25, 15–12)	580	9–7 (1–2)
3/12; 6 p.m.	#1 UCLA*		Maples Pavilion; Stanford, CA	P12	L 1–3 (25–20, 13–25, 23–25, 25–27)	963	9–8 (1–3)
3/25; 7 p.m.	#5 USC*	#14	Maples Pavilion; Stanford, CA	P12	W 3–1 (25–19, 20–25, 25–16, 28–26)	376	10–8 (2–3)
3/26; 6 p.m.	#5 USC*	#14	Maples Pavilion; Stanford, CA	P12	L 1–3 (25–23, 17–25, 22–25, 21–25)	450	10–9 (2–4)
3/31; 6 p.m.	@ #10 Grand Canyon*	#12	GCU Arena; Phoenix, AZ	ESPN+	L 0–3 (21–25, 20–25, 15–25)	682	10–10 (2–5)
4/2; 4 p.m.	@ #10 Grand Canyon*	#12	GCU Arena; Phoenix, AZ	ESPN+	L 1–3 (20–25, 25–21, 20–25, 25–27)	621	10–11 (2–6)
4/8; 7 p.m.	BYU*	#12	Maples Pavilion; Stanford, CA	P12 BAY	W 3–0 (29–27, 25–20, 25–22)	630	11–11 (3–6)
4/9; 6 p.m.	BYU*	#12	Maples Pavilion; Stanford, CA	P12 BAY	W 3–2 (19–25, 25–27, 25–23, 25–20, 24–22)	1,142	12–11 (4–6)
4/14; 6 p.m.	@ #8 Pepperdine*	#12	Firestone Fieldhouse; Malibu, CA	WaveCasts	L 0–3 (18–25, 10–25, 19–25)	515	12–12 (4–7)
4/16; 6 p.m.	@ #8 Pepperdine*	#12	Firestone Fieldhouse; Malibu, CA	WaveCasts	L 2–3 (21–25, 21–25, 25–13, 25–23, 11–15)	535	12–13 (4–8)
4/20; 8 p.m.	vs. #10 Grand Canyon^{(4)}	#13^{(5)}	Pauley Pavilion; Los Angeles, CA (MPSF Quarterfinal)	FloVolleyball	W 3–1 (25–21, 25–20, 22–25, 25–22)	500	13–13
4/21; 4 p.m.	vs. #1 UCLA^{(1)}	#13^{(5)}	Pauley Pavilion; Los Angeles, CA (MPSF Semifinal)	FloVolleyball	W 3–2 (25–21, 25–23, 21–25, 15–25, 15–11)	850	14–13
4/23; 6 p.m.	vs. #8 Pepperdine^{(2)}	#13^{(5)}	Pauley Pavilion; Los Angeles, CA (MPSF Championship)	FloVolleyball	L 2–3 (20–25, 19–25, 25–22, 25–22, 12–15)	1,163	14–14

*-Indicates conference match.
Times listed are Pacific Time Zone.

== Announcers for televised games ==
- Lindenwood: Tim Swartz
- Lindenwood: Tim Swartz & Jordan Watkins
- UC Irvine: Tim Swartz
- UC Irvine: Rob Espero & Charlie Brande
- UC San Diego: Bryan Fenley & Ricci Luyties
- Vanguard: Tim Swartz & Troy Clardy
- UC Santa Cruz: Tim Swartz & Troy Clardy
- Fairleigh Dickinson: Kanoa Leahey & Bill Walton
- Hawai'i: Kanoa Leahey & Bill Walton
- Menlo: Troy Clardy & Ted Enberg
- CSUN: Troy Clardy
- Long Beach State: Matt Brown & Matt Prosser
- CSUN: Darren Preston
- Concordia Irvine: Patience O'Neal
- Concordia Irvine: Patience O'Neal
- UCLA: Tim Swartz & Ted Enberg
- UCLA: Ted Enberg
- USC: Ted Enberg
- USC: Ted Enberg
- Grand Canyon: Diana Johnson & Houston Boe
- Grand Canyon: Diana Johnson & Houston Boe
- BYU: Ted Enberg
- BYU: Ted Enberg
- Pepperdine: Al Epstein
- Pepperdine: Al Epstein
- MPSF Quarterfinal- Grand Canyon: Nick Koop
- MPSF Semifinal- UCLA: Darren Preston
- MPSF Championship- Pepperdine: Darren Preston

== Rankings ==
Ranking movements Legend: ██ Increase in ranking ██ Decrease in ranking — = Not ranked RV = Received votes
	Week																	
Poll	Pre	1	2	3	4	5	6	7	8	9	10	11	12	13	14	15	16	Final
AVCA Coaches	RV	12	15	13	14	14	13	12	14	RV	14	14	12	12	12	13		
Off the Block Media	Not released	10	RV	RV	—	—	RV	RV										

^The Media did not release a Pre-season poll.
