= 2022 Grand Canyon Antelopes men's volleyball team =

American college volleyball season

2022 Grand Canyon Antelopes men's volleyball
- Conference: Mountain Pacific Sports Federation
- Record: 16–12 (6–6 MPSF)
- Head coach: Matt Werle (7th season)
- Assistant coach: Keith Smith (4th season)
- Home arena: GCU Arena

The 2022 Grand Canyon Antelopes men's volleyball team represented Grand Canyon University in the 2022 NCAA Division I & II men's volleyball season. The 'Lopes, led by seventh year head coach Matt Werle, played their home games at GCU Arena. The 'Lopes were members of the MPSF and were picked to finish fourth in the MPSF preseason poll. The Lopes finished fourth in the MPSF but fell in the 1st Round of the MPSF Tournament to Stanford.

2022 Mountain Pacific Sports Federation men's volleyball standings
	Conf.				Overall
Team	W		L	PCT	W		L	PCT
No. 4 UCLA ‍†‍‍^{y}	11	–	1	.917	22	–	5	.815
No. 7 USC ‍‍‍	8	–	4	.667	22	–	7	.759
No. 5 Pepperdine ‍‍‡‍^{y}	7	–	5	.583	19	–	10	.655
No. 11 Grand Canyon ‍‍‍	6	–	6	.500	16	–	12	.571
No. 9 Stanford ‍‍‍	4	–	8	.333	14	–	14	.500
Concordia Irvine ‍‍‍	3	–	9	.250	10	–	16	.385
BYU ‍‍‍	3	–	9	.250	8	–	17	.320
† – Conference champion ‡ – MPSF tournament champion y – Invited to the NCAA tournament Rankings from AVCA

== Season highlights ==
- Will be filled in as the season progresses.

== Roster ==
2022 Grand Canyon roster
Defensive specialist/libero: 13 Cole Udall - (redshirt) Junior; 15 Cooper Herndon - (redshirt) Freshman; Middle blockers: 3 Chibuike Obi - (redshirt) Sophomore; 9 Troy Culp - Junior; 10 Isaiah Harris - Freshman; 14 Jacob Guerber - (redshirt) Sophomore; 18 Matthew Meeker-Hackett - Freshman; 21 Colin Lovejoy - Sophomore; 24 Nicholas Bentlage - Freshman	Outside hitters: 1 Camden Gianni - (redshirt) Sophomore; 2 Karter Rogers - (redshirt) Freshman; 5 Chase Gianni - Freshman; 11 Christian Janke - (redshirt) Junior; 12 Grayson Browning - (redshirt) Junior; 16 Jackson Hickman - (redshirt) Sophomore	Opposite hitters: 19 Hugo Fischer - (redshirt) Junior; 20 Carson Brandt - (redshirt) Sophomore; 25 Jonah Gilbert - freshman; Setters: 4 Aidan Case- Freshman; 7 Nicholas Slight - (redshirt) Freshman; 8 Heath Hughes - (redshirt) Junior

== Schedule ==
TV/Internet Streaming information:

All home games will be streamed on ESPN+. Most road games will also be streamed by the schools streaming service. The conference tournament will be streamed by FloVolleyball.

Date time	Opponent	Rank^{(tournament seed)}	Arena city (tournament)	Television	Score	Attendance	Record (MPSF record)
1/7; 6 p.m.	#14 McKendree	#8	GCU Arena; Phoenix, AZ	ESPN+	W 3–1 (21–25, 30–28, 25–19, 31–29)	1,128	1–0
1/8; 7 p.m.	#14 McKendree	#8	GCU Arena; Phoenix, AZ	ESPN+	W 3–1 (25–19, 25–22, 22–25, 25–14)	912	2–0
1/13; 5 p.m.	@ #4 Penn State	#6	Rec Hall; University Park, PA	B1G+	L 0–3 (17–25, 21–25, 22–25)	437	2–1
1/15; 5 p.m.	@ #4 Penn State	#6	Rec Hall; University Park, PA	B1G+	L 0–3 (18–25, 18–25, 13–25)	486	2–2
1/21; 8 p.m.	@ #8 UC San Diego	#6	RIMAC Arena; La Jolla, CA	ESPN+	W 3–1 (25–21, 25–19, 24–26, 25–20)	0	3–2
1/27; 7 p.m.	Benedictine	#6	GCU Arena; Phoenix, AZ	ESPN+	W 3–0 (25–16, 25–10, 25–21)	678	4–2
1/28; 7 p.m.	Master's	#6	GCU Arena; Phoenix, AZ	ESPN+	W 3–0 (25–18, 25–20, 25–23)	315	5–2
2/04; 6 p.m.	@ Loyola Chicago	#8	Joseph J. Gentile Arena; Chicago, IL	ESPN+	W 3–0 (25–17, 25–19, 24–26)	473	6–2
2/05; 6 p.m.	@ #6 Lewis	#8	Neil Carey Arena; Romeoville, IL	GLVC SN	L 2–3 (24–26, 25–19, 23–25, 25–20, 10–15)	419	6–3
2/11; 6 p.m.	#8 UC Santa Barbara	#9	GCU Arena; Phoenix, AZ	ESPN+	L 2–3 (25–22, 23–25, 21–25, 25–14, 18–20)	692	6–4
2/12; 7 p.m.	#8 UC Santa Barbara	#9	GCU Arena; Phoenix, AZ	ESPN+	L 2–3 (25–21, 12–25, 23–25, 25–20, 12–15)	604	6–5
2/18; 6 p.m.	#8 Pepperdine*	#10	GCU Arena; Phoenix, AZ	ESPN+	L 1–3 (42–40, 18–25, 19–25, 20–25)	635	6–6 (0–1)
2/20; 2 p.m.	#8 Pepperdine*	#10	GCU Arena; Phoenix, AZ	ESPN+	W 3–1 (25–21, 26–24, 19–25, 25–13)	521	7–6 (1–1)
2/25; 7 p.m.	@ #13 BYU*	#9	Smith Fieldhouse; Provo, UT	BYUtv	W 3–1 (21–25, 25–19, 25–19, 25–22)	3,149	8–6 (2–1)
2/26; 7 p.m.	@ #13 BYU*	#9	Smith Fieldhouse; Provo, UT	BYUtv	W 3–2 (24–26, 28–30, 25–22, 28–26, 18–16)	2,753	9–6 (3–1)
3/03; 8 p.m.	@ #1 UCLA*	#8	Pauley Pavilion; Los Angeles, CA	P12+	L 0–3 (14–25, 19–25, 21–25)	1,114	9–7 (3–2)
3/04; 8 p.m.	@ #1 UCLA*	#8	Pauley Pavilion; Los Angeles, CA	P12+	L 0–3 (18–25, 20–25, 21–25)	966	9–8 (3–3)
3/12; 6 p.m.	Harvard	#9	GCU Arena; Phoenix, AZ	ESPN+	W 3–0 (25–20, 25–14, 25–22)	428	10–8
3/13; 4 p.m.	Harvard	#9	GCU Arena; Phoenix, AZ	ESPN+	W 3–0 (25–22, 25–16, 25–22)	278	11–8
3/18; 6 p.m.	Tusculm	#9	GCU Arena; Phoenix, AZ	ESPN+	W 3–0 (25–19, 25–19, 25–15)	262	12–8
3/19; 4 p.m.	Tusculum	#9	GCU Arena; Phoenix, AZ	ESPN+	W 3–0 (25–16, 25–15, 25–17"	251	13–8
3/25; 7 p.m.	@ Concordia Irvine*	#9	CU Arena; Irvine, CA	EagleEye	L 0–3 (21–25, 34–36, 23–25)	155	13–9 (3–4)
3/26; 7 p.m.	@ Concordia Irvine*	#9	CU Arena; Irvine, CA	EagleEye	W 3–1 (18–25, 25–20, 25–23, 25–21)	230	14–9 (4–4)
3/31; 7 p.m.	#12 Stanford*	#10	GCU Arena; Phoenix, AZ	ESPN+	W 3–0 (25–21, 25–20, 25–15)	682	15–9 (5–4)
4/02; 6 p.m.	#12 Stanford*	#10	GCU Arena; Phoenix, AZ	ESPN+	W 3–1 (25–20, 21–25, 25–20, 27–25)	621	16–9 (6–4)
4/15; 6 p.m.	#5 USC*	#10	GCU Arena; Phoenix, AZ	ESPN+	L 2–3 (25–21, 25–15, 14–25, 23–25,12–15)	928	16–10 (6–5)
4/16; 6 p.m.	#5 USC	#10	GCU Arena; Phoenix, AZ	ESPN+	L 0–3 (22–25, 22–25, 25–27)	703	16–11 (6–6)
4/20; 8 p.m.	vs. #13 Stanford^{(4)}	#10^{(5)}	Pauley Pavilion; Los Angeles, CA (MPSF Quarterfinal)	FloVolleyball	L 1–3 (21–25, 20–25, 25–22, 22–25)	500	16–12

*-Indicates conference match. ^{(#)}-Indicates tournament seeding.
Times listed are Time in Arizona.

== Announcers for televised games ==
- McKendree: Diana Johnson & Houston Boe
- McKendree: Diana Johnson & Houston Boe
- Penn State: Connor Griffin & Alex Rocco
- Penn State: Zech Lambert & Alex Rocco
- UC San Diego: Bryan Fenley & Ricci Luyties
- Benedictine: Diana Johnson & Houston Boe
- Master's: Diana Johnson & Braden Dohrmann
- Loyola Chicago: Ray Gooden & Kris Berzins
- Lewis: Cody Lindeman, Bella Ray, & Andrea Zeiser
- UC Santa Barbara: Houston Boe & Diana Johnson
- UC Santa Barbara: Diana Johnson & Amanda Roach
- Pepperdine: Diana Johnson & Houston Boe
- Pepperdine: Diana Johnson & Amanda Roach
- BYU: Jarom Jordan, Steve Vail & Kiki Solano
- BYU: Jarom Jordan, Steve Vail, & Kiki Solano
- UCLA: Denny Cline
- UCLA: Denny Cline
- Harvard: Diana Johnson & Amanda Roach
- Harvard: Diana Johnson & Houston Boe
- Tusculum: Diana Johnson & Houston Boe
- Tusculum: Diana Johnson & Amanda Roach
- Concordia Irvine: Ben Rose & Ron J. Ruhman
- Concordia Irvine: Patience O'Neal
- Stanford: Diana Johnson & Houston Boe
- Stanford: Diana Johnson & Houston Boe
- USC: Diana Johnson & Amanda Roach
- USC: Diana Johnson & Houston Boe
- MPSF Tournament Quarterfinal- Stanford: Nick Koop

== Rankings ==
Ranking movements Legend: ██ Increase in ranking ██ Decrease in ranking RV = Received votes
	Week																	
Poll	Pre	1	2	3	4	5	6	7	8	9	10	11	12	13	14	15	16	Final
AVCA Coaches	8	6	6	6	8	9	10	9	8	9	9	9	10	9	10	10		
Off the Block Media	Not released	6	7	6	10	10	RV	RV										

^The Media did not release a Pre-season poll.
