= 2022 Mountain Pacific Sports Federation men's volleyball tournament =

Volleyball Tournament

2022 Mountain Pacific Sports Federation Men's Volleyball Tournament
- Classification: Division I/II
- Teams: 7
- Site: Pauley Pavilion; Los Angeles
- Champions: Pepperdine (6th title)
- Winning coach: David Hunt (2nd title)
- MVP: Bryce Dvorak (Pepperdine)
- Television: FloVolleyball
- Mountain Pacific Sports Federation Men's Volleyball Tournaments

2022 Mountain Pacific Sports Federation volleyball standings
	Conf.				Overall
Team	W		L	PCT	W		L	PCT
No. 4 UCLA ‍†‍‍^{y}	11	–	1	.917	22	–	5	.815
No. 7 USC ‍‍‍	8	–	4	.667	22	–	7	.759
No. 5 Pepperdine ‍‍‡‍^{y}	7	–	5	.583	19	–	10	.655
No. 11 Grand Canyon ‍‍‍	6	–	6	.500	16	–	12	.571
No. 9 Stanford ‍‍‍	4	–	8	.333	14	–	14	.500
Concordia Irvine ‍‍‍	3	–	9	.250	10	–	16	.385
BYU ‍‍‍	3	–	9	.250	8	–	17	.320
† – Conference champion ‡ – 2022 MPSF Tournament champion y- Invited to the NCAA Volleyball Tournament; Rankings from AVCA

The 2022 Mountain Pacific Sports Federation Volleyball Tournament was a postseason men's volleyball tournament for the Mountain Pacific Sports Federation during the 2022 NCAA Division I & II men's volleyball season. It was held April 20 through April 23, 2022 at the #1 seed's home arena, Pauley Pavilion on the campus of UCLA. All games were streamed live on FloVolleyball.

The winner received The Federation's automatic bid to the 2022 NCAA Volleyball Tournament, to be held at Pauley Pavilion.

== Seeds ==
All seven teams are eligible for the postseason, with the #1 seed receiving a bye to the semifinals. Teams are seeded by record within the conference, with a tiebreaker system to seed teams with identical conference records. The #1 seed will play the lowest remaining seed in the semifinals.

Should a team be unable to play a match due to COVID-19, it will count as a loss in the conference standings, and it will be used to determine MPSF Tournament seeding.

Seed	School	Conference	Tiebreaker
1	UCLA	11–1	–
2	USC	8–4	–
3	Pepperdine	7–5	–
4	Grand Canyon	6–6	–
5	Stanford	4–8	–
6	BYU	3–9	2–0 vs. Concordia
7	Concordia Irvine	3–9	0–2 vs. BYU

== Schedule and results ==
Time Network	Matchup	Score	Attendance	Broadcasters
Quarterfinals – Wednesday, April 20
2 p.m. FloVolleyball	No. 2 USC vs. No. 7 Concordia Irvine	3–0 (25–19, 25–22, 25–19)	N/A	Nick Koop
5 p.m. FloVolleyball	No. 3 Pepperdine vs. No. 6 BYU	3–2 (25—22, 25–20, 23–25, 21–25, 16–14)	450	Nick Koop
8 p.m. FloVolleyball	No. 4 Grand Canyon vs. No. 5 Stanford	1–3 (21–25, 20–25, 25–22, 22–25)	500	Nick Koop
Semifinals – Thursday, April 21
4 p.m. FloVolleyball	No. 1 UCLA vs. No. 5 Stanford	2–3 (21–25, 23–25, 25–21, 25–15, 11–15)	850	Darren Preston
7 p.m. FloVolleyball	No. 2 USC vs. No. 3 Pepperdine	1–3 (23–25, 26–28, 25–20, 25–27)	850	Darren Preston
Championship – Saturday, April 23
6 p.m. FloVolleyball	No. 3 Pepperdine vs. No. 5 Stanford	3–2 (25–20, 25–19, 22–25, 22–25, 15–12)	1,163	Darren Preston
Game times are PT. Rankings denote tournament seeding.

== Bracket ==
Quarterfinals; Wednesday, April 20
1	UCLA
(bye)
4	Grand Canyon	1
5	Stanford	3
(Pairings are reseeded after the first round)
2	USC	3
7	Concordia Irvine	0
3	Pepperdine	3
6	BYU	2

Semifinals; Thursday, April 21
1	UCLA	2
5	Stanford	3
2	USC	1
3	Pepperdine	3

Championship; Saturday, April 23
5	Stanford	2
3	Pepperdine	3

== Game summaries ==
All times are Pacific.

=== Quarterfinals ===
April 20, 2022; 2:00 p.m. PDT	^{(2)} USC	3–1	^{(7)} Concordia Irvine	Pauley Pavilion — Los Angeles, CA; Referees: Ron Pelham, Robert Okamura
April 20, 2022; 2:00 p.m. PDT	(25—19, 25–22, 25–19); Recap			Pauley Pavilion — Los Angeles, CA; Referees: Ron Pelham, Robert Okamura

April 20, 2022; 5:00 p.m. PDT	^{(3)} Pepperdine	3–2	^{(6)} BYU	Pauley Pavilion — Los Angeles, CA; Attendance: 450; Referees: Bill Forrester, Ron Pelham
April 20, 2022; 5:00 p.m. PDT	(25—22, 25–20, 23–25, 21–25, 16–14); Recap			Pauley Pavilion — Los Angeles, CA; Attendance: 450; Referees: Bill Forrester, Ron Pelham

April 20, 2022; 8:00 p.m. PDT	^{(4)} Grand Canyon	1–3	^{(5)} Stanford	Pauley Pavilion — Los Angeles, CA; Attendance: 500; Referees: Robert Okamura, Bin Forrester
April 20, 2022; 8:00 p.m. PDT	(25–21, 25–20, 22–25, 25–22); Recap			Pauley Pavilion — Los Angeles, CA; Attendance: 500; Referees: Robert Okamura, Bin Forrester

=== Semifinals ===
April 21, 2022; 4:00 p.m. PDT	^{(1)} UCLA	2–3	^{(5)} Stanford	Pauley Pavilion — Los Angeles, CA; Attendance: 850; Referees: Bill Forrester, Ron Pelham
April 21, 2022; 4:00 p.m. PDT	(21–25, 23–25, 25–21, 25–15, 11–15); Recap			Pauley Pavilion — Los Angeles, CA; Attendance: 850; Referees: Bill Forrester, Ron Pelham

April 21, 2022; 7:00 p.m. PDT	^{(2)} USC	1–3	^{(3)} Pepperdine	Pauley Pavilion — Los Angeles, CA; Attendance: 850; Referees: Ron Pelham, Robert Okamura
April 21, 2022; 7:00 p.m. PDT	(23–25, 26–28, 25–20, 25–27); Recap			Pauley Pavilion — Los Angeles, CA; Attendance: 850; Referees: Ron Pelham, Robert Okamura

=== MPSF Championship ===
April 23, 2022; 6:00 p.m. PDT	^{(3)} Pepperdine	3–2	^{(5)} Stanford	Pauley Pavilion — Los Angeles, CA; Attendance: 1,163; Referees: Ron Pelham, Bill Forester
April 23, 2022; 6:00 p.m. PDT	(25–20, 25–19, 22–25, 22–25, 15–12)			Pauley Pavilion — Los Angeles, CA; Attendance: 1,163; Referees: Ron Pelham, Bill Forester

== All-Tournament Team ==
- Bryce Dvorak (MVP), Pepperdine
- Jacob Steele, Pepperdine
- Alex Gettinger, Pepperdine
- Justin Lui, Stanford
- Will Rottman, Stanford
- Sam Kobrine, USC
- Kevin Kobrine, UCLA
