= 2022 UCLA Bruins men's volleyball team =

American college volleyball season

2022 UCLA Bruins men's volleyball

MPSF Regular Season Champions

NCAA Tournament, 3rd Place
- Conference: Mountain Pacific Sports Federation
- Record: 22-5 (11–1 MPSF)
- Head coach: John Speraw (10th season)
- Assistant coaches: John Hawks (7th season); Spencer McLachlin (4th season)
- Home arena: Pauley Pavilion; John Wooden Center

The 2022 UCLA men's volleyball team represented University of California, Los Angeles in the 2022 NCAA Division I & II men's volleyball season. The Bruins, led by tenth year head coach John Speraw, played their home games at Pauley Pavilion when basketball did not conflict with the home game schedule and at John Wooden Center when basketball conflicted with the home game schedule. The Bruins were members of the MPSF and were picked to finish second in the MPSF preseason poll. UCLA hosted the MPSF tournament (April 20–23) and also the 2022 NCAA Championship at Pauley Pavilion. The 2022 NCAA Championship began on May 1 with an opening round match.

2022 Mountain Pacific Sports Federation men's volleyball standings
	Conf.				Overall
Team	W		L	PCT	W		L	PCT
No. 4 UCLA ‍†‍‍^{y}	11	–	1	.917	22	–	5	.815
No. 7 USC ‍‍‍	8	–	4	.667	22	–	7	.759
No. 5 Pepperdine ‍‍‡‍^{y}	7	–	5	.583	19	–	10	.655
No. 11 Grand Canyon ‍‍‍	6	–	6	.500	16	–	12	.571
No. 9 Stanford ‍‍‍	4	–	8	.333	14	–	14	.500
Concordia Irvine ‍‍‍	3	–	9	.250	10	–	16	.385
BYU ‍‍‍	3	–	9	.250	8	–	17	.320
† – Conference champion ‡ – MPSF tournament champion y – Invited to the NCAA tournament Rankings from AVCA

== Season highlights ==
- The Bruins defeated rivals USC Trojans twice this season.
- UCLA won the MPSF title by defeating Pepperdine 3–0 on April 9, 2022.
- The team hosted the MPSF and NCAA Tournaments at Pauley Pavilion.

== Roster ==
2022 UCLA Bruins roster
Defensive specialist/libero: 4 Cole Pender - (redshirt) Senior; 14 Matthew Aziz - Freshman; Middle blockers: 2 J.R. Norris IV - (redshirt) Senior; 7 Ian Parish - (redshirt) Sophomore; 9 Guy Genis - (redshirt) Freshman; 10 Sean McQuiggan - Freshman; 13 Merrick McHenry - (redshirt) Sophomore; 15 Daniel Matheney - (redshirt) Junior; 22 Matthew Edwards - Freshman	Outside hitters: 3 Cole Ketrzynski - Junior; 11 Cooper Robinson - Freshman; 12 Alex Knight - Junior; 16 Ido David - Freshman; 17 Sam Burgi - (redshirt) Junior; 18 Grant Sloane - (redshirt) Freshman; 19 Ian Eschenberg - Senior; 20 Ethan Champlin - Sophomore	Opposite hitters: 1 Kyle Vom Steeg - (redshirt) Sophomore; 3 Cole Ketrzynski - Junior; 8 Kevin Kobrine - (redshirt) Junior; 16 Ido David - Freshman; 24 Miles Partain - Sophomore; Setters: 5 Ayrton Garcia-Jurado - Junior; 6 Marcus Partain - (redshirt) Sophomore; 24 Miles Partain - Sophomore

== Schedule ==
TV/Internet Streaming information:

All home games will be televised on Pac-12 Network or Pac-12+. Most road games will also be streamed by the schools streaming service. The conference tournament will be streamed by FloVolleyball.

Date time	Opponent	Rank^{(tournament seed)}	Arena city (tournament)	Television	Score	Attendance	Record (MPSF record)
1/15; 5 p.m.	Princeton	#2	John Wooden Center; Los Angeles, CA	P12+ UCLA	W 3–0 (25–12, 25–22, 25–22)	0	1–0
1/21; 5 p.m.	#11 Ohio State	#2	Pauley Pavilion; Los Angeles, CA (Big 10/Pac 12 Challenge)	P12, P12 LA	W 3–2 (25–18, 25–15, 23–25, 23–25, 15–8)	0	2–0
1/22; 7:30 p.m.	#3 Penn State	#2	Pauley Pavilion; Los Angeles, CA (Big 10/Pac 12 Challenge)	P12 Insider	W 3–1 (17–25, 28–26, 25–22, 25–19)	1,047	3–0
1/27; 7 p.m.	CSUN	#2	John Wooden Center; Los Angeles, CA	P12+ UCLA	W 3–0 (27–25, 25–18, 25–22)	450	4–0
1/29; 5 p.m.	#7 Lewis	#2	John Wooden Center; Los Angeles, CA	P12+ UCLA	L 0–3 (21–25, 20–25, 23–25)	750	4–1
2/4; 7 p.m.	@ #15 UC Irvine	#4	Bren Events Center; Irvine, CA	ESPN+	W 3–1 (21–25, 25–14, 25–22, 26–24)	1,248	5–1
2/5; 7 p.m.	#15 UC Irvine	#4	Pauley Pavilion; Los Angeles, CA	P12 LA	W 3–2 (25–23, 23–25, 25–14, 16–25, 15–11)	1,228	6–1
2/9; 7 p.m.	@ #14 UC San Diego	#2	RIMAC Arena; La Jolla, CA	ESPN+	W 3–1 (22–25, 25–18, 25–23, 25–16)	1,505	7–1
2/11; 7 p.m.	@ #1 Long Beach State	#2	Walter Pyramid; Long Beach, CA	ESPN+	L 0–3 (22–25, 23–25, 13–25)	3,137	7–2
2/19; 5 p.m.	#1 Long Beach State	#2	John Wooden Center; Los Angeles, CA	P12+ UCLA	W 3–2 (25–20, 25–23, 23–25, 21–25, 15–12)	2,008	8–2
2/23; 7 p.m.	Concordia Irvine*	#1	Pauley Pavilion; Los Angeles, CA	P12+ UCLA	W 3–1 (25–21, 25–16, 20–25, 25–18)	728	9–2 (1–0)
2/25; 7 p.m.	@ Concordia Irvine*	#1	CU Arena; Irvine, CA	EagleEye	W 3–0 (25–13, 25–20, 25–15)	111	10–2 (2–0)
3/3; 7 p.m.	#8 Grand Canyon*	#1	Pauley Pavilion; Los Angeles, CA	P12+ UCLA	W 3–0 (25–14, 25–19, 25–21)	1,114	11–2 (3–0)
3/4; 5 p.m.	#8 Grand Canyon*	#1	Pauley Pavilion; Los Angeles, CA	P12+ UCLA	W 3–0 (25–18, 25–20, 25–21)	966	12–2 (4–0)
3/11; 7 p.m.	@ Stanford*	#1	Maples Pavilion; Stanford, CA	P12+ STAN	L 2–3 (20–25, 25–22, 18–25, 25–23, 12–15)	580	12–3 (4–1)
3/12; 6 p.m.	@ Stanford*	#1	Maples Pavilion; Stanford, CA	P12	W 3–1 (20–25, 25–13, 25–23, 27–25)	963	13–3 (5–1)
3/25; 3 p.m.	@ Morehouse	#1	Forbes Arena; Atlanta, GA		W 3–0 (25–8, 25–9, 25–5)	225	14–3 (5–1)
3/26; 3 p.m.	@ Fort Valley State	#1	HPE Arena; Fort Valley, GA		W 3–0 (25–8, 25–10, 25–11)	101	15–3 (5–1)
3/31; 7 p.m.	@ #5 USC*	#1	Galen Center; Los Angeles, CA	P12 LA	W 3–0 (25–23, 25–19, 25–17)	975	16–3 (6–1)
4/2; 5 p.m.	#5 USC*	#1	Pauley Pavilion; Los Angeles, CA	P12 LA	W 3–2 (23–25, 25–19, 17–25, 25–12, 15–12)	4,032	17–3 (7–1)
4/7; 7 p.m.	@ #8 Pepperdine*	#1	Firestone Fieldhouse; Malibu, CA	WaveCasts	W 3–0 (25–19, 30–28, 25–22)	941	18–3 (8–1)
4/9; 6 p.m.	#8 Pepperdine*	#1	Pauley Pavilion; Los Angeles, CA	P12 LA	W 3–0 (25-23, 25-19, 25-19)	2,942	19–3 (9–3)
4/15; 6 p.m.	@ BYU*	#1	Smith Fieldhouse; Provo, UT	BYUtv	W 3–1 (20–25, 25–23, 25–16, 25–18)	3,987	20–3; 10–3
4/16; 6 p.m.	@ BYU*	#1	Smith Fieldhouse; Provo, UT	BYUtv	W 3–2 (26–28, 20–25, 25–23, 25–22, 15–9)	4,185	21–3; 11–3
4/21; 4 p.m.	^{(5)} Stanford	#1^{(1)}	Pauley Pavilion; Los Angeles, CA (MPSF Semifinal)	FloVolleyball	L 2–3 (21–25, 23–25, 25–21, 25–15, 11–15)	850	21–4
5/3; 5 p.m.	Pepperdine	#1	Pauley Pavilion; Los Angeles, CA (NCAA Opening Round)	P12	W 3–1 (25–23, 22–25, 26–24, 25–19)	1,814	22–4
5/5; 5 p.m.	Long Beach State	#1	Pauley Pavilion; Los Angeles, CA (NCAA Semifinal)	NCAA.com	L 2–3 (25–18, 25–18, 15–25, 10–25, 14–16)	4,430	22–5

*-Indicates conference match. (#)-Indicates tournament seeding.
Times listed are Pacific Time Zone. Rank – American Volleyball Coaches Association (AVCA) Men's Division I-II Coaches Poll. (#) Tournament seedings in parentheses.

== Announcers for televised games ==
- Princeton: Denny Cline
- Ohio State: Anne Marie Anderson
- Penn State: Denny Cline
- CSUN: Denny Cline
- Lewis: Denny Cline
- UC Irvine: Rob Espero & Charlie Brande
- UC Irvine: Denny Cline
- UC San Diego: Bryan Fenley & Ricci Luyties
- Long Beach State: Matt Brown & Matt Prosser
- Long Beach State: Denny Cline
- Concordia Irvine: Denny Cline
- Concordia Irvine: Patience O'Neal
- Grand Canyon: Denny Cline
- Grand Canyon: Denny Cline
- Stanford: Tim Swartz & Ted Enberg
- Stanford: Ted Enberg
- USC: Anne Marie Anderson
- USC: Anne Marie Anderson
- Pepperdine: Al Epstein
- Pepperdine: Jim Watson
- BYU: Jarom Jordan, Steve Vail & Kiki Solano
- BYU: Jarom Jordan, Steve Vail, & Kiki Solano
- MPSF Tournament Semifinal- Stanford: Darren Preston
- NCAA Opening Round- Pepperdine: Darren Preston
- NCAA Semifinal: Brendan Gulick

== Rankings ==
Ranking movements Legend: ██ Increase in ranking ██ Decrease in ranking т = Tied with team above or below
	Week																	
Poll	Pre	1	2	3	4	5	6	7	8	9	10	11	12	13	14	15	16	Final
AVCA Coaches	2	2	2	4	2	2	2	1	1	1	1	1	1	1	1	1		
Off the Block Media	Not released	2	3	2	4	2	3	2	2	2	2т	2т	2т	2	1			

== Awards and honors ==
- March 14, 2022 – Merrick McHenry was the Co-National Middle Attacker of the Week by offtheblock.com and Kevin Kobrine was named the MPSF Defensive Player of the Week
- April 4, 2022 – Miles Partain was named National Setter of the Week and Kevin Kobrine was the MPSF Offensive Player of the Week
- April 11, 2022 – Miles Partain was named MPSF Player of the Week
- April 18, 2022 – Ido David was named MPSF Offensive Player of the Week
