= 2022 USC Trojans men's volleyball team =

American college volleyball season

2022 USC Trojans men's volleyball
- Conference: Mountain Pacific Sports Federation
- Record: 22–7 (8–4 MPSF)
- Head coach: Jeff Nygaard (7th season)
- Assistant coaches: Gary Sato (7th season); Rory Prager (3rd season)
- Home arena: Galen Center

The 2022 USC Trojans men's volleyball team represented the University of Southern California in the 2022 NCAA Division I & II men's volleyball season. The Trojans, led by seventh year head coach Jeff Nygaard, played their home games at Galen Center. The Trojans were members of the MPSF and were picked to finish fifth in the MPSF preseason poll.

2022 Mountain Pacific Sports Federation men's volleyball standings
	Conf.				Overall
Team	W		L	PCT	W		L	PCT
No. 4 UCLA ‍†‍‍^{y}	11	–	1	.917	22	–	5	.815
No. 7 USC ‍‍‍	8	–	4	.667	22	–	7	.759
No. 5 Pepperdine ‍‍‡‍^{y}	7	–	5	.583	19	–	10	.655
No. 11 Grand Canyon ‍‍‍	6	–	6	.500	16	–	12	.571
No. 9 Stanford ‍‍‍	4	–	8	.333	14	–	14	.500
Concordia Irvine ‍‍‍	3	–	9	.250	10	–	16	.385
BYU ‍‍‍	3	–	9	.250	8	–	17	.320
† – Conference champion ‡ – MPSF tournament champion y – Invited to the NCAA tournament Rankings from AVCA

== Roster ==
2022 USC Trojans roster
Defensive specialist/libero: 2 Austin Stuard - Freshman; 3 Cole Paxson - Graduate; 5 Gus Acord - (redshirt) Sophomore; Middle blockers: 17 Teddy Terrill - Freshman; 18 Liam Schroeder - Senior; 19 Lucas Frassrand - Junior; 20 Markus Olsson - Freshman; 22 Christian Thomas - (redshirt) Freshman	Outside hitters: 1 Brandon Browning - Senior; 4 Jackson Reed - Sophomore; 7 Sam Kobrine - Graduate; 9 George Dyer - Junior; 11 Noah Keelin - Freshman; 15 Jack Deuchar - Sophomore; 21 Adam Flood - Junior; 23 Peter Brown - Sophomore; 24 Simon Gallas - (redshirt) Sophomore	Opposite hitters: 7 Sam Kobrine - Graduate; 8 Kyle Paulson - Sophomore; 14 Luke Hobus - Freshman; 19 Lucas Frassrand - Junior; 24 Simon Gallas - (redshirt) Sophomore; Setters: 6 Chris Hall- (redshirt) Senior; 7 Sam Kobrine - Graduate; 8 Kyle Paulson - Sophomore; 10 Jameson McKibbin - (redshirt) Junior; 13 Nate Tennant - Sophomore

== Schedule ==
TV/Internet Streaming information:

All home games will be televised on Pac-12 Network or streamed on Pac-12+ USC. Most road games will also be streamed by the schools streaming service. The conference tournament will be streamed by FloVolleyball.

Date time	Opponent	Rank^{(tournament seed)}	Arena city (tournament)	Television	Score	Attendance	Record (MPSF record)
1/6; 3 p.m.	@ #11 UC Santa Barbara		Robertson Gymnasium; Santa Barbara, CA (UCSB Asics Invitational)	ESPN+	W 3–2 (19–25, 25–22, 17–25, 25–23, 15–8)	1	1–0
1/7; 3 p.m.	@ #11 UC Santa Barbara		Robertson Gymnasium; Santa Barbara, CA (UCSB Asics Invitational)	ESPN+	W 3–1 (20–25, 25–17, 25–18, 25–22)	1	2–0
1/12; 7 p.m.	Princeton	#12	Galen Center; Los Angeles, CA	P12+ USC	W 3–0 (35–33, 25–22, 25–20)	100	3–0
1/14; 10 a.m.	Erskine	#12	Galen Center; Los Angeles, CA	P12+ USC	W 3–0 (25–16, 25–13, 25–13)	50	4–0
1/21; 7:30 p.m.	vs. #3 Penn State	#12	Pauley Pavilion; Los Angeles, CA (Pac-12/Big Ten Challenge)	P12 LA	W 3–1 (25–22, 25–23, 23–25, 25–16)	0	5–0
1/22; 5 p.m.	vs. #11 Ohio State	#12	Pauley Pavilion; Los Angeles, CA (Pac-12/Big Ten Challenge)	P12 Insider	L 1–3 (24–26, 25–16, 18–25, 21–25)	400	5–1
1/26; 7 p.m.	#14 UC Irvine	#10	Galen Center; Los Angeles, CA	P12 LA	W 3–0 (25–16, 25–20, 25–17)	250	6–1
1/28; 8 p.m.	@ #14 UC Irvine	#10	Bren Events Center; Irvine, CA	ESPN+	W 3–2 (29–27, 30–32, 25–13, 22–25, 15–10)	814	7–1
2/02; 7 p.m.	#13 UC San Diego	#7	Galen Center; Los Angeles, CA	P12 LA	W 3–0 (25–23, 25–18, 32–30)	254	8–1
2/04; 7 p.m.	@ #3 Long Beach State	#7	Walter Pyramid; Long Beach, CA	ESPN+	L 1–3 (25–15, 23–25, 21–25, 19–25)	1,729	8–2
2/9; 7 p.m.	#8 UC Santa Barbara	#7	Galen Center; Los Angeles, CA	P12 LA	W 3–0 (25–20, 25–22, 25–23)	303	9–2
2/10; 7 p.m.	CSUN	#7	Galen Center; Los Angeles, CA	P12+ USC	W 3–0 (25–20, 25–18, 25–23)	200	10–2
2/23; 7 p.m.	@ #7 Pepperdine*	#5	Firestone Fieldhouse; Malibu, CA	WaveCasts	L 2–3 (25–23, 17–25, 26–28, 26–24, 13–15)	443	10–3 (0–1)
2/25; 7 p.m.	#7 Pepperdine*	#5	Galen Center; Los Angeles, CA	P12 LA	W 3–1 (22–25, 25–23, 25–19, 25–20)	813	11–3 (1–1)
3/04; 7 p.m.	#15 BYU*	#6	Galen Center; Los Angeles, CA	P12+ USC	W 3–1 (25–23, 25–19, 18–25, 25–20)	450	12–3 (2–1)
3/05; 7 p.m.	#15 BYU*	#6	Galen Center; Los Angeles, CA	P12 LA	W 3–0 (25–18, 25–10, 25–17)	451	13–3 (3–1)
3/09; 7 p.m.	George Mason	#6	Galen Center; Los Angeles, CA	P12+ USC	W 3–0 (25–16, 25–20, 25–16)	258	14–3
3/11; 7 p.m.	Vanguard	#6	Galen Center; Los Angeles, CA	P12+ USC	W 3–1 (25–21, 25–22, 21–25, 25–16)	206	15–3
3/18; 7 p.m.	Menlo	#5	Galen Center; Los Angeles, CA	P12+ USC	W 3–0 (25–12, 25–22, 25–19)	203	16–3
3/25; 7 p.m.	@ #14 Stanford*	#5	Maples Pavilion; Stanford, CA	P12 BAY/LA	L 1–3 (19–25 ,25–20, 16–25, 26–28)	376	16–4 (3–2)
3/26; 6 p.m.	@ #14 Stanford*	#5	Maples Pavilion; Stanford, CA	P12 BAY/LA	W 3–1 (23–25, 25–17, 25–22, 25–21)	450	17–4 (4–2)
3/31; 7 p.m.	#1 UCLA*	#5	Galen Center; Los Angeles, CA	P12 LA	L 0–3 (23–25, 19–25, 17–25)	975	17–5 (4–3)
4/02; 5 p.m.	@ #1 UCLA*	#5	Pauley Pavilion; Los Angeles, CA	P12 LA	L 2–3 (25–23, 19–25, 25–17, 12–25, 12–15)	4,032	17–6 (4–4)
4/08; 7 p.m.	Concordia Irvine*	#6	Galen Center; Los Angeles, CA	P12+ USC	W 3–0 (25–20, 25–23, 25–18)	347	18–6 (5–4)
4/09; 7 p.m.	@ Concordia Irvine*	#6	CU Arena; Irvine, CA	EagleEye	W 3–0 (25–20, 25–23, 33–31)	91	19–6 (6–4)
4/15; 6 p.m.	@ #10 Grand Canyon*	#5	GCU Arena; Phoenix, AZ	ESPN+	W 3–2 (21–25, 15–25, 25–14, 25–23, 15–12)	928	20–6 (7–4)
4/16; 6 p.m.	@ #10 Grand Canyon*	#5	GCU Arena; Phoenix, AZ	ESPN+	W 3–0 (25–22, 25–22, 27–25)	703	21–6 (8–4)
4/20; 2 p.m.	vs. Concordia Irvine^{(7)}	#5^{(2)}	Pauley Pavilion; Los Angeles, CA (MPSF Quarterfinal)	FloVolleyball	W 3–0 (25–19, 25–22, 25–19)	N/A	22–6
4/20; 7 p.m.	vs. Pepperdine^{(3)}	#5^{(2)}	Pauley Pavilion; Los Angeles, CA (MPSF Semifinal)	FloVolleyball	L 1–3 (23–25, 26–28, 25–20, 25–27)	850	22–7

*-Indicates conference match. ^{(#)}-Indicates tournament seeding.
Times listed are Pacific Time Zone.

== Announcers for televised games ==
- UC Santa Barbara: Max Kelton & Katie Spieler
- UC Santa Barbara: Max Kelton & Katie Spieler
- Princeton: Mark Beltran & Paul Duchesne
- Erskine: Mark Beltran & Paul Duchesne
- Penn State: Anne Marie Anderson
- Ohio State: Denny Cline
- UC Irvine: Brian Webber
- UC Irvine: Rob Espero & Charlie Brande
- UC San Diego: Brian Webber
- Long Beach State: Matt Brown & Matt Prosser
- UC Santa Barbara: Kevin Barnett
- CSUN: Mark Beltran & Paul Duchesne
- Pepperdine: Al Epstein
- Pepperdine: Anne Marie Anderson
- BYU: Mark Beltran & Paul Duchesne
- BYU: Anne Marie Anderson
- George Mason: Mark Beltran & Paul Duchesne
- Vanguard: Mark Beltran & Paul Duchesne
- Menlo: Mark Beltran & Paul Duchesne
- Stanford: Ted Enberg
- Stanford: Ted Enberg
- UCLA: Anne Marie Anderson
- UCLA: Anne Marie Anderson
- Concordia Irvine: Mark Beltran & Paul Duchesne
- Concordia Irvine: Kienan Dixon
- Grand Canyon: Diana Johnson & Amanda Roche
- Grand Canyon: Diana Johnson & Houston Boe
- MPSF Quarterfinal- Concordia Irvine: Nick Koop
- MPSF Semifinal- Pepperdine: Darren Preston

== Rankings ==
Ranking movements Legend: ██ Increase in ranking ██ Decrease in ranking RV = Received votes
	Week																	
Poll	Pre	1	2	3	4	5	6	7	8	9	10	11	12	13	14	15	16	Final
AVCA Coaches	RV	12	12	10	7	7	5	5	6	6	5	5	5	6	5	5		
Off the Block Media	Not released	RV	10	7	7	7	6	5										

^The Media did not release a Pre-season poll.
