= 2022 Harvard Crimson men's volleyball team =

American college volleyball season

2022 Harvard Crimson men's volleyball
- Conference: Eastern Intercollegiate Volleyball Association
- Record: 12–13 (10–6 EIVA)
- Head coach: Brian Baise (12th season)
- Assistant coach: Nick Clark (1st season)
- Home arena: Malkin Athletic Center

The 2022 Harvard Crimson men's volleyball team represented Harvard University in the 2022 NCAA Division I & II men's volleyball season. The Crimson, led by 12th year head coach Brian Baise, played their home games at Malkin Athletic Center. The Crimson were members of the EIVA and returned to play after missing the 2021 season due to the corona virus cancelled Ivy League seasons. They were picked to finish sixth in the EIVA preseason poll.

2022 Eastern Intercollegiate Volleyball Association standings
	Conf.				Overall
Team	W		L	PCT	W		L	PCT
No. 6 Penn State ‍†‍‍	16	–	0	1.000	23	–	4	.852
NJIT ‍‍‍	10	–	6	.625	17	–	10	.630
Harvard ‍‍‍	10	–	6	.625	12	–	13	.480
Princeton ‍‍‡‍^{y}	10	–	6	.625	16	–	12	.571
Saint Francis ‍‍‍	8	–	8	.500	15	–	13	.536
George Mason ‍‍‍	7	–	9	.438	13	–	15	.464
Charleston (WV) ‍‍‍	5	–	11	.313	9	–	14	.391
St. Francis Brooklyn ‍‍‍	4	–	12	.250	10	–	15	.400
Sacred Heart ‍‍‍	2	–	14	.125	10	–	17	.370
† – Conference champion ‡ – EIVA tournament champion y – Invited to the NCAA tournament Rankings from AVCA

== Season highlights ==
- Will be filled in as the season progresses.

== Roster ==
Number	Name	Class	Position	Height	Hometown
1	Andrew Lobo	Freshman	Outside hitter	6-2	Toronto, Ontario
2	Ethan Smith	Sophomore	Middle blocker	6-7	Laguna Niguel, California
3	Ryan Hong	Junior	Middle blocker/Outside Hitter	6-2	Honolulu, Hawaii
4	Kade McGovern	Freshman	Opposite hitter	6-6	Burbank, California
5	Azim Raheem	Freshman	Opposite hitter	6-6	Toronto, Ontario
6	Alessio Pignatelli	Junior	Libero/Defensive Specialist	5-11	Acqui Terme, Italy
7	Eric Li	Senior	Outside hitter	6-6	Edison, New Jersey
9	Ethan McCrary	Sophomore	Middle blocker	6-9	Mission Viejo, California
10	Logan Shepherd	Freshman	Outside hitter	6-4	Cave Springs, Arkansas
11	Will Polster	Junior	Outside hitter	6-1	Maryland Heights, Missouri
12	Campbell Schoenfeld	Senior	Outside hitter	6-8	N. Tonawanada, New York
13	Buddy Scott	Senior	Setter	6-6	Honolulu, Hawaii
16	Xuanthe Nguyen	Freshman	Libero	5-11	London, England
17	Jason Shen	Senior	Libero	5-11	Cupertino, California
18	Will Sorenson	Junior	Setter	6-1	Killdeer, Illinois
19	Owen Fanning	Freshman	Outside hitter	6-7	Needham, Massachusetts
21	James Bardin	Freshman	Setter	6-7	Aliso Viejo, California
22	Trevor Schultz	Sophomore	Middle blocker	6-6	Saint Augustine, Florida
23	Jeffrey Kwan	Sophomore	Libero/Outside Hitter	5-11	Cupertino, California

== Schedule ==
TV/Internet Streaming information:

All home games will be streamed on ESPN+. Most road games will also be streamed by the schools streaming service.

Date Time	Opponent	Rank	Arena City (Tournament)	Television	Score	Attendance	Record (EIVA Record)
1/12; 10 p.m.	@ UC Irvine		Bren Events Center; Irvine, CA	ESPN+	L 0–3 (19–25, 22–25, 21–25)	377	0–1
1/14; 10 p.m.	@ #10 UC San Diego		RIMAC Arena; La Jolla, CA	ESPN+	L 1–3 (25–16, 16–25, 20–25, 23–25)	0	0–2
1/15; 10:30 p.m.	@ Long Beach State		Walter Pyramid; Long Beach, CA	ESPN+	L 0–3 (18–25, 16–25, 23–25)	1,230	0–3
1/21; 7 p.m.	Queens		Malkin Athletic Center; Cambridge, MA	ESPN+	W 3–0 (25–20, 25–14, 25–19)	50	1–3
1/22; 5 p.m.	King		Malkin Athletic Center; Cambridge, MA	ESPN+	W 3–0 (25–16, 25–19, 25–16)	50	2–3
2/5; 5 p.m.	Purdue Fort Wayne		Malkin Athletic Center; Cambridge, MA	ESPN+	L 1–3 (17–25, 25–20, 24–26, 20–25)	150	2–4
2/11; 7 p.m.	#4 Penn State*		Malkin Athletic Center; Cambridge, MA	ESPN+	L 0–3 (22–25, 26–28, 19–25)	350	2–5 (0–1)
2/12; 5 p.m.	St. Francis*		Malkin Athletic Center; Cambridge, MA	ESPN+	L 1–3 (25–27, 22–25, 25–19, 20–25)	112	2–6 (0–2)
2/18; 7 p.m.	St. Francis Brooklyn*		Malkin Athletic Center; Cambridge, MA	ESPN+	W 3–1 (25–17, 21–25, 25–20, 25–20)	113	3–6 (1–2)
2/19; 7 p.m.	NJIT*		Malkin Athletic Center; Cambridge, MA	ESPN+	W 3–1 (25–20, 25–22, 25–27, 25–16)	206	4–6 (2–2)
3/4; 7 p.m.	Princeton*		Malkin Athletic Center; Cambridge, MA	ESPN+	W 3–1 (25–22, 25–23, 22–25, 26–24)	303	5–6 (3–2)
3/5; 5 p.m.	Princeton*		Malkin Athletic Center; Cambridge, MA	ESPN+	W 3–1 (22–25, 25–22, 25–9, 25–23)	304	6–6 (4–2)
3/12; 8 p.m.	@ #9 Grand Canyon		GCU Arena; Phoenix, AZ	ESPN+	L 0–3 (20–25, 14–25, 22–25)	428	6–7
3/13; 6 p.m.	@ #9 Grand Canyon		GCU Arena; Phoenix, AZ	ESPN+	L 0–3 (22–25, 16–25, 22–25)	278	6–8
3/18; 6 p.m.	@ Sacred Heart*		William H. Pitt Center; Fairfield, CT	NEC Front Row	W 3–1 (23–25, 25–18, 25–14, 25–20)	163	7–8 (5–2)
3/19; 5 p.m.	Sacred Heart*		Malkin Athletic Center; Cambridge, MA	ESPN+	W 3–1 (25–22, 23–25, 25–17, 25–18)	252	8–8 (6–2)
3/25; 7 p.m.	@ #2 Penn State*		Rec Hall; University Park, PA	B1G+	L 0–3 (12–25, 17–25, 20–25)	630	8–9 (6–3)
3/26; 4 p.m.	@ St. Francis*		DeGol Arena; Loretto, PA	NEC Front Row	W 3–1 (23–25, 31–29, 26–24, 31–29)	0	9–9 (7–3)
4/1; 7 p.m.	@ St. Francis Brooklyn*		Generoso Pope Athletic Complex; Brooklyn, NY	NEC Front Row	W 3–0 (25–19, 25–13, 25–22)	53	10–9 (8–3)
4/2; 4 p.m.	@ NJIT*		Wellness and Events Center; Newark, NJ	ESPN+	L 0–3 (21–25, 19–25, 20–25)	223	10–10 (8–4)
4/8; 7 p.m.	Charleston (WV)*		Malkin Athletic Center; Cambridge, MA	ESPN+	L 1–3 (25–22, 24–26, 21–25, 32–34)	238	10–11 (8–5)
4/9; 5 p.m.	Charleston (WV)*		Malkin Athletic Center; Cambridge, MA	ESPN+	L 2–3 (25–17, 22–25, 24–26, 25–13, 11–15)	230	10–12 (8–6)
4/15; 7 p.m.	@ George Mason*		Recreation Athletic Complex; Fairfax, VA	ESPN+	W 3–2 (18–25, 25–21, 25–17, 21–25, 15–11)	466	11–12 (9–6)
4/16; 4 p.m.	@ George Mason*		Recreation Athletic Complex; Fairfax, VA	ESPN+	W 3–0 (25–19, 31–29, 25–21)	212	12–12 (10–6)
4/21; 4 p.m.	vs. NJIT		Rec Hall; University Park, PA (MIVA Semifinals)	B1G+	L 1–3 (25–17, 21–25, 18–25, 22–25)	722	12–13

*-Indicates conference match.
Times listed are Eastern Time Zone.

== Announcers for televised games ==
- UC Irvine: Rob Espero & Charlie Brande
- UC San Diego: Bryan Fenley & Ricci Luyties
- Long Beach State: Matt Brown & Tyler Kulakowski
- Queens: Ben Altsher & Justin Gallanty
- King: Ben Altsher & Eric Gallanty
- Purdue Fort Wayne: Craig White & Matt Corsetti
- Penn State: Dana Grey & Ben Altsher
- St. Francis: Dana Grey & Eric Gallanty
- St. Francis Brooklyn: Craig White & Dana Grey
- NJIT: Dylan Hornblum
- Princeton: Ben Altsher
- Princeton: Ben Altsher
- Grand Canyon: Diana Johnson & Amanda Roach
- Grand Canyon: Diana Johnson & Houston Boe
- Sacred Heart: Brendan Picozzi
- Sacred Heart: Luis Sanchez & Justin Gallanty
- Penn State: Austin Groft & Thomas English
- St. Francis: Matt Manz & Sophie Rice
- St. Francis Brooklyn: Marc Ernay
- NJIT: Ira Thor
- Charleston (WV): Ben Altsher
- Charleston (WV): Ben Altsher & Dylan Hornblum
- George Mason: Josh Yorkshire & Aylene Ilkson
- George Mason: Tyler Byrum
- NJIT: Matt Scalzo & Alex Rocco
