= 2022 BYU Cougars men's volleyball team =

American college volleyball season

2022 BYU Cougars men's volleyball
- Conference: Mountain Pacific Sports Federation
- Record: 8–17 (3–9 MPSF)
- Head coach: Shawn Olmstead (7th season)
- Assistant coaches: Devin Young (4th season); Micah Naone (4th season)
- Home arena: Smith Fieldhouse

The 2022 BYU Cougars men's volleyball team represented Brigham Young University in the 2022 NCAA Division I & II men's volleyball season. The Cougars, led by seventh year head coach Shawn Olmstead, played their home games at Smith Fieldhouse. The Cougars were members of the MPSF and were picked to finish third in the MPSF preseason poll. After finishing last season ranked #2 the Cougars enter the 2022 season with the #6 ranking.

2022 Mountain Pacific Sports Federation men's volleyball standings
	Conf.				Overall
Team	W		L	PCT	W		L	PCT
No. 4 UCLA ‍†‍‍^{y}	11	–	1	.917	22	–	5	.815
No. 7 USC ‍‍‍	8	–	4	.667	22	–	7	.759
No. 5 Pepperdine ‍‍‡‍^{y}	7	–	5	.583	19	–	10	.655
No. 11 Grand Canyon ‍‍‍	6	–	6	.500	16	–	12	.571
No. 9 Stanford ‍‍‍	4	–	8	.333	14	–	14	.500
Concordia Irvine ‍‍‍	3	–	9	.250	10	–	16	.385
BYU ‍‍‍	3	–	9	.250	8	–	17	.320
† – Conference champion ‡ – MPSF tournament champion y – Invited to the NCAA tournament Rankings from AVCA

== Roster ==
2022 BYU Cougars roster
Defensive specialist/libero: 4 Jon Stanley - Junior; 6 Jackson Fife - Freshman; 12 Mitchel Worthington - Senior; Middle blockers: 5 Alessandro Gianotti - Freshman; 10 Gavin Julien - (redshirt) Sophomore; 17 Branden Oberender - (redshirt) Senior; 19 Ethan Gant - Freshman; 21 Teon Taylor - Freshman	Outside hitters: 1 Davide Gardini - Senior; 3 Kupono Browne - Sophomore; 9 Jack Palmer - Freshman; 11 Jared Brady - Freshman; 18 Luke Benson - Freshman; 23 Miks Ramanis - Freshman	Opposite hitters: 2 Alex Ah Sue - Senior; 13 Anthony Cherfan - Freshman; Setters: 7 Truman Morley - Freshman; 8 Bartosz Slawinski - Sophomore; 14 Zeo Meyer - Sophomore; 16 Noa Haine - Freshman

== Schedule ==
TV/Internet Streaming information:

All home games will be televised on BYUtv or BYUtv.org. Most road games will also be streamed by the schools streaming service. The conference tournament will be streamed by FloVolleyball.

Date time	Opponent	Rank^{(tournament seed)}	Arena city (tournament)	Television	Score	Attendance	Record (MPSF record)
1/6; 5 p.m.	@ #5 Penn State	#6	Rec Hall; State College, PA	B1G+	L 0–3 (14–25, 18–25, 19–25)	197	0–1
1/8; 5 p.m.	@ #5 Penn State	#6	Rec Hall; State College, PA	B1G+	L 0–3 (21–25, 19–25, 24–26)	473	0–2
1/21; 7 p.m.	#13 UC Irvine	#10	Smith Fieldhouse; Provo, UT	BYUtv	W 3–2 (25–23, 25–23, 17–25, 25–27, 15–12)	3,174	1–2
1/22; 7 p.m.	#13 UC Irvine	#10	Smith Fieldhouse; Provo, UT	BYUtv.org	W 3–0 (25–22, 25–18, 25–21)	2,691	2–2
1/27; 7 p.m.	Mount Olive	#8	Smith Fieldhouse; Provo, UT	BYUtv	W 3–2 (24–26, 25–19, 25–20, 22–25, 15–12)	2,509	3–2
1/29; 7 p.m.	Mount Olive	#8	Smith Fieldhouse; Provo, UT	BYUtv	W 3–1 (26–24, 27–25, 19–25, 25–20)	3,224	4–2
2/04; 7 p.m.	#10 Ball State	#9	Smith Fieldhouse; Provo, UT	BYUtv	W 3–2 (30–32, 20–25, 25–20, 25–22, 15–10)	2,990	5–2
2/05; 7 p.m.	#10 Ball State	#9	Smith Fieldhouse; Provo, UT	BYUtv	L 1–3 (25–23, 19–25, 31–33, 20–25)	2,702	5–3
2/11; 7 p.m.	#14 UC San Diego	#11	Smith Fieldhouse; Provo, UT	BYUtv	L 2–3 (27–25, 25–23, 18–25, 29–31, 11–15)	3,019	5–4
2/12; 7 p.m.	#14 UC San Diego	#11	Smith Fieldhouse; Provo, UT	BYUtv	L 2–3 (22–25, 25–15, 25–22, 15–25, 12–15)	3,085	5–5
2/18; 8 p.m.	@ #6 UC Santa Barbara	#13	The Thunderdome; Isla Vista, CA	ESPN+	L 0–3 (21–25, 18–25, 23–25)	100	5–6
2/19; 8 p.m.	@ #6 UC Santa Barbara	#13	Robertson Gymnasium; Santa Barbara, CA		L 1–3 (22–25, 26–28, 28–26, 24–26)	125	5–7
2/25; 7 p.m.	#9 Grand Canyon*	#13	Smith Fieldhouse; Provo, UT	BYUtv	L 1–3 (25–21, 19–25, 19–25, 22–25)	3,149	5–8 (0–1)
2/26; 7 p.m.	#9 Grand Canyon*	#13	Smith Fieldhouse; Provo, UT	BYUtv	L 2–3 (26–24, 30–28, 22–25, 26–28, 16–18)	2,753	5–9 (0–2)
3/04; 8 p.m.	@ #6 USC*	#15	Galen Center; Los Angeles, CA	P12+ USC	L 1–3 (23–25, 19–25, 25–18, 20–25)	450	5–10 (0–3)
3/05; 8 p.m.	@ #6 USC*	#15	Galen Center; Los Angeles, CA	P12 LA	L 0–3 (18–25, 10–25, 17–25)	451	5–11 (0–4)
3/11; 7 p.m.	Concordia Irvine*		Smith Fieldhouse; Provo, UT	BYUtv	W 3–0 (25–16, 25–14, 25–17)	3,069	6–11 (1–4)
3/12; 7 p.m.	Concordia Irvine*		Smith Fieldhouse; Provo, UT	BYUtv	W 3–1 (19–25, 25–21, 25–18, 25–22)	3,041	7–11 (2–4)
3/25; 7 p.m.	@ #7 Pepperdine*		Firestone Fieldhouse; Malibu, CA	WaveCasts	W 3–2 (32–30, 21–25, 20–25, 31–29, 15–9)	705	8–11 (3–4)
3/26; 7 p.m.	@ #7 Pepperdine*		Firestone Fieldhouse; Malibu, CA	WaveCasts	L 0–3 (22–25, 21–25, 19–25)	682	8–12 (3–5)
4/08; 8 p.m.	@ #12 Stanford*		Maples Pavilion; Stanford, CA	P12 BAY	L 0–3 (27–29, 20–25, 22–25)	630	8–13 (3–6)
4/09; 7 p.m.	@ #12 Stanford*		Maples Pavilion; Stanford, CA	P12 BAY	L 2–3 (25–19, 27–25, 23–25, 20–25, 22–24)	1,142	8–14 (3–7)
4/15; 7 p.m.	#1 UCLA*		Smith Fieldhouse; Provo, UT	BYUtv	L 1–3 (25–20, 23–25, 16–25, 18–25)	3,987	8–15 (3–8)
4/16; 7 p.m.	#1 UCLA*		Smith Fieldhouse; Provo, UT	BYUtv	L 2–3 (28–26, 25–20, 23–25, 22–25, 9–15)	4,185	8–16 (3–9)
4/20; 6 p.m.	#8 Pepperdine^{(3)}	^{(6)}	Pauley Pavilion; Los Angeles, CA (MPSF Quarterfinal)	FloVolleyball	L 2–3 (22—25, 20–25, 25–23, 25–21, 14–16)	450	8–17

*-Indicates conference match.
Times listed are Mountain Time Zone.

== Announcers for televised games ==
- Penn State: No commentary
- Penn State: Jake Starr & Jordan Mansberger
- UC Irvine: Jarom Jordan, Steve Vail & Kiki Solano
- UC Irvine: Jarom Jordan, Steve Vail, & Kiki Solano
- Mount Olive: Spencer Linton, Steve Vail, & Kiki Solano
- Mount Olive: Spencer Linton, Steve Vail, & Kiki Solano
- Ball State: Jarom Jordan, Steve Vail, & Kiki Solano
- Ball State: Jarom Jordan, Steve Vail, & Kiki Solano
- UC San Diego: Jarom Jordan, Steve Vail, & Kiki Solano
- UC San Diego: Jarom Jordan, Steve Vail, & Kiki Solano
- UC Santa Barbara: Max Kelton & Katie Spieler
- Grand Canyon: Jarom Jordan, Steve Vail, & Kiki Solano
- Grand Canyon: Jarom Jordan, Steve Vail, & Kiki Solano
- USC: Mark Beltran & Paul Duchesne
- USC: Anne Marie Anderson
- Concordia Irvine: Jarom Jordan, Steve Vail, & Kiki Solano
- Concordia Irvine: Jarom Jordan, Steve Vail, & Kiki Solano
- Pepperdine: Al Epstein
- Pepperdine: Al Epstein
- Stanford: Ted Enberg
- Stanford: Ted Enberg
- UCLA: Jarom Jordan, Steve Vail, & Kiki Solano
- UCLA: Jarom Jordan, Steve Vail, & Kiki Solano
- MPSF Quarterfinal- Pepperdine: Nick Kopp

== Rankings ==
Ranking movements Legend: ██ Increase in ranking ██ Decrease in ranking — = Not ranked RV = Received votes
	Week																	
Poll	Pre	1	2	3	4	5	6	7	8	9	10	11	12	13	14	15	16	Final
AVCA Coaches	6	7	10	8	9	11	13	13	15	RV	RV	RV	RV	RV	RV	—		
Off the Block Media	Not released	9	RV	9	RV	RV	—	—	—	—	—	—	—	—	—			

^The Media did not release a Pre-season poll.
