= 2022 Penn State Nittany Lions men's volleyball team =

American college volleyball season

2022 Penn State Nittany Lions men's volleyball

EIVA Regular Season Champions
- Conference: Eastern Intercollegiate Volleyball Association
- Record: 23–4 (16–0 EIVA)
- Head coach: Mark Pavlik (28th season)
- Assistant coaches: Colin McMillan (15th season); Ryan Walthall (6th season)
- Home arena: Rec Hall

2022 Eastern Intercollegiate Volleyball Association standings
	Conf.				Overall
Team	W		L	PCT	W		L	PCT
No. 6 Penn State ‍†‍‍	16	–	0	1.000	23	–	4	.852
NJIT ‍‍‍	10	–	6	.625	17	–	10	.630
Harvard ‍‍‍	10	–	6	.625	12	–	13	.480
Princeton ‍‍‡‍^{y}	10	–	6	.625	16	–	12	.571
Saint Francis ‍‍‍	8	–	8	.500	15	–	13	.536
George Mason ‍‍‍	7	–	9	.438	13	–	15	.464
Charleston (WV) ‍‍‍	5	–	11	.313	9	–	14	.391
St. Francis Brooklyn ‍‍‍	4	–	12	.250	10	–	15	.400
Sacred Heart ‍‍‍	2	–	14	.125	10	–	17	.370
† – Conference champion ‡ – EIVA tournament champion y – Invited to the NCAA tournament Rankings from AVCA

The 2022 Penn State Nittany Lions men's volleyball team represented Pennsylvania State University in the 2022 NCAA Division I & II men's volleyball season. The Nittany Lions, led by 28th year head coach Mark Pavlik, played their home games at Rec Hall. The Nittany Lions were members of the Eastern Intercollegiate Volleyball Association and were picked to win the EIVA in the preseason poll.

== Roster ==
2022 Penn State Nittany Lions roster
Defensive Specialist/Libero: 7 Ryan Merk - Freshman; 20 Will Bantle - (redshirt) Senior; Middle blockers: 13 Owen Rose - Freshman; 14 Sam Marsh - Senior; 15 Canyon Tuman - Senior; 16 Ian Argento - Sophomore; 18 Toby Ezeonu - Sophomore	Outside hitters: 2 Tim Herget - Junior; 3 Jack Shampine - Junior; 4 Michael Valenzi - Sophomore; 5 Matt Cosgrove - Freshman; 8 Michal Kowal - Sophomore; 10 Gabe Hartke - Junior; 12 Brett Wildman - Senior; 17 Will Kuhns - Sophomore	Opposite hitters: 9 John Kerr - Junior; 19 Cal Fisher - Senior; 22 Cole Ignaszak - Freshman; Setters: 1 Luke Snyder - Sophomore; 6 Cole Bogner - Senior; 11 Jack Driscoll - Junior; 21 Tyler Herget - Freshman

== Schedule ==
Date Time	Opponent	Rank	Arena City (Tournament)	Television	Score	Attendance	Record (EIVA Record)
1/6; 7 p.m.	#6 BYU	#5	Rec Hall; University Park, PA	B1G+	W 3–0 (25–14, 25–18, 25–19)	197	1–0
1/8; 7 p.m.	#6 BYU	#5	Rec Hall; University Park, PA	B1G+	W 3–0 (25–21, 25–19, 26–24)	473	2–0
1/13; 7 p.m.	#6 Grand Canyon	#4	Rec Hall; University Park, PA	B1G+	W 3–0 (25–17, 25–21, 25–22)	437	3–0
1/15; 7 p.m.	#6 Grand Canyon	#4	Rec Hall; University Park, PA	B1G+	W 3–0 (25–18, 25–18, 25–13)	486	4–0
1/21; 10:30 p.m.	vs. #12 USC	#3	Pauley Pavilion; Los Angeles, CA (Big Ten/Pac 12 Challenge)	P12 LA	L 1–3 (22–25, 23–25, 25–23, 16–25)	N/A	4–1
1/22; 10:30 p.m.	@ #2 UCLA	#3	Pauley Pavilion; Los Angeles, CA (Big Ten/Pac 12 Challenge)	P12 Insider	L 1–3 (25–17, 26–28, 22–25, 19–25)	1,047	4–2
1/28; 9 p.m.	@ UC Santa Barbara	#4	The Thunderdome; Isla Vista, CA (Battle of the Bigs)	ESPN+	L 0–3 (13–25, 21–25, 21–25)	111	4–3
1/29; 10 p.m.	@ #3 Long Beach State	#4	Walter Pyramid; Long Beach, CA (Battle of the Bigs)	ESPN+	W 3–2 (25–27, 25–21, 20–25, 25–23, 15–11)	1,288	5–3
2/04; 7 p.m.	Princeton*	#5	Rec Hall; University Park, PA	B1G+	W 3–0 (25–18, 25–22, 25–7)	436	6–3 (1–0)
2/05; 7 p.m.	George Mason*	#5	Rec Hall; University Park, PA	B1G+	W 3–0 (25–16, 25–16, 25–23)	662	7–3 (2–0)
2/11; 7 p.m.	@ Harvard*	#4	Malkin Athletic Center; Cambridge, MA	ESPN+	W 3–0 (25–22, 28–26, 25–19)	350	8–3 (3–0)
2/12; 4 p.m.	@ Sacred Heart*	#4	William H. Pitt Center; Fairfield, CT	NEC Front Row	W 3–0 (25–13, 25–17, 25–16)	263	9–3 (4–0)
2/19; 7 p.m.	St. Francis*	#4	Rec Hall South Gym; University Park, PA	B1G+	W 3–0 (25–21, 25–10, 25–20)	654	10–3 (5–0)
2/25; 7 p.m.	@ St. Francis Brooklyn*	#4	Generoso Pope Athletic Complex; Brooklyn, NY	NEC Front Row	W 3–0 (25–18, 25–14, 27–25)	85	11–3 (6–0)
2/26; 7 p.m.	@ NJIT*	#4	Wellness and Events Center; Newark, NJ	ESPN3	W 3–2 (23–25, 25–21, 25–18, 16–25, 15–13)	308	12–3 (7–0)
3/04; 7 p.m.	Charleston (WV)*	#4	Rec Hall; University Park, PA	B1G+	W 3–0 (25–14, 25–17, 25–14)	273	13–3 (8–0)
3/08; 7 p.m.	@ #13 Ohio State	#3	Covelli Center; Columbus, OH (Big Ten Showdown)	B1G+	W 3–0 (25–23, 25–23, 25–21)	913	14–3
3/13; 4 p.m.	#13 Ohio State*	#3	Rec Hall; University Park, PA (Big Ten Showdown)	B1G+	W 3–1 (25–20, 25–21, 23–25, 25–15)	543	15–3
3/18; 7 p.m.	@ Princeton*	#2	Jadwin Gymnasium; Princeton, NJ	ESPN+	W 3–1 (25–16, 25–23, 23–25, 25–21)	0	16–3 (9–0)
3/20; 3 p.m.	@ George Mason*	#2	Recreation Athletic Complex; Fairfax, VA	ESPN+	W 3–0 (25–20, 25–13, 25–19)	907	17–3 (10–0)
3/25; 7 p.m.	Harvard*	#2	Rec Hall; University Park, PA	B1G+	W 3–0 (25–12, 25–16, 25–20)	630	18–3 (11–0)
3/26; 7 p.m.	Sacred Heart*	#2	Rec Hall; University Park, PA	B1G+	W 3–0 (25–16, 31–29, 25–20)	682	19–3 (12–0)
4/2; 6 p.m.	@ St. Francis*	#3	DeGol Arena; Loretto, PA	NEC Front Row	W 3–0 (28–26, 25–21, 25–18)	0	20–3 (13–0)
4/8; 7 p.m.	St. Francis Brooklyn*	#3	Rec Hall; University Park, PA	B1G+	W 3–0 (25–12, 25–21, 25–17)	588	21–3 (14–0)
4/09; 7 p.m.	NJIT*	#3	Rec Hall; University Park, PA	B1G+	W 3–0 (25–23, 25–19, 25–21)	654	22–3 (15–0)
4/15; 7 p.m.	@ Charleston (WV)*	#2	Russell and Martha Wehrle Innovation Center; Charleston, WV	Mountain East Network	W 3–1 (25–18, 25–21, 15–25, 25–12)	50	23–3 (16–0)

*-Indicates conference match.
Times listed are Eastern Time Zone.

== Broadcasters ==
- BYU: No commentary
- BYU: Jake Starr & Jordan Mansberger
- Grand Canyon: Connor Griffin & Alex Rocco
- Grand Canyon: Zech Lambert & Alex Rocco
- USC: Anne Marie Anderson
- UCLA: Denny Cline
- UC Santa Barbara: Max Kelton & Katie Spieler
- Long Beach State: Matt Brown & Matt Prosser
- Princeton: Logan Bourandus & Matt Scalzo
- George Mason: Logan Bourandus & Emma Holt
- Harvard: Dana Grey & Ben Altsher
- Sacred Heart: Brendan Picozzi
- St. Francis: Preston Shoemaker & Jon Draeger
- St. Francis Brooklyn: Marc Ernay
- NJIT: Ira Thor & Mike Ventola
- Charleston (WV): No commentary
- Ohio State: Tyler Danburg & Joey Veer
- Ohio State: Mac Young & Austin Groft
- Princeton: Adam Dobrowolski & Melina Mahood
- George Mason:
- Harvard: Austin Groft & Thomas English
- Sacred Heart: Dale Ostrander & Aidan Torok
- St. Francis: Matt Manz & Sophie Rice
- St. Francis Brooklyn: Thomas English & Trevor Grady
- NJIT: Neil Conley & Evan Popalis
- Charleston (WV): No commentary

== Rankings ==
Ranking movements Legend: ██ Increase in ranking ██ Decrease in ranking т = Tied with team above or below
	Week																	
Poll	Pre	1	2	3	4	5	6	7	8	9	10	11	12	13	14	15	16	Final
AVCA Coaches	5	4	3	4	5	4	4	4	4									
Off the Block Media	Not released	4	2	4	5	4	4т	4										

^The Media did not release a Pre-season poll.

== Honors ==
To be filled in upon completion of the season.
