= 2022 UC San Diego Tritons men's volleyball team =

American college volleyball season

2022 UC San Diego Tritons men's volleyball
- Conference: Big West Conference
- Record: 13–11 (5–5 Big West)
- Head coach: Kevin Ring (17th season)
- Assistant coaches: Jon Girten (5th season); Jake Penolio (5th season)
- Home arena: RIMAC Arena

2022 Big West Conference men's volleyball standings
	Conf.				Overall
Team	W		L	PCT	W		L	PCT
No. 2 Long Beach State ‍†‍‍^{y}	8	–	2	.800	21	–	6	.778
No. 1 Hawai'i ‍‍‡‍^{y}	7	–	3	.700	27	–	5	.844
No. 8 UC Santa Barbara ‍‍‍	6	–	4	.600	19	–	9	.679
No. 10 UC San Diego ‍‍‍	5	–	5	.500	13	–	11	.542
No. 13 UC Irvine ‍‍‍	3	–	7	.300	10	–	15	.400
CSUN ‍‍‍	1	–	9	.100	6	–	15	.286
† – Conference champion ‡ – 2022 Big West Tournament champion: y- Invited to the NCAA volleyball tournament As of March 13, 2025 Rankings from AVCA

The 2022 UC San Diego Tritons men's volleyball team represented the University of California San Diego in the 2022 NCAA Division I & II men's volleyball season. The Tritons, led by seventeenth year head coach Kevin Ring, played their home games at the RIMAC. The Tritons competed as members of the Big West Conference and were picked to finish sixth in the Big West preseason poll.

== Roster ==
2022 UC San Diego Tritons roster
Defensive specialist/libero: 4 Matt Palma - Senior; 20 Paya Vatanshenas - (redshirt) Freshman; Middle blockers: 2 Logan Clark - Senior; 12 Nick Rigo - Sophomore; 14 Jim Garrison - Freshman; 16 Shane Benetz - Senior; 24 Peter Selcho - Freshman; 25 Michael Urdahl - (redshirt) Junior	Outside hitters: 1 Ben Blakely - Freshman; 7 Matthew Lim - Freshman; 8 Wyatt Harrison - Senior; 9 Ryan Ka - (redshirt) Junior; 10 Josh Schellinger - Freshman; 11 Brett Pursley - Freshman; 17 Charlie Siragusa - Senior; 21 Kyle McCauley - Senior; 22 Jason Lee - Freshman	Opposite hitters: 1 Ben Blakely - Freshman; 3 Gabriel Dyer - Freshman; 13 Berkeley Miesfeld - (redshirt) Junior; 17 Charlie Siragusa - Senior; Setters: 3 Gabriel Dyer - Freshman; 18 Andrew Boyle - Sophomore; 23 Blake Crisp - Senior

== Schedule ==
TV/Internet Streaming/Radio information:

ESPN+ will carry all home and conference road games. All other road broadcasts will be carried by the schools respective streaming partner.

Date time	Opponent	Rank	Arena city (tournament)	Television	Score	Attendance	Record (Big West Record)
1/7; 3 p.m.	vs. USC	#10	Robertson Gymnasium; Santa Barbara, CA (UCSB Asics Invitational)	ESPN+	Cancelled- COVID-19		
1/7; 8 p.m.	vs. #2 UCLA	#10	Robertson Gymnasium; Santa Barbara, CA (UCSB Asics Invitational)	ESPN+	Cancelled- COVID-19		
1/8; 3 p.m.	@ #11 UC Santa Barbara	#10	Robertson Gymnasium; Santa Barbara, CA	ESPN+	Cancelled- COVID-19		
1/8; 5:30 p.m.	vs. Concordia Irvine	#10	Robertson Gymnasium; Santa Barbara, CA	ESPN+	Cancelled- COVID-19		
1/14; 7 p.m.	Harvard	#10	RIMAC Arena; La Jolla, CA	ESPN+	W 3–1 (16–25, 25–16, 25–20, 25–23)	0	1–0
1/15; 7 p.m.	@ #12 Stanford	#10	RIMAC Arena; La Jolla, CA	ESPN+	W 3–0 (25–20, 25–22, 25–23)	0	2–0
1/21; 7 p.m.	#9 Grand Canyon	#8	RIMAC Arena; La Jolla, CA	ESPN+	L 1–3 (21–25, 19–25, 26–24, 20–25)	0	2–1
1/28; 3 p.m.	@ NJIT	#12	Wellness and Events Center; Newark, NJ	America East TV	L 2–3 (25–22, 25–17, 16–25, 29–31, 10–15)	255	2–2
1/29; 3 p.m.	@ Princeton	#12	Dillon Gymnasium; Princeton, NJ	ESPN+	W 3–1 (26–24, 25–19, 23–25, 25–15)	125	3–2
2/2; 7 p.m.	@ #7 USC	#13	Galen Center; Los Angeles, CA	P12 LA	L 0–3 (20–25, 22–25, 23–25)	254	3–3
2/4; 7 p.m.	Concordia Irvine	#13	RIMAC Arena; La Jolla, CA	ESPN+	W 3–0 (25–23, 25–20, 25–20)	231	3–4
2/9; 7 p.m.	#2 UCLA	#14	RIMAC Arena; La Jolla, CA	ESPN+	L 1–3 (25–22, 18–25, 23–25, 16–25)	1,505	3–5
2/11; 6 p.m.	@ #11 BYU	#14	Smith Fieldhouse; Provo, UT	BYUtv	W 3–2 (25–27, 23–25, 25–18, 31–29, 15–11)	3,019	4–5
2/12; 6 p.m.	@ #11 BYU	#14	Smith Fieldhouse; Provo, UT	BYUtv	W 3–2 (25–22, 15–25, 22–25, 25–15, 15–12)	3,085	5–5
2/18; 7 p.m.	UC Santa Cruz	#11	RIMAC Arena; La Jolla, CA	ESPN+	W 3–0 (25–20, 25–21, 25–20)	520	6–5
2/19; 7 p.m.	Concordia Irvine	#11	RIMAC Arena; La Jolla, CA	ESPN+	W 3–0 (25–23, 25–20, 25–20)	231	7–5
2/24; 7 p.m.	@ #6 UC Santa Barbara*	#11	The Thunderdome; Isla Vista, CA	ESPN+	L 1–3 (20–25, 25–23, 19–25, 21–25)	272	7–6 (0–1)
3/2; 7 p.m.	#3 Hawai'i*	#10	RIMAC Arena; La Jolla, CA	ESPN+	W 3–2 (25–22, 25–23, 25–27, 18–25, 15–9)	751	8–6 (1–1)
3/4; 7 p.m.	#3 Hawai'i*	#10	RIMAC Arena; La Jolla, CA	ESPN+	L 0–3 (22–25, 20–25, 19–25)	957	8–7 (1–2)
3/10; 7 p.m.	@ Concordia Irvine	#10	CU Arena; Irvine, CA	EagleEye	W 3–1 (20–25, 25–19, 28–26, 30–28)	83	9–7
3/25; 7 p.m.	#13 UC Irvine*	#10	RIMAC Arena; La Jolla, CA	ESPN+	W 3–1 (25–21, 26–24, 22–25, 30–28)	406	10–7 (2–2)
3/26; 7 p.m.	@ #13 UC Irvine*	#10	Bren Events Center; Irvine, CA	ESPN+	W 3–2 (25–23, 25–27, 26–16, 20–25, 15–8)	758	11–7 (3–2)
3/31; 7 p.m.	CSUN*	#9	RIMAC Arena; La Jolla, CA	ESPN+	L 0–3 (23–25, 21–25, 19–25).	693	11–8 (3–3)
4/2; 7 p.m.	@ CSUN*	#9	Matadome; Northridge, CA	ESPN+	W 3–0 (25–19, 32–30, 25–22)	201	12–8 (4–3)
4/8; 7 p.m.	@ #2 Long Beach State*	#10	Walter Pyramid; Long Beach, CA	ESPN+	L 0–3 (29–31, 18–25, 12–25)	1,226	12–9 (4–4)
4/9; 7 p.m.	#2 Long Beach State	#10	RIMAC Arena; La Jolla, CA	ESPN+	W 3–2 (16–25, 25–19, 25–20, 21–25, 15–12)	888	13–9 (5–4)
4/16; 7 p.m.	#6 UC Santa Barbara*	#9	RIMAC Arena; La Jolla, CA	ESPN+	L 1–3 (22–25, 25–18, 22–25, 14–25)	1,069	13–10 (5–5)
4/21; 7:30 p.m.	#14 UC Irvine	#9	Stan Sheriff Center; Manoa, HI (Big West Tournament)	ESPN+	L 0–3 (23–25, 20–25, 28–30)	3,521	13–11

*-Indicates conference match.
Times listed are Pacific Time Zone.

== Rankings ==
Ranking movements Legend: ██ Increase in ranking ██ Decrease in ranking — = Not ranked RV = Received votes
	Week																	
Poll	Pre	1	2	3	4	5	6	7	8	9	10	11	12	13	14	15	16	Final
AVCA Coaches	10	10	8	12	13	14	11	11	10	10	10	10	9	10	9	9	10	10
Off the Block Media	Not released	RV	9	RV	—	—	10	9	10	8	10	10	8	RV	8	9	^	9

^The Media did not release a Pre-season poll or a Post-Conference Tournament poll.
