= 2022 Concordia Eagles men's volleyball team =

American college volleyball season

2022 Concordia Eagles men's volleyball
- Conference: Mountain Pacific Sports Federation
- Record: 10–16 (3–9 MPSF)
- Head coach: Riley Salmon (1st season)
- Assistant coach: Casey Hiller (1st season)
- Home arena: CU Arena

The 2022 Concordia Eagles men's volleyball team represented Concordia University Irvine in the 2022 NCAA Division I & II men's volleyball season. The Eagles, led by first year head coach Riley Salmon, played their home games at CU Arena. The Eagles were members of the MPSF and were picked to finish seventh in the MPSF preseason poll. The Eagles tied with BYU for the worst in the league, but due to BYU winning the tiebreaker Concordia finished seventh and fell to USC in the MPSF Tournament 1st Round.

2022 Mountain Pacific Sports Federation volleyball standings
	Conf.				Overall
Team	W		L	PCT	W		L	PCT
No. 4 UCLA ‍†‍‍^{y}	11	–	1	.917	22	–	5	.815
No. 7 USC ‍‍‍	8	–	4	.667	22	–	7	.759
No. 5 Pepperdine ‍‍‡‍^{y}	7	–	5	.583	19	–	10	.655
No. 11 Grand Canyon ‍‍‍	6	–	6	.500	16	–	12	.571
No. 9 Stanford ‍‍‍	4	–	8	.333	14	–	14	.500
Concordia Irvine ‍‍‍	3	–	9	.250	10	–	16	.385
BYU ‍‍‍	3	–	9	.250	8	–	17	.320
† – Conference champion ‡ – 2022 MPSF Tournament champion y- Invited to the NCAA Volleyball Tournament; Rankings from AVCA

== Roster ==
2022 Concordia Eagles roster
Defensive specialist/libero: 4 Danny Smithers - Freshman; 8 Kawika Simon - Junior; 32 Cruse Ae'a - (redshirt) Freshman; Middle blockers: 1 Max McCullough - Freshman; 2 Gil Herold - Junior; 9 Owen Chun - Graduate; 12 Mason Mullins - (redshirt) Junior	Outside hitters: 3 Devyn Zavala - (redshirt) Sophomore; 11 Kobe Kiley - Freshman; 14 Slater Fuhrman - Freshman; 15 Logan Glave - Graduate; 18 Erik Boisvert - Senior; 20 Liam Roberts - (redshirt) Freshman; 21 Keegan Carey - (redshirt) Junior; 22 Jonathan Carlson - Graduate; 31 Jabes De La Cruz - Freshman	Opposite hitters: 3 Devyn Zavala - (redshirt) Sophomore; 9 Owen Chun - Graduate; 20 Liam Roberts - (redshirt) Freshman; 25 Will Migdal - (redshirt) Freshman; 35 Uriel Batista - Junior; Setters: 5 Christian Oviedo - Junior; 6 Mclain Mott - Junior; 7 Makai Lipson - Freshman; 34 Christos Gkitersos - Junior

== Schedule ==
TV/Internet Streaming information:

All home games will be streamed on EagleEye streaming page, powered by Stretch Internet. Most road games will also be streamed by the schools streaming service. The conference tournament will be streamed by FloVolleyball.

Date time	Opponent	Rank^{(tournament seed)}	Arena city (tournament)	Television	Score	Attendance	Record (MPSF record)
1/6; 8 p.m.	vs. CSUN		Robertson Gymnasium; Santa Barbara, CA (UCSB Asics Tournament)	Cancelled- COVID-19			
1/7; 3 p.m.	@ #11 UC Santa Barbara		Robertson Gymnasium; Santa Barbara, CA (UCSB Asics Tournament)	Cancelled- COVID-19			
1/8; 5:30 p.m.	vs. #10 UC San Diego		Robertson Gymnasium; Santa Barbara, CA (UCSB Asics Tournament)	Cancelled- COVID-19			
1/10; 7 p.m.	Saint Xavier		CU Arena; Irvine, CA	EagleEye	W 3–1 (25–21, 19–25, 25–19, 25–22)	25	1–0
1/13; 7 p.m.	Saint Katherine		CU Arena; Irvine, CA	EagleEye	W 3–0 (25–14, 25–19, 25–13)	35	2–0
1/22; 7 p.m.	Master's		CU Arena; Irvine, CA	EagleEye	W 3–0 (25–15, 25–22, 25–19)	40	3–0
1/28; 6 p.m.	@ Saint Katherine		USK Sports Complex; San Marcos, CA	SK Athletics	W 3–0 (25–12, 25–17, 25–17)	0	4–0
2/4; 7 p.m.	@ #13 UC San Diego		RIMAC Arena; La Jolla, CA	ESPN+	W 3–1 (25–22, 18–25, 26–24, 25–20)	0	5–0
2/18; 7 p.m.	@ UC Irvine		Bren Events Center; Irvine, CA	ESPN+	L 0–3 (22–25, 22–25, 25–27)	591	5–1
2/19; 7 p.m.	@ #11 UC San Diego		RIMAC Arena; La Jolla, CA	ESPN+	L 0–3 (23–25, 20–25, 20–25)	231	5–2
2/21; 7 p.m.	Central State		CU Arena; Irvine, CA	EagleEye	Cancelled		
2/23; 7 p.m.	@ #1 UCLA*		Pauley Pavilion; Los Angeles, CA	P12+ UCLA	L 1–3 (21–25, 16–25, 25–20, 18–25)	728	5–3 (0–1)
2/25; 7 p.m.	#1 UCLA*		CU Arena; Irvine, CA	EagleEye	L 0–3 (13–25, 20–25, 15–25)	111	5–4 (0–2)
3/1; 7 p.m.	@ Vanguard		Lions Arena; Costa Mesa, CA	Vanguard Lions Live	W 3–1 (25–19, 27–29, 25–22, 25–20)	0	6–4
3/3; 7 p.m.	#14 Stanford*		CU Arena; Irvine, CA	EagleEye	W 3–2 (25–20, 25–21, 18–25, 21–25, 15–13)	77	7–4 (1–2)
3/4; 7 p.m.	#14 Stanford*		CU Arena; Irvine, CA	EagleEye	W 3–1 (25–22, 22–25, 27–25, 25–20)	81	8–4 (2–2)
3/5; 7 p.m.	UC Irvine		CU Arena; Irvine, CA	EagleEye	L 2–3 (18–25, 25–22, 20–25, 26–24, 10–15)	105	8–5
3/10; 7 p.m.	UC San Diego		CU Arena; Irvine, CA	EagleEye	L 1–3 (25–20, 19–25, 26–28, 28–30)	83	8–6
3/11; 6 p.m.	@ BYU*		Smith Fieldhouse; Provo, UT	BYUtv	L 0–3 (16–25, 14–25, 17–25)	3,069	8–7 (2–3)
3/12; 6 p.m.	@ BYU*		Smith Fieldhouse; Provo, UT	BYUtv	L 1–3 (25–19, 21–25, 18–25, 22–25)	3,041	8–8 (2–4)
3/17; 7 p.m.	Ottawa (KS)		CU Arena; Irvine, CA	EagleEye	W 3–0 (25–16, 25–12, 25–22)	112	9–8
3/18; 7 p.m.	@ #3 Long Beach State		Walter Pyramid; Long Beach, CA	ESPN+	L 0–3 (20–25, 17–25, 25–27)	1,114	9–9
3/25; 7 p.m.	#9 Grand Canyon*		CU Arena; Irvine, CA	EagleEye	W 3–0 (25–21, 36–34, 25–23)	155	10–9 (3–4)
3/26; 7 p.m.	#9 Grand Canyon*		CU Arena; Irvine, CA	EagleEye	L 1–3 (25–18, 20–25, 23–25, 21–25)	230	10–10 (3–5)
3/31; 7 p.m.	#8 Pepperdine*		CU Arena; Irvine, CA	EagleEye	L 0–3 (21–25, 25–27, 23–25)	101	10–11 (3–6)
4/2; 6 p.m.	@ #8 Pepperdine*		Firestone Fieldhouse; Malibu, CA	WaveCasts	L 0–3 (17–25, 17–25, 22–25)	475	10–12 (3–7)
4/8; 7 p.m.	@ #6 USC*		Galen Center; Los Angeles, CA	P12+ USC	L 0–3 (20–25, 23–25, 18–25)	347	10–13 (3–8)
4/9; 7 p.m.	#6 USC*		CU Arena; Irvine, CA	EagleEye	L 0–3 (23–25, 20–25, 31–33)	91	10–14 (3–9)
4/15; 7 p.m.	#6 UC Santa Barbara		CU Arena; Irvine, CA	EagleEye	L 0–3 (23–25, 22–25, 21–25)	77	10–15
4/20; 2 p.m.	#5 USC^{(2)}	^{(7)}	Pauley Pavilion; Los Angeles, CA (MPSF Quarterfinal)	FloVolleyball	L 0–3 (19–25, 22–25, 19–25)	250	10–16

*-Indicates conference match.
Times listed are Pacific Time Zone.

== Announcers for televised games ==
- Saint Xavier: Jeff Runyan & Patience O'Neal
- Saint Katherine: Jeff Runyan & Patience O'Neal
- The Master's: Jeff Runyan & Valerie Pedersen
- Saint Katherine: No commentary
- UC San Diego: Bryan Fenley & Ricci Luyties
- UC Irvine: Rob Espero & Charlie Brande
- UC San Diego: Bryan Fenley & Ricci Luyties
- UCLA: Denny Cline
- UCLA: Patience O'Neal
- Vanguard: No commentary
- Stanford: Patience O'Neal
- Stanford: Patience O'Neal
- UC Irvine: Patience O'Neal
- UC San Diego: Patience O'Neal
- BYU: Jarom Jordan, Steve Vail & Kiki Solano
- BYU: Jarom Jordan, Steve Vail, & Kiki Solano
- Ottawa: Patience O'Neal
- Long Beach State: Matt Brown & Matt Prosser
- Grand Canyon: Ben Rose & Ron J. Ruhman
- Grand Canyon: Patience O'Neal
- Pepperdine: Patience O'Neal
- Pepperdine: Al Epstein
- USC: Mark Beltran & Paul Duchesne
- USC: Kienan Dixon
- UC Santa Barbara: Patience O'Neal
- MPSF Quarterfinal- USC: Nick Kopp
