= 2022 UC Santa Barbara Gauchos men's volleyball team =

2022 UC Santa Barbara Gauchos men's volleyball
- Conference: Big West Conference
- Record: 19–9 (6–4 Big West)
- Head coach: Rick McLaughlin (14th season)
- Assistant coaches: Blaine Nielsen (3rd season); Jonah Seif (3rd season)
- Home arena: Robertson Gymnasium; The Thunderdome

2022 Big West Conference men's volleyball standings
	Conf.				Overall
Team	W		L	PCT	W		L	PCT
No. 2 Long Beach State ‍†‍‍^{y}	8	–	2	.800	21	–	6	.778
No. 1 Hawaii ‍‍‡‍^{y}	7	–	3	.700	27	–	5	.844
No. 8 UC Santa Barbara ‍‍‍	6	–	4	.600	19	–	9	.679
No. 10 UC San Diego ‍‍‍	5	–	5	.500	13	–	11	.542
No. 13 UC Irvine ‍‍‍	3	–	7	.300	10	–	15	.400
Cal State Northridge ‍‍‍	1	–	9	.100	6	–	15	.286
† – Conference champion ‡ – Big West tournament champion y – Invited to the NCAA tournament Rankings from AVCA

The 2022 UC Santa Barbara Gauchos men's volleyball team represented University of California, Santa Barbara in the 2022 NCAA Division I & II men's volleyball season. The Gauchos, led by fourteenth year head coach Rick McLaughlin, split their home games between Robertson Gymnasium and The Thunderdome. The Gauchos competed as members of the Big West Conference and were picked as one of two teams to finish fourth in the Big West preseason poll.

== Roster ==
2022 UC Santa Barbara Gauchos roster
Defensive specialist/libero: 1 Jaden Glenn - Sophomore; 8 Ryan Pecsok - Sophomore; 19 Max Gordon - Freshman; Middle blockers: 6 Donovan Todorov - Sophomore; 10 Brandon Hicks - Junior; 15 Dain Johnson - Sophomore; 20 Reece Francke - Sophomore; 24 Rhys Tracy - Sophomore	Outside hitters: 3 Owen Birg - Freshman; 5 Ben Coordt - Freshman; 9 Ryan Wilcox - Junior; 12 Dayne Chalmers - Sophomore; 13 Ethan Young - Sophomore; 14 Andrew Reavis - Sophomore; 17 Andrew McSweeney - Sophomore; 19 Max Gordon - Freshman; 21 Nick Amoruso - Sophomore; 22 Max Cajuste - Sophomore; 23 Sam Collins - Sophomore; 25 Dominic Lang - Sophomore; 30 Sam Meister - Freshman	Opposite hitters: 2 Geste Bianchi - Freshman; 3 Owen Birg - Freshman; 4 Rees Barnett - Sophomore; 7 Haotian Xia - Junior; 21 Nick Amoruso - Sophomore; 30 Sam Meister - Freshman; 31 Spencer Olivier - (redshirt) Junior; Setters: 1 Jaden Glenn - Sophomore; 16 Conor Dunn - Sophomore; 18 Patrick Paragas - Sophomore; 28 Greg Baglio - Freshman

== Schedule ==
TV/Internet Streaming/Radio information:

ESPN+ will carry most home and all conference road games. All other road broadcasts will be carried by the schools respective streaming partner.

Date time	Opponent	Rank	Arena city (tournament)	Television	Score	Attendance	Record (Big West Record)
1/6; 3 p.m.	USC	#11	Robertson Gymnasium; Santa Barbara, CA (UCSB Asics Invitational)	ESPN+	L 2–3 (25–19, 22–25, 25–17, 23–25, 8–15)	1	0–1
1/7; 3 p.m.	USC	#11	Robertson Gymnasium; Santa Barbara, CA (UCSB Asics Invitational)	ESPN+	L 1–3 (25–20, 17–25, 18–25, 22–25)	1	0–2
1/8; 3 p.m.	#10 UC San Diego	#11	Robertson Gymnasium; Santa Barbara, CA		Cancelled- COVID-19		
1/11; 3 p.m.	Saint Xavier		Robertson Gymnasium; Santa Barbara, CA	ESPN+	W 3–0 (25–20, 25–18, 25–17)	1	1–2
1/19; 5 p.m.	Princeton		The Thunderdome; Isla Vista, CA	ESPN+	L 1–3 (25–22, 18–25, 29–31, 13–25)	1	1–3
1/21; 5:30 p.m.	@ #4 Pepperdine		Firestone Fieldhouse; Malibu, CA	WaveCasts	W 3–2 (24–26, 25–21, 25–22, 21–25, 15–7)	825	2–3
1/28; 6 p.m.	#4 Penn State		The Thunderdome; Isla Vista, CA (Battle of the Bigs)	ESPN+	W 3–0 (25–13, 25–21, 25–21)	111	3–3
1/29; 7 p.m.	#9 Ohio State		The Thunderdome; Isla Vista, CA (Battle of the Bigs)	ESPN+	W 3–1 (25–19, 25–18, 26–28, 25–17)	176	4–3
2/4; 5 p.m.	#2 Pepperdine	#11	The Thunderdome; Isla Vista, CA	ESPN+	W 3–1 (26–24, 25–19, 23–25, 25–15)	125	5–3
2/9; 7 p.m.	@ #7 USC	#8	Galen Center; Los Angeles, CA	P12 LA	L 0–3 (20–25, 22–25, 23–25)	303	5–4
2/11; 7 p.m.	@ #9 Grand Canyon	#8	GCU Arena; Phoenix, AZ	ESPN+	W 3–2 (22–25, 25–23, 25–21, 14–25, 20–18)	692	6–4
2/12; 7 p.m.	@ #9 Grand Canyon	#8	GCU Arena; Phoenix, AZ	ESPN+	W 3–2 (21–25, 25–12, 25–23, 20–25, 15–12)	604	7–4
2/18; 7 p.m.	#13 BYU	#6	The Thunderdome; Isla Vista, CA	ESPN+	W 3–0 (25–21, 25–18, 25–23)	100	8–4
2/19; 7 p.m.	#13 BYU	#6	Robertson Gymnasium; Santa Barbara, CA		W 3–1 (25–22, 28–26, 26–28, 26–24)	125	9–4
2/24; 7 p.m.	#11 UC San Diego*	#6	The Thunderdome; Isla Vista, CA	ESPN+	W 3–1 (25–20, 23–25, 25–19, 25–21)	272	10–4 (1–0)
3/3; 7 p.m.	Cal Lutheran	#5	Robertson Gymnasium; Santa Barbara, CA	UCSB SN on Stretch	W 3–0 (25–20, 25–17, 25–10)	85	11–4
3/4; 7 p.m.	LIU	#5	Robertson Gymnasium; Santa Barbara, CA	UCSB SN on Stretch	W 3–0 (25–13, 25–22, 25–13)	100	12–4
3/10; 7 p.m.	CSUN*	#5	The Thunderdome; Isla Vista, CA	ESPN+	W 3–0 (25–18, 25–17, 25–17)	212	13–4 (2–0)
3/11; 7 p.m.	@ CSUN*	#5	Matadome; Northridge, CA	ESPN+	W 3–0 (25–20, 25–17, 25–23)	286	14–4 (3–0)
3/25; 7 p.m.	#3 Long Beach State*	#6	The Thunderdome; Isla Vista, CA	ESPN+	L 1–3 (25–22, 19–25, 16–25, 19–25)	1,386	14–5 (3–1)
3/26; 7 p.m.	@ #3 Long Beach State*	#6	Walter Pyramid; Long Beach, CA	ESPN+	L 0–3 (21–25, 24–26, 22–25)	342	14–6 (3–2)
3/30; 7 p.m.	@ #14 UC Irvine*	#6	Bren Events Center; Irvine, CA	ESPN+	W 3–1 (25–19, 25–18, 26–28, 25–22)	558	15–6 (4–2)
4/1; 7 p.m.	#14 UC Irvine*	#6	The Thunderdome; Isla Vista, CA	ESPN+	W 3–0 (26–24, 25–19, 25–20)	100	16–6 (5–2)
4/8; 10 p.m.	@ #4 Hawai'i*	#5	Stan Sheriff Center; Manoa, HI	ESPN+	L 0–3 (16–25, 23–25, 26–28)	4,960	16–7 (5–3)
4/9; 10 p.m.	@ #4 Hawai'i*	#5	Stan Sheriff Center; Manoa, HI	ESPN+	L 2–3 (25–19, 20–25, 26–24, 18–25, 10–15)	6,744	16–8 (5–4)
4/15; 7 p.m.	@ Concordia Irvine	#6	CU Arena; Irvine, CA	EagleEye	W 3–0 (25–23, 25–22, 25–21)	77	17–8
4/16; 7 p.m.	@ #9 UC San Diego*	#6	RIMAC; La Jolla, CA	ESPN+	W 3–1 (25–22, 18–25, 25–22, 25–14)	1,069	18–8 (6–4)
4/21; 9 p.m.	vs. CSUN^{(6)}	#6^{(3)}	Stan Sheriff Center; Manoa, HI (Big West 1st Round)	ESPN+	W 3–0 (25–19, 26–24, 26–24)	3,521	19–8
4/22; 9 p.m.	@ #4 Hawai'i^{(2)}	#6^{(3)}	Stan Sheriff Center; Manoa, HI (Big West Semifinal)	ESPN+	L 0–3 (18–25, 24–26, 14–25)	5,238	19–9

*-Indicates conference match.
Times listed are Pacific Time Zone.

== Rankings ==
Ranking movements Legend: ██ Increase in ranking ██ Decrease in ranking — = Not ranked RV = Received votes
	Week																	
Poll	Pre	1	2	3	4	5	6	7	8	9	10	11	12	13	14	15	16	Final
AVCA Coaches	11	RV	RV	RV	11	8	6	6	5	5	5	5	6	6	5	6	6	6
Off the Block Media	Not released	RV	—	—	9	8	7	6	6	4	7	7	6	7	7	7	^	8

^The Media did not release a Pre-season or Post-Conference Tournament poll.
