= 2022 Eastern Intercollegiate Volleyball Association tournament =

Volleyball Tournament

2022 Eastern Intercollegiate Volleyball Association Men's Volleyball Tournament
- Classification: Division I/II
- Teams: 6
- Site: Rec Hall; University Park, PA
- Champions: Princeton (3rd title)
- Eastern Intercollegiate Volleyball Association Men's Volleyball Tournaments

The 2022 Eastern Intercollegiate Volleyball Association Tournament was a men's volleyball tournament for the Eastern Intercollegiate Volleyball Association during the 2022 NCAA Division I & II men's volleyball season. It was held April 20 through April 23, 2022 at the #1 seed's court. The winner received the EIVA's automatic bid to the 2022 NCAA Volleyball Tournament.

2022 Eastern Intercollegiate Volleyball Association standings
	Conf.				Overall
Team	W		L	PCT	W		L	PCT
No. 6 Penn State ‍†‍‍	16	–	0	1.000	23	–	4	.852
NJIT ‍‍‍	10	–	6	.625	17	–	10	.630
Harvard ‍‍‍	10	–	6	.625	12	–	13	.480
Princeton ‍‍‡‍^{y}	10	–	6	.625	16	–	12	.571
Saint Francis ‍‍‍	8	–	8	.500	15	–	13	.536
George Mason ‍‍‍	7	–	9	.438	13	–	15	.464
Charleston (WV) ‍‍‍	5	–	11	.313	9	–	14	.391
St. Francis Brooklyn ‍‍‍	4	–	12	.250	10	–	15	.400
Sacred Heart ‍‍‍	2	–	14	.125	10	–	17	.370
† – Conference champion ‡ – EIVA tournament champion y – Invited to the NCAA tournament Rankings from AVCA

== Seeds ==
The EIVA continued to use its 2021 format in 2022. However, only the top six schools participated in the tournament. Seeds 1 and 2 received byes to the semifinals, while Seed 3 played Seed 6 and Seed 4 played Seed 5 in the conference tournament opening round. All matches were held at Rec Hall in University Park, Pennsylvania, home court of top seed Penn State.

Seedings and placement were determined by win percentage should teams not have played every match. Tiebreaker procedures were as follows:

- Head-to-head match record
- Head-to-head sets won against each other
- Head-to-head points amongst the tied teams
- Sets winning percentage within the conference
- Points against teams within the conference
- Coin toss by the EIVA Commissioner

Seed	School	Conference	Tiebreaker
1	Penn State	16–0	–
2	Harvard	10–6	1–1 vs. NJIT, 2–0 vs. Princeton (3–1)
3	NJIT	10–6	1–1 vs. Harvard, 1–1 vs. Princeton (2–2)
4	Princeton	10–6	0–2 vs. Harvard, 1–1 vs. NJIT (1–3)
5	St. Francis (PA)	8–8	–
6	George Mason	7–9	–
7	Charleston (WV)	5–11	DID NOT QUALIFY
8	St. Francis Brooklyn	4–12	DID NOT QUALIFY
9	Sacred Heart	2–14	DID NOT QUALIFY

== Schedule and results ==
Time Network	Matchup	Score	Attendance	Broadcasters	Report
Quarterfinals – Wednesday, April 20
4:30 p.m. B1G+	No. 3 NJIT vs. No. 6 George Mason	3–1 (34–32, 25–20, 21–25, 25–21)	323	Adam Sheetz & Logan Bourandus	Recap
7 p.m. B1G+	No. 4 Princeton vs. No. 5 St. Francis (PA)	3–0 (25–21, 25–21, 25–23)	323	Adam Sheetz & Logan Bourandus	Recap
Semifinals – Thursday, April 21
4:30 p.m. B1G+	No. 2 Harvard vs. No. 3 NJIT	1–3 (25–17, 21–25, 18–25, 22–25)	722	Matt Scalzo & Alex Rocco	Recap
7 p.m. B1G+	No. 1 Penn State vs. No. 4 Princeton	2–3 (16–25, 26–28, 25–23, 25–17, 12–15)	722	Matt Scalzo & Alex Rocco	Recap
Championship – Saturday, April 23
7:00 p.m. B1G+	No. 3 NJIT vs. No. 4 Princeton	1–3 (25–23, 25–27, 25–27, 18–25)	420	Jacob Cheris & Logan Bourandus	
Game times are Eastern Time. Rankings denote tournament seeding.

== Bracket ==
Quarterfinals; Wednesday, April 20
4	Princeton	3
5	Charleston	0
3	NJIT	3
6	George Mason	1

Semifinals; Thursday, April 21
1	Penn State	2
4	Princeton	3
2	Harvard	1
3	NJIT	3

Championship; Saturday, April 23
4	Princeton	3
3	NJIT	1
