= 2022 Pepperdine Waves men's volleyball team =

American college volleyball season

2022 Pepperdine Waves men's volleyball

MPSF Tournament Champions

NCAA Tournament, 5th place
- Conference: Mountain Pacific Sports Federation
- Record: 19-10 (7-5 MPSF)
- Head coach: David Hunt (5th season)
- Assistant coaches: Paul Carroll (3rd season); Matthew Pollock (3rd season)
- Home arena: Firestone Fieldhouse

The 2022 Pepperdine Waves men's volleyball team represented Pepperdine University in the 2022 NCAA Division I & II men's volleyball season. The Waves, led by fifth year head coach David Hunt, played their home games at Firestone Fieldhouse. The Waves were members of the MPSF and were picked to win in the preseason poll.

2022 Mountain Pacific Sports Federation men's volleyball standings
	Conf.				Overall
Team	W		L	PCT	W		L	PCT
No. 4 UCLA ‍†‍‍^{y}	11	–	1	.917	22	–	5	.815
No. 7 USC ‍‍‍	8	–	4	.667	22	–	7	.759
No. 5 Pepperdine ‍‍‡‍^{y}	7	–	5	.583	19	–	10	.655
No. 11 Grand Canyon ‍‍‍	6	–	6	.500	16	–	12	.571
No. 9 Stanford ‍‍‍	4	–	8	.333	14	–	14	.500
Concordia Irvine ‍‍‍	3	–	9	.250	10	–	16	.385
BYU ‍‍‍	3	–	9	.250	8	–	17	.320
† – Conference champion ‡ – MPSF tournament champion y – Invited to the NCAA tournament Rankings from AVCA

== Roster ==
2022 Pepperdine Waves roster
Defensive specialist/libero: 3 Trey Cole - Sophomore; 27 Yadiel Diaz - Freshman; 28 Brendan Read - Freshman; Middle blockers: 2 Keeton Hanzlik-Green - Freshman; 5 Andersen Fuller - Sophomore; 8 Nick Tidik - Freshman; 11 JT Martin - Senior; 20 Austin Wilmot - Graduate; 21 Mike Scott - (redshirt) Sophomore; 22 Ryan Wheeler - (redshirt) Sophomore; 24 JT Ardell - Senior	Outside hitters: 4 Ben Weinberg - Senior; 7 Spencer Wickens - Graduate; 9 Kevin Roberts - Freshman; 14 Alex Gettinger - Graduate; 15 Joe Deluzio - (redshirt) Freshman; 19 Cole Rasic - (redshirt) Freshman; 23 Jalen Jasper - Graduate; 25 Akin Akinwumi - Junior	Opposite hitters: 1 Scott Solan - Sophomore; 10 Auden McCaw - (redshirt) Freshman; 12 Jacob Steele - (redshirt) Sophomore; 16 Eli Crane - (redshirt) Freshman; 17 Mason Tyler - (redshirt) Senior; 26 Tal Ritters - Freshman; Setters: 6 Bryce Dvorak - Freshman; 10 Auden McCaw - (redshirt) Freshman; 18 Joe Karlous - Junior; 26 Tal Ritters - Freshman

== Schedule ==
TV/Internet Streaming information:

All home games will be televised on WaveCasts. All road games will also be streamed by the schools tv or streaming service. The conference tournament will be streamed by FloVolleyball.

Date time	Opponent	Rank^{(tournament seed)}	Arena city (tournament)	Television	Score	Attendance	Record (MPSF record)
1/5; 2 p.m.	@ Mount Olive	#3	Kornegay Arena; Mount Olive, NC	Conference Carolinas DN	Cancelled- COVID-19		
1/6; 2 p.m.	@ Mount Olive	#3	Kornegay Arena; Mount Olive, NC	Conference Carolinas DN	Cancelled- COVID-19		
1/7; 4 p.m.	@ Barton	#3	Wilson Gymnasium; Wilson, NC	Conference Carolinas DN	Cancelled- COVID-19		
1/8; 4 p.m.	@ Barton	#3	Wilson Gymn; Wilson, NC	Conference Carolinas DN	Cancelled- COVID-19		
1/13; 9 a.m.	Erskine	#3	Firestone Fieldhouse; Malibu, CA	WaveCasts	W 3–0 (25–9, 25–19, 25–15)	115	1–0
1/14; 4 p.m.	Erskine	#3	Firestone Fieldhouse; Malibu, CA	WaveCasts	W 3–0 (25–17, 25–16, 25–16)	228	2–0
1/17; 7 p.m.	Princeton	#4	Firestone Fieldhouse; Malibu, CA	WaveCasts	W 3–0 (25–21, 25–20, 25–20)	312	3–0
1/21; 7 p.m.	UC Santa Barbara	#4	Firestone Fieldhouse; Malibu, CA	WaveCasts	L 2–3 (26–24, 21–25, 22–25, 25–21, 7–15)	825	3–1
1/28; 7 p.m.	Lewis	#5	Firestone Fieldhouse; Malibu, CA	WaveCasts	W 3–0 (25–19, 25–20, 25–21)	476	4–1
2/4; 5 p.m.	@ #11 UC Santa Barbara	#2	The Thunderdome; Isla Vista, CA	ESPN+	L 1–3 (24–26, 19–25, 25–23, 15–25)	125	4–2
2/9; 7 p.m.	@ UC Irvine	#5	Firestone Fieldhouse; Malibu, CA	WaveCasts	W 3–0 (25–21, 25–17, 27–25)	375	5–2
2/11; 7 p.m.	UC Irvine	#5	Firestone Fieldhouse; Malibu, CA	WaveCasts	L 1–3 (25–13, 21–25, 21–25, 24–24)	652	5–3
2/18; 5 p.m.	@ #10 Grand Canyon*	#8	GCU Arena; Phoenix, AZ	ESPN+	W 3–1 (40–42, 25–18, 25–19, 25–20)	635	6–3 (1–0)
2/20; 1 p.m.	@ #10 Grand Canyon*	#8	GCU Arena; Phoenix, AZ	ESPN+	L 1–3 (21–25, 24–26, 25–19, 13–25)	521	6–4 (1–1)
2/23; 7 p.m.	#5 USC*	#7	Firestone Fieldhouse; Malibu, CA	WaveCasts	W 3–2 (23–25, 25–17, 28–26, 24–26, 15–13)	443	7–4 (2–1)
2/25; 7 p.m.	@ #5 USC*	#7	Galen Center; Los Angeles, CA	P12+ USC	L 1–3 (25–22, 23–25, 19–25, 20–25)	813	7–5 (2–2)
3/4; 5 p.m.	@ McKendree	#7	Melvin Price Convocation Center; Lebanon, IL	GLVC SN	W 3–0 (25–18, 25–22, 25–20)	390	8–5
3/5; 5 p.m.	@ McKendree	#7	Melvin Price Convocation Center; Lebanon, IL	GLVC SN	L 2–3 (21–25, 22–25, 25–22, 25–23, 11–15)	450	8–6
3/11; 5 p.m.	George Mason	#7	Firestone Fieldhouse; Malibu, CA	WaveCasts	W 3–0 (25–18, 25–14, 25–17)	515	9–6
3/16; 7 p.m.	CSUN	#7	Firestone Fieldhouse; Malibu, CA	WaveCasts	W 3–0 (25–16, 25–21, 25–20)	376	10–6
3/18; 7 p.m.	@ CSUN	#7	Matadome; Northridge, CA	ESPN+	W 3–0 (25–13, 25–8, 25–21)	210	11–6
3/25; 6 p.m.	BYU*	#7	Firestone Fieldhouse; Malibu, CA	WaveCasts	L 2–3 (30–32, 25–21, 25–20, 29–31, 9–15)	705	11–7 (2–3)
3/26; 6 p.m.	BYU*	#7	Firestone Fieldhouse; Malibu, CA	WaveCasts	W 3–0 (25–22, 25–21, 25–19)	682	12–7 (3–3)
3/31; 7 p.m.	@ Concordia Irvine*	#8	CU Arena; Irvine, CA	EagleEye	W 3–0 (25–21, 27–25, 25–23)	101	13–7 (4–3)
4/2; 6 p.m.	Concordia Irvine*	#8	Firestone Fieldhouse; Malibu, CA	WaveCasts	W 3–0 (25–17, 25–17, 25–22)	475	14–7 (5–3)
4/7; 7 p.m.	#1 UCLA*	#8	Firestone Fieldhouse; Malibu, CA	WaveCasts	L 0–3 (19–25, 28–30, 22–25)	941	14–8 (5–4)
4/9; 6 p.m.	@ #1 UCLA*	#8	Pauley Pavilion; Los Angeles, CA	P12 LA	L 0–3 (23–25, 19–25, 19–25)	2,942	14–9 (5–5)
4/14; 6 p.m.	#12 Stanford*	#8	Firestone Fieldhouse; Malibu, CA	WaveCasts	W 3–0 (25–18, 25–10, 25–19)	515	15–9 (6–5)
4/16; 6 p.m.	#12 Stanford*	#8	Firestone Fieldhouse; Malibu, CA	WaveCasts	W 3–2 (25–21, 25–21, 13–25, 23–25, 15–11)	535	16–9 (7–5)
4/20; 5 p.m.	vs. BYU^{(6)}	#8^{(3)}	Pauley Pavilion; Los Angeles, CA (MPSF Quarterfinal)	FloVolleyball	W 3–2 (25–22, 25–20, 23–25, 21–25, 16–14)	450	17–9
4/21; 7 p.m.	vs. #5 USC^{(2)}	#8^{(3)}	Pauley Pavilion; Los Angeles, CA (MPSF Semifinal)	FloVolleyball	W 3–1 (25–23, 28–26, 20–25, 27–25)	850	18–9
4/23; 6 p.m.	vs. #13 Stanford^{(5)}	#8^{(3)}	Pauley Pavilion; Los Angeles, CA (MPSF Championship)	FloVolleyball	W 3–2 (25–20, 25–19, 22–25, 22–25, 15–12)	1,163	19–9

*-Indicates conference match. (#)-Indicates tournament seeding.
Times listed are Pacific Time Zone.

== Announcers for televised games ==
- Erskine: Al Epstein
- Erskine: Al Epstein
- Princeton: Al Epstein
- UC Santa Barbara: Al Epstein
- Lewis: Al Epstein
- UC Santa Barbara: Max Kelton & Katie Spieler
- UC Irvine: Al Epstein
- UC Irvine: Rob Espero & Charlie Brande
- Grand Canyon: Diana Johnson & Houston Boe
- Grand Canyon: Diana Johnson & Amanda Roach
- USC: Al Epstein
- USC: Anne Marie Anderson
- McKendree: Colin Suhre
- McKendree: Colin Suhre
- George Mason: Al Epstein
- CSUN: Al Epstein
- CSUN: Darren Preston
- BYU: Al Epstein
- BYU: Al Epstein
- Concordia Irvine: Patience O'Neal
- Concordia Irvine: Al Epstein
- UCLA: Al Epstein
- UCLA: Jim Watson
- Stanford: Al Epstein
- Stanford: Al Epstein
- MPSF Quarterfinal- BYU: Nick Kopp
- MPSF Semifinal- USC: Darren Preston
- MPSF Championship- Stanford: Darren Preston

== Rankings ==
Ranking movements Legend: ██ Increase in ranking ██ Decrease in ranking
	Week																	
Poll	Pre	1	2	3	4	5	6	7	8	9	10	11	12	13	14	15	16	Final
AVCA Coaches	3	3	4	5	2	5	8	7	7	7	7	7	8	8	8	8		
Off the Block Media	Not released	3	4	5	3	6	9	8	8	9	8	8	9	8	10	8		

^The Media did not release a Pre-season poll.
