= 2022 Long Beach State Beach men's volleyball team =

American college volleyball season

2022 Long Beach State men's volleyball
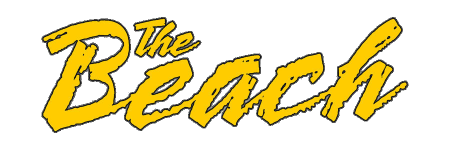

Big West regular season champion

Big West Championship Game, L 0–3 vs. Hawaii

NCAA Championship Game, L 0–3 vs. Hawaii
- Conference: Big West Conference
- Record: 21–6 (8–2 Big West)
- Head coach: Alan Knipe (19th season)
- Assistant coaches: Nick MacRae (10th season); McKay Smith (3rd season)
- Home arena: Walter Pyramid

2022 Big West Conference men's volleyball standings
	Conf.				Overall
Team	W		L	PCT	W		L	PCT
No. 2 Long Beach State ‍†‍‍^{y}	8	–	2	.800	21	–	6	.778
No. 1 Hawaii ‍‍‡‍^{y}	7	–	3	.700	27	–	5	.844
No. 8 UC Santa Barbara ‍‍‍	6	–	4	.600	19	–	9	.679
No. 10 UC San Diego ‍‍‍	5	–	5	.500	13	–	11	.542
No. 13 UC Irvine ‍‍‍	3	–	7	.300	10	–	15	.400
Cal State Northridge ‍‍‍	1	–	9	.100	6	–	15	.286
† – Conference champion ‡ – Big West tournament champion y – Invited to the NCAA tournament Rankings from AVCA

The 2022 Long Beach State Beach men's volleyball team represented Long Beach State University during the 2022 NCAA Division I & II men's volleyball season. Led by head coach Alan Knipe in his nineteenth season, the team played its home games at Walter Pyramid. The Beach competed as members of the Big West Conference and were picked as co-champions in the Big West preseason poll.

== Roster ==
2022 Long Beach State Beach Roster
Defensive Specialist/Libero: 3 Mason Briggs - Sophomore; 22 Caden Jackson - (redshirt) Freshman; Middle Blockers: 1 Shane Holdaway - Junior; 16 Marc Moody - (redshirt) Senior; 18 Nato Dickinson - (redshirt) Freshman; 20 Aidan Grosz - (redshirt) Sophomore; 21 Grant Marocchi - Junior; 24 Noah Robin - (redshirt) Freshman; 25 Matt Iamaleava - (redshirt) Freshman	Outside Hitters: 2 Sebastian Rodriguez - (redshirt) Freshman; 9 Nathan Harlan - Sophomore; 10 Connor Bloom - Freshman; 12 Clarke Godbold - Sophomore; 17 Dane Hillis - Freshman; 23 Alex Nikolov - Freshman; 27 Calvin Sanborn - Junior	Opposite Hitters: 9 Nathan Harlan - Sophomore; 10 Connor Bloom - Freshman; 11 Simon Torwie - Sophomore; 31 Spencer Olivier - (redshirt) Junior; Setters: 5 Aidan Knipe - Sophomore; 6 Josh Rosenblum - Freshman; 26 Eric Beebe - Sophomore

== Schedule ==
TV/Internet Streaming/Radio information:

22 West Media will carry select Long Beach State men's volleyball matches on the radio.
ESPN+ will carry all home and conference road games. All other road broadcasts will be carried by the schools respective streaming partner.

Date Time	Opponent	Rank	Arena City (Tournament)	Television	Score	Attendance	Record (Big West Record)
1/7; 4 p.m.	vs. Juniata	#5	DeGol Arena; Loretta, PA	NEC Front Row	Cancelled- COVID-19		
1/8; 4:30 p.m.	@ St. Francis	#5	DeGol Arena; Loretto, PA	NEC Front Row	Cancelled- COVID-19		
1/15; 7 p.m.	Harvard	#5	Walter Pyramid; Long Beach, CA		W 3–0 (25–18, 25–16, 25–23)	1,230	1–0
1/17; 7 p.m.	Erskine	#5	Walter Pyramid; Long Beach, CA	ESPN+	W 3–0 (25–13, 25–15, 25–11)	753	2–0
1/21; 5 p.m.	@ #7 Lewis	#5	Neil Carey Arena; Romeoville, IL	GLVC SN	W 3–1 (25–22, 25–22, 24–26, 25–20)	50	3–0
1/22; 5:30 p.m.	@ #9 Loyola Chicago	#5	Joseph J. Gentile Arena; Chicago, IL	ESPN+	W 3–0 (25–17, 25–17, 25–22)	706	4–0
1/28; 6 p.m.	#9 Ohio State	#3	Walter Pyramid; Long Beach, CA (Battle of the Bigs)	ESPN+	W 3–0 (24–26, 25–20, 25–15, 25–22)	1,198	5–0
1/29; 7 p.m.	#4 Penn State	#3	Walter Pyramid; Long Beach, CA (Battle of the Bigs)	ESPN+	L 3–2 (27–25, 21–25, 25–20, 23–25, 11–15)	1,288	5–1
2/4; 7 p.m.	#7 USC	#3	Walter Pyramid; Long Beach, CA	ESPN+	W 3–1 (15–25, 25–23, 25–21, 25–19)	1,729	6–1
2/11; 7 p.m.	#2 UCLA	#1	Walter Pyramid; Long Beach, CA	ESPN+	W 3–0 (25–22, 25–23, 25–13)	3,137	7–1
2/19; 7 p.m.	@ #2 UCLA	#1	Pauley Pavilion; Los Angeles, CA	P12+ UCLA	L 2–3 (20–25, 23–25, 25–23, 25–21, 12–15)	2,008	7–2
2/25; 7 p.m.	# 12 Stanford	#2	Walter Pyramid; Long Beach, CA	ESPN+	W 3–0 (25–19, 25–22, 25–18)	1,491	8–2
3/4; 7 p.m.	NJIT	#2	Walter Pyramid; Long Beach, CA	ESPN+	W 3–1 (25–16, 25–20, 23–25, 25–16)	976	9–2
3/5; 7:30 p.m.	LIU	#2	Walter Pyramid; Long Beach, CA	ESPN+	W 3–0 (25–18, 25–14, 25–15)	1,139	10–2
3/10; 7 p.m.	@ UC Irvine*	#2	Bren Events Center; Irvine, CA	ESPN+	L 2–3 (25–19, 25–23, 17–25, 22–25, 12–15)	588	10–3 (0–1)
3/11; 7 p.m.	UC Irvine*	#2	Walter Pyramid; Long Beach, CA	ESPN+	W 3–0 (25–22, 25–18, 25–20)	1,277	11–3 (1–1)
3/18; 7 p.m.	Concordia Irvine	#3	Walter Pyramid; Long Beach, CA	ESPN+	W 3–0 (25–20, 25–17, 27–25)	1,114	12–3
3/25; 7 p.m.	#6 UC Santa Barbara*	#3	Walter Pyramid; Long Beach, CA	ESPN+	W 3–1 (22–25, 25–19, 25–16, 25–19).	1,386	13–3 (2–1)
3/26; 7 p.m.	@ #6 UC Santa Barbara*	#3	The Thunderdome; Isla Vista, CA	ESPN+	W 3–0 (25–21, 26–24, 25–22)	342	14–3 (3–1)
4/1; 7 p.m.	#4 Hawai'i*	#2	Walter Pyramid; Long Beach, CA	ESPN+	W 3–1 (22–25, 25–23, 26–24, 27–25)	2,607	15–3 (4–1)
4/2; 7 p.m.	#4 Hawai'i*	#2	Walter Pyramid; Long Beach, CA	ESPNU	W 3–1 (25–23, 25–20, 21–25, 25–19)	3,014	16–3 (5–1)
4/8; 7 p.m.	#10 UC San Diego*	#2	Walter Pyramid; Long Beach, CA	ESPN+	W 3–0 (31–29, 25–18, 25–12)	1,226	17–3 (6–1)
4/9; 7 p.m.	@ #10 UC San Diego*	#2	RIMAC Arena; La Jolla, CA	ESPN+	L 2–3 (25–16, 19–25, 20–25, 25–21, 12–15)	888	17–4 (6–2)
4/15; 7 p.m.	CSUN*	#3	Walter Pyramid; Long Beach, CA	ESPN+	W 3–2 (25–20, 16–25, 20–25, 25–21, 16–14)	1,310	18–4 (7–2)
4/16; 7 p.m.	@ CSUN*	#3	Matadome; Northridge, CA	ESPN+	3–0 (32–30, 25–23, 25–20)	575	19–4 (8–2)
4/22; 7:30 p.m.	#14 UC Irvine^{(5)}	#3^{(1)}	Stan Sheriff Center; Manoa, HI (Big West Tournament Semifinal)	ESPN+	W 3–1 (22—25, 25–23, 25–19, 29–27)	5,238	20–4
4/23; 10:30 p.m.	#4 Hawai'i^{(2)}	#3^{(1)}	Stan Sheriff Center; Manoa, HI (Big West Tournament Championship)	ESPN+	L 0–3 (25–27, 26–28, 23–25)	6,636	20–5
5/5; 2:00 p.m.	#3 UCLA^{(4)}	#2^{(1)}	Pauley Pavilion; Los Angeles, CA (NCAA Tournament Semifinal)	NCAA.com	W 3–2 (18–25, 18–25, 25–15, 25-10, 16-14)	4,430	21–5
5/7; 5:00 p.m.	#1 Hawai'i^{(3)}	#2^{(1)}	Pauley Pavilion; Los Angeles, CA (NCAA Tournament Championship)	ESPN2	L 0–3 (22–25, 21–25, 20–25)	5,784	21–6

*-Conference Regular Season match.
()-Indicates tournament seed.
Times listed are Pacific Time Zone.

== Rankings ==
Ranking movements Legend: ██ Increase in ranking ██ Decrease in ranking
	Week																		
Poll	Pre	1	2	3	4	5	6	7	8	9	10	11	12	13	14	15	16	17	Final
AVCA Coaches	4	4	5	5	3	3	1	1	2	2	2	3	3	2	2	3	3	2	2
Off the Block Media	Not released	5	5	3	1	1	1	1											

^The Media did not release a Pre-season poll.
