= Ricci Luyties =

American volleyball player

Personal information
- Full name: Ricci Judson Luyties
- Born: May 14, 1962 (age 64); Pacific Palisades, California, U.S.
- Height: 6 ft 5 in (195 cm)
- Education: University of California, Los Angeles

Volleyball information
- Position: Setter
- Number: 9 (national team); 11 (UCLA)

National team
1985–1988	United States
Medal record
Men's volleyball
Representing the United States
Olympic Games
Gold medal – first place	1988 Seoul	Indoor
Goodwill Games
Silver medal – second place	1986 Moscow
Pan American Games
Gold medal – first place	1987 Indianapolis	Indoor

Ricci Judson Luyties (born May 14, 1962) is an American volleyball coach and former volleyball player. As a member of the United States national volleyball team, he won a gold medal at the 1988 Summer Olympics in Seoul. Luyties later became a successful professional beach volleyball player and won seven titles. He was the head women's volleyball coach at the University of California, San Diego.

== Early life ==
Luyties attended Palisades High School from 1976 through 1980. He was the Los Angeles’ Player of the Year. Luyties led his team to the city finals in 1979 and 1980, placing second to Westchester High School.

In the summer of 1980, Luyties joined the Junior National volleyball team and continued to play on it each summer until he joined the United States men's national volleyball team in 1985.

== College ==
Luyties started for the UCLA Bruins from 1981 through 1984. He helped lead UCLA Bruins to four consecutive national titles and three straight league titles. In 1982 and 1984, the Bruins had an undefeated season with the assistance of Luyties. Throughout his career, UCLA won eighty-three straight home games and had an overall record of 126 matches won and seven lost.

In 1983 and 1984, Luyties was awarded All-American honors, was named Volleyball Magazine’s Player of the Year, and was selected as the NCAA Tournament’s Most Outstanding Player. Luyties also received all-conference honors in 1982 through 1984. He was the first men's player to earn back-to-back Player of the Year honors in NCAA history. Luyties was inducted into the UCLA Hall of Fame in 1995, and in 1996 his jersey (11) was retired at Pauley Pavilion.

== National team ==
Luyties was a member of the United States men's national volleyball team from 1985 to 1988, and helped secure a gold medal at the 1988 Summer Olympics as a setter. His jersey number was 9. Luyties was on the team as a backup setter, but took over for Jeff Stork after his injury. The Olympic team was undefeated in seven matches, and included three other UCLA alumni: Karch Kiraly, Steve Salmons, and Dave Saunders.

Luyties was also a member of the national team that won the gold medal in the 1987 Pan American Games in Indianapolis.

== Beach volleyball ==
Luyties played in his first beach tournament at Hermosa Beach, California in July 1983 with Steve Obradovich. Luyties obtained his first win in July 1988 at the AVP tour in Manhattan Beach, California with his partner, Karch Kiraly. In 1991, Luyties tallied four wins on the AVP tour. One was with partner, Mike Dodd, and the other three were with his partner, Adam Johnson. Luyties had two wins with his partner, Brent Frohoff, in 1992 and 1994 at the AVP tour. Throughout his professional beach volleyball career, Luyties totaled seven domestic titles.

== Coaching ==
Luyties was the head coach at La Jolla High School in 1999 and 2000. He was also the coach of the Coast Volleyball Club Girls 16's team, the Wind ‘N Sea Volleyball Club, the San Diego Volleyball Club Boys 17's and Girls 15's and 16's teams.

Luyties began his college-coaching career as an assistant at the University of Colorado. He coached there for three seasons and reached the NCAA Tournament twice. He spent six seasons coaching at Southern Mississippi with an overall record of 85 wins and 96 losses. His last season at Southern Mississippi was his most successful with an overall record of 27–5, obtaining the Golden Eagles first league title. Due to his coaching performance, Luyties earned Conference USA Coach of the Year honors.

Luyties took over the head coach position at UC San Diego in 2010.

== Personal life ==
Luyties graduated from UCLA in 1985 with a bachelor's degree in economics.

He met his wife, Lorie, at a beach volleyball tournament. They currently live in San Diego, California with their two daughters, Chloe and Lia.
