= Anne Marie Anderson =

American sportscaster

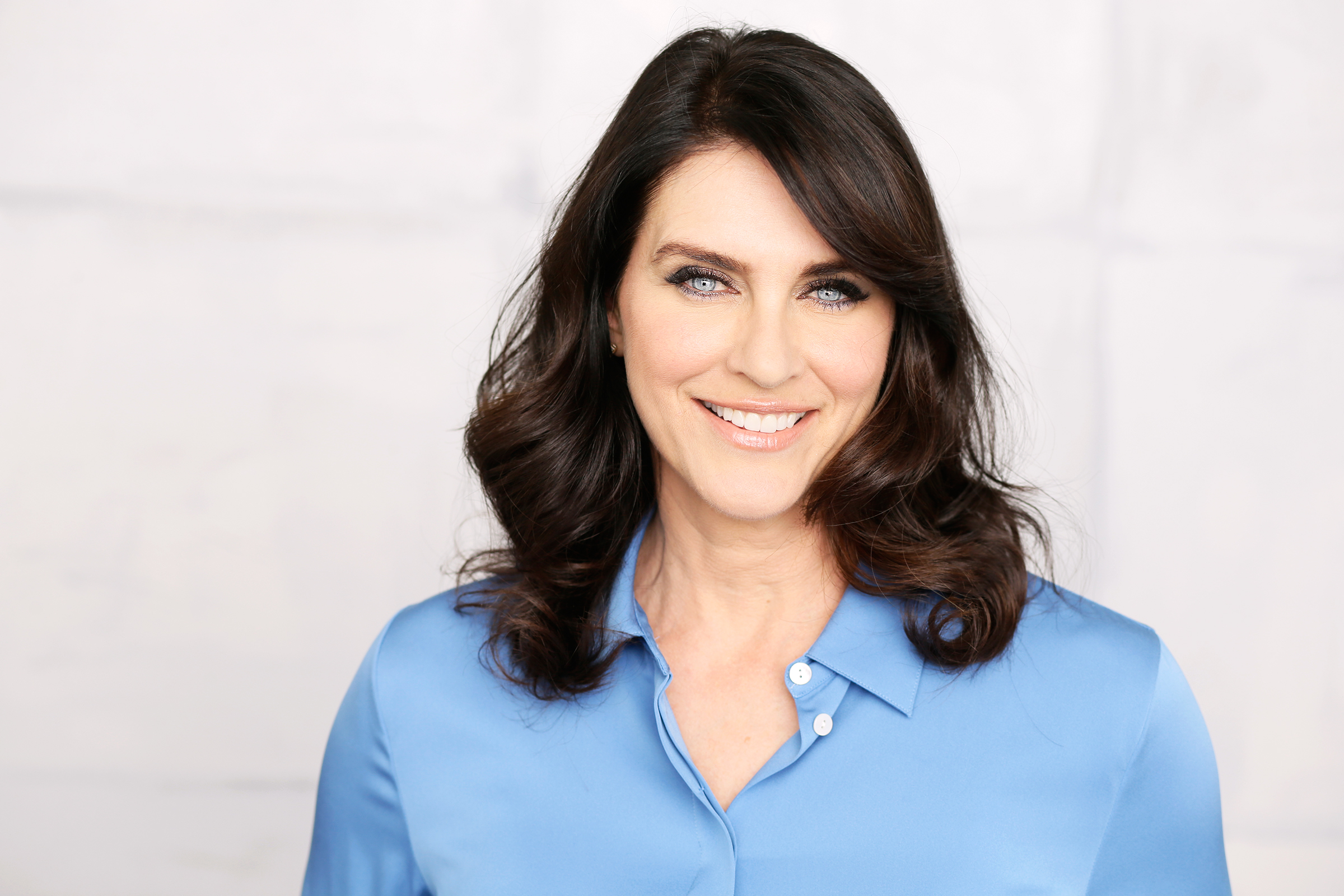
- Born: Anne Marie Jeffords; November 25
- Other name: Anne Marie Anderson
- Occupations: keynote speaker and three time Emmy award winning sports broadcaster
- Years active: 1988–present
- Sports commentary career
- Team: Las Vegas Aces
- Website: www.annemarieanderson.com

Anne Marie Anderson (born November 25) is a three-time Emmy Award winning broadcaster, keynote speaker and emcee. Having spent more than three decades in sports television, she has covered six Olympic games, heavyweight title fights, golf's majors, NBA/MLB playoffs and the Super Bowl among countless other marquee events. Anderson has served as a play-by-play announcer on several major networks including ESPN, ABC, NBC, FOX and TBS.

== Early life and career ==
Anderson played volleyball for Hofstra's Pride from 1985 to 1988 (as Anne Marie Jeffords). In 1988, the team was East Coast Conference Champion and Anderson was selected as co-MVP with Kris Keigan-Pfanstiel. As of 2012, Anderson held the following career records for Hofstra Volleyball:

Anderson began her television career while in college at SportsChannel New York. She worked as a camera operator, stage manager and video screener.

== ESPN ==
In 2000, Anderson began to transition from behind the scenes to in front of the camera. She did features for NBA Today, SportsCenter and ESPN2. In 2003, she became a sideline reporter on college football, track and field and bowling while still maintaining her producing duties and writing Olympic features for ESPN The Magazine. Two years later she moved to the game table on live event coverage. Although she started as an analyst for volleyball, Anderson quickly transitioned to play by play on more than ten sports. She continues to work for ESPN on a per assignment basis as well as on a variety of other networks.

== CBS College TV (CSTV) ==
In 2005, Anderson left producing and focused solely on her career in front of the camera. She was a volleyball and basketball analyst for CSTV as well as play by play for track and field

== Fox Sports Net ==
In 2010, Anderson hosted the PAC-10 Women's Basketball tournament on Fox Sports Net alongside Lisa Leslie, as well as served as a sideline reporter on regular season games. In 2011, Anderson filled in on FSN's The Final Score.

== Pac-12 Network ==
In 2012, the Pac-12 Network was launched and hired Anderson in the play by play role for their men's and women's college sports. She can currently be seen on beach and indoor volleyball, soccer, basketball waterpolo and softball broadcasts on the Network.

== Las Vegas Aces ==
From 2018 to 2021 Anderson served as the play-by-play announcer for the Las Vegas Aces of the Women's National Basketball Association.
