= 2022 NCAA men's volleyball tournament =

Men's college volleyball tournament

Tournament details
- Dates: May 1–7
- Teams: 7

Final positions
- Champions: Hawai'i (2nd title)
- Runners-up: Long Beach State

Tournament statistics
- Matches played: 6
- Attendance: 12,566 (2,094 per match)

Awards
- Most Outstanding Player: Spyros Chakas ^{(Hawai'i)}

The 2022 NCAA men's volleyball tournament was the 51st edition of the NCAA men's volleyball tournament, an annual tournament to determine the national champion of NCAA Division I and Division II men's collegiate indoor volleyball. The single-elimination tournament began with play-in matches. The entire tournament was hosted by the University of California Los Angeles from May 1 to 7, 2022 at Pauley Pavilion in Los Angeles, California. Hawai'i defeated Long Beach State for their second consecutive national championship 3–0 (the school's 2002 title was vacated due to NCAA violations).

All opening round matches were streamed on PAC-12.com. The semifinals were on live on NCAA.com. ESPN2 broadcast the National Championship on May 7.

== Bids ==
The tournament field was announced on NCAA.com Sunday, April 24, 2022 at 1 p.m. EDT.

School	Conference	Record	Berth	Source
Hawai'i	Big West	24–5	Tournament champion	
North Greenville	Conference Carolinas	20–5	Tournament champion	
Princeton	EIVA	16–12	Tournament champion	
Ball State	MIVA	23–3	Tournament champion	
Pepperdine	MPSF	19–9	Tournament champion	
Long Beach State	Big West	20–5	At-large	
UCLA	MPSF	21–4	At-large	

== Bracket ==
Opening Round; Sunday, May 1 P12+
6	Princeton	0
7	North Greenville	3

Quarterfinals; Tuesday, May 3 P12+
4	UCLA	3
5	Pepperdine	1
3	Hawai'i	3
7	North Greenville	0

Semifinals; Thursday, May 5 NCAA.com
1	Long Beach State	3
4	UCLA	2
2	Ball State	2
3	Hawai'i	3

National Championship; Saturday, May 7 ESPN2
1	Long Beach State	0
3	Hawai'i	3

== Schedule and results ==
All times Pacific.

Match	Time	Matchup	Score	Attendance	Broadcasters	Referees
Opening Round – Sunday, May 1
1	5:00 p.m.	Princeton vs. North Greenville	0–3 (21–25, 18–25, 38–40)	538	Darren Preston	Keith Murlless, Dean Hoskin, Jim Findura, Phil Coughlin
Quarterfinals – Tuesday, May 3
2	5:00 p.m.	UCLA vs. Pepperdine	3–1 (25–23, 22–25, 26–24, 25–19)	1,814	Darren Preston	Ray Mink, Keith Murlless, Jim Findura, Phil Coughlin
3	7:30 p.m.	Hawai'i vs. North Greenville	3–0 (25–15, 25–17, 25–16)	1,814	Darren Preston	Dean Hoskin, Ray Mink, Jim Findura, Phil Coughlin
Semifinals – Thursday, May 5
4	5:00 p.m.	Long Beach State vs. UCLA	3–2 (18–25, 18–25, 25–15, 25–10, 16–14)	4,430	Brendan Gulick	Ray Mink, Dean Hoskin, Jim Findura, Phil Coughlin
5	7:30 p.m.	Ball State vs. Hawai'i	2–3 (26–28, 25–19, 25–20, 20–25, 11–15)	4,430	Brendan Gulick	Keith Murlless, Ray Mink, Jim Findura, Phil Coughlin
National Championship – Saturday, May 7
6	5:00 p.m.	Long Beach State vs. Hawai'i	0–3 (22–25, 21–25, 20–25)	5,784	Paul Sunderland & Kevin Barnett	Dean Hoskin, Keith Murlless, Jim Findura, Phil Coughlin

== All Tournament Team ==
- Spyros Chakas, Hawai'i (Most Outstanding Player)
- Dimitrius Mouchlias, Hawai'i
- Aleksandar Nikolov, Long Beach State
- Spencer Olivier, Long Beach State
- Jakob Thelle, Hawai'i
- Quinn Isaacson, Ball State
- Ethan Champlin, UCLA
