= 2026 Pepperdine Waves men's volleyball team =

American college volleyball season

2026 Pepperdine Waves men's volleyball
- Conference: Mountain Pacific Sports Federation

Ranking
- Coaches: No. 6
- Record: 23-5 (13 -1 MPSF)
- Head coach: Jonathan Winder (4th season)
- Associate head coach: Matthew Pollock (2nd season)
- Assistant coach: Will Craft (4th season)
- Home arena: Firestone Fieldhouse

The 2026 Pepperdine Waves men's volleyball team is the varsity intercollegiate volleyball program of Pepperdine University. The Waves, led by head coach Jonathan Winder, play their home games in Firestone Fieldhouse. Pepperdine has been a member of the Mountain Pacific Sports Federation (MPSF) since the conference's inception for the 1993 season. Pepperdine began the season ranked fourth in the nation. The 2026 season marks the first year in which the NCAA men's volleyball tournament will feature twelve teams, expand to reflect the sport's continued growth.

2026 Mountain Pacific Sports Federation men's volleyball standings
	Conf.				Overall
Team	W		L	PCT	W		L	PCT
No. 1 UCLA ‍‍‍	11	–	1	.917	24	–	1	.960
No. 4 Pepperdine ‍‍‍	11	–	1	.917	20	–	5	.800
No. 6 USC ‍‍‍	9	–	3	.750	17	–	4	.810
No. 8 BYU ‍‍‍	7	–	5	.583	20	–	9	.690
Vanguard ‍‍‍	6	–	6	.500	10	–	13	.435
No. 14 Stanford ‍‍‍	6	–	6	.500	9	–	14	.391
Concordia Irvine ‍‍‍	4	–	8	.333	7	–	16	.304
Jessup ‍‍‍	3	–	9	.250	9	–	15	.375
Menlo ‍‍‍	2	–	10	.167	3	–	18	.143
UC Merced ‍‍‍	1	–	11	.083	4	–	16	.200
† – Conference champion ‡ – MPSF tournament champion y – Invited to the NCAA tournament As of April 13, 2026; Rankings from AVCA

== Previous season ==
In 2025, the Waves finished the season with a 21-10 overall record and a 14–4 record in the MPSF conference, and finished third in the conference standings . The Waves also won the 2025 MPSF tournament against USC in four sets. In the 2025 NCAA Championship semifinals, the Waves ended the season with a four set loss to the Long Beach State Beach.

== Preseason ==
The preseason MPSF Coaches' Poll was released on December 11, 2025 with the Waves picked to finish tied for second with the USC Trojans.

=== MPSF Coaches' Poll ===
Coaches' Poll
Pos.	Team	Points
1	UCLA	75 (4)
T-2	Pepperdine	74 (4)
T-2	USC	74 (2)
4	Stanford	54
5	BYU	52
6	Concordia	37
7	Menlo	31
8	Vanguard	26
9	Jessup	18
10	UC Merced	13

== Roster ==
2026 Pepperdine Waves Roster
No.	Name	Position	Height	Year	Hometown
1	Jayden Bargiel	MB	6'10"	R-Fr.	O'Fallon, Ill.
2	Zach Chapin	L	6'1"	R-Fr.	Manhattan Beach, Calif.
3	Ephraim Abhulime	MB	6'7"	So.	Providence, R.I.
4	Noe Matthey	MB	6'7"	Fr.	Weinfelden, Switzerland
5	Andrej Polomac	S	6'6"	Jr.	Gornji Milanovac, Serbia
6	Jacob Reilly	L	6'0"	Sr.	Cypress, Texas
7	Daniel DeVine	OPP	6'5"	Fr.	Los Altos, Calif.
8	Jensen Pascua	S	6'3"	R-Fr.	Castle Rock, Colo.
9	Grant Lamoureux	OH	6'10"	R-Fr.	Clemmons, N.C.
10	Cole Hartke	OH/OPP	6'11"	So.	Barrington, Ill.
11	Ryan Graves	S	6'4"	Jr.	Irvine, Calif.
12	Ethan Watson	MB	6'8"	R-Jr.	Sunnyvale, Calif.
13	Dylan Gallagher	MB	6'7"	Fr.	Newport Beach, Calif.
14	Ryan Barnett	OH	6'5"	R-Sr.	Westhampton Beach, N.Y.
17	Aidan Tune	OH	6'1"	R-Jr.	Honolulu, Hawaii
18	Vincent Coello	OH/OPP	6'7"	R-Fr.	New Berlin, Wis.
22	Jose Gomez	OH	6'4"	So.	Trinidad, Cuba
23	William Whiddent	MB	6'7"	So.	Sal Clemente, Calif.
24	Matt Mazur	OPP	6'9"	R-So.	Lancaster, N.Y.
25	Tyler Alden	OH	6'4"	R-Fr.	Santa Cruz, Calif.
26	James Eadie	MB	6'7"	R-Jr.	Newport Beach, Calif.
40	Ford Harman	OH/L	6'0"	R-Fr.	Santa Barbara, Calif.

=== Coaches ===
2026 Pepperdine Waves Coaching Staff
Position	Name	Season
Head Coach	Jonathan Winder	4th
Associate Head Coach 1	Matthew Pollock	2nd
Associate Head Coach 2	Luke Reynolds	3rd
Assistant Coach 1	Will Craft	4th
Head Coach Emeritius	Marv Dunphy	9th

== Schedule ==
2026 Pepperdine Waves Schedule 23-5 (13-1 MPSF)
Date Time	TV Radio	Opponents(Conf. Rank)	Rank(Conf. Rank)	Stadiums	Scores	Sets	Attendance	Overall	MPSF
Jan. 9 6:00 pm	B1G+	St. Thomas Aquinas	No. 4	Firestone Fieldhouse Malibu, CA	W, 3-0	25-18 25–17 25–12	336	1-0	—
Jan. 11 3:00 pm	B1G+	Daemen University	No. 4	Firestone Fieldhouse Malibu, CA	W, 3-0	25-17 25–17 25–16	334	2-0	—
Jan. 16 6:00 pm	B1G+	No. 7 UC Irvine	T-3	Firestone Fieldhouse Malibu, CA	L, 1-3	23-25 24–26 25–22 20–25	906	2-1	—
Jan. 23 4:00 pm	Marquee Sports Network	@ No. 6 Loyola Chicago	No. 6	Gentile Arena Chicago, IL	W, 3-0	25-15 25–20 30–28	1181	3-1	—
Jan 24 3:00 pm	Not Televised	@ No. 9 Lewis	No. 6	Neil Carey Arena Romeoville, IL	W, 3–2	23-25 23–25 25–23 25–17 15–11	903	4-1	—
Jan. 30 6:00 pm	B1G+	@ No. 2 Long Beach State	No. 6	Firestone Fieldhouse Malibu, CA	L, 1–3	20-25 25–20 28–30 25–27	937	4-2	—
Feb. 6 6:00 pm	ESPN+	@ No. 16 CSUN	No. 6	The Matadome Northridge, CA	W, 3-0	25-22 25–18 25–10	480	5-2	—
Feb. 10 6:00 pm	B1G+	Vanguard MPSF	No. 6	Firestone Fieldhouse Malibu, CA	W, 3-0	25-12 25–14 25–21	367	6-2	1-0
Feb. 14 7:00 pm	B1G+	No. 15 UC Santa Barbara	No. 6	Firestone Fieldhouse Malibu, CA	W, 3-2	23-25 27–25 25–11 21–25 15–5	630	7-2	1-0
Feb. 18 7:00 pm	ESPN+	@ No. 14 UC Santa Barbara	No. 6	The Thunderdome Santa Barbara, CA	L, 0–3	23-25 21–25 24–26	304	7-3	1-0
Feb. 21 7:00 pm	B1G+	No. 19 Lincoln Memorial	No. 6	Firestone Fieldhouse Malibu, CA	W, 3-0	25-16 25–16 25–18	531	8-3	1-0
Feb. 27 7:00 pm	PacWest Network	Jessup MPSF	No. 7	Warrior Arena Rocklin, CA	W, 3-1	25-21 25–27 25–17 25–9	300	9-3	2-0
Feb. 28 7:00 pm	PacWest Network	Jessup MPSF	No. 7	Warrior Arena Rocklin, CA	W, 3-0	25-18 25–21 25–20	325	10-3	3-0
Mar. 4 9:00 pm	SPEC	@ No. 3 Hawaii	No. 7	Stan Sheriff Center Honolulu, Hawaii	W, 3-1	28-26 25–22 15–25 30–28	6790	11-3	3-0
Mar. 6 9:00 pm	SPEC	@ No. 3 Hawaii	No. 7	Stan Sheriff Center Honolulu, Hawaii	L, 1–3	22-25 25–21 15–25 34–36	8440	11-4	3-0
Mar. 11 6:00 pm	B1G+	No. 15 Penn State	No. 6	Firestone Fieldhouse Malibu, CA	W, 3-1	25-16 25–15 22–25 25–16	561	12-4	3-0
MPSF Conference Matches
Mar. 15 3:00 pm	Not Televised	Menlo	No. 6	Haynes-Prim Pavilion Atherton, CA	W, 3-0	25-16 25–15 25–12	65	13-4	4-0
Mar. 20 6:00 pm	B1G+	UC Merced	No. 6	Firestone Fieldhouse Malibu, CA	W, 3-0	25-15 25–12 25–12	519	14-4	5-0
Mar. 21 4:00 pm	B1G+	UC Merced	No. 6	Firestone Fieldhouse Malibu, CA	W, 3-0	25-15 25–10 25–17	416	15-4	6-0
Mar. 27 6:00	B1G+/BYUtv	@ No. 9 BYU	No. 6	Smith Fieldhouse Provo, UT	W, 3-1	25-21 19–25 25–23 25–15	3456	16-4	7-0
Mar. 28 6:00 pm	B1G+/BYUtv	@ No. 9 BYU	No. 6	Smith Fieldhouse Provo, UT	W, 3-1	20-25 25–23 25–19 25–22	3907	17–4	8-0
Apr. 2 6:00 pm	B1G+	No. 1 UCLA	No. 6	Firestone Fieldhouse Malibu, CA	W, 3-2	23-25 31–29 25–22 25–18 15–13	1278	18–4	9–0
Apr. 4 5:00 pm	B1G+	@ No. 1 UCLA	No. 6	Pauley Pavilion Los Angeles, CA	L, 1-3	29-27 16–25 17–25 22–25	2150	18–5	9–1
Apr. 10 6:00 pm	B1G+	No. 14 Stanford	No. 5	Firestone Fieldhouse Malibu, CA	W, 3-0	25-20 25-19 25-17	913	19-5	10-1
Apr. 11 6:00 pm	B1G+	No. 14 Stanford	No. 5	Firestone Fieldhouse Malibu, CA	W, 3-1	25-17 23-25 25-19 25-21	723	20-5	11-1
Apr. 16 7:00 pm	B1G+	@ No. 6 USC	No. 4	Galen Center Los Angeles, CA	W, 3-0	25-21 25-23 29-27	1053	21-5	12-1
Apr. 18 6:00 pm	B1G+	No. 6 USC	No. 4	Firestone Fieldhouse Malibu, CA	W, 3-0	25-20 25-22 25-18	2780	22-5	13-1
MPSF Tournament
Apr. 22 10:00 am	B1G+	(7) Jessup (Quarterfinals)	No. 4 (2)	Smith Fieldhouse Provo, UT	W, 3-0	25-19 25-21 25-22	213	23-5	—
Apr. 23 4:00 pm	B1G+	(3) No. 5 USC (Semifinals)	No. 4 (2)	Smith Fieldhouse Provo, UT					—

Time: Pacific Standard Time

== Rankings ==
	Weeks																	
Poll	Pre	1	2	3	4	5	6	7	8	9	10	11	12	13	14	15	16	Final
AVCA	4	T-3	6	6	6	6	6	7	7	6	6	6	6	5	4	4		
