= 2027 UC Irvine Anteaters men's volleyball team =

American college men's volleyball season

2027 UC Irvine Anteaters men's volleyball
- Conference: Big West Conference
- Record: 0–0 (0–0 Big West)
- Head coach: David Kniffin (15th season)
- Assistant coach: Michael Brinkley (4th season)
- Home stadium: Bren Events Center; Crawford Hall

The 2027 UC Irvine Anteaters men's volleyball team are the varsity intercollegiate volleyball program of the University of California, Irvine. The Anteaters, led by head coach David Kniffin, play their home games in the Bren Events Center located on campus in Irvine, California. UC Irvine has been a member of the Big West Conference since the 2017–18 season, when the league began sponsoring the sport. This year is also the second year that twelve teams had a chance to play in the NCAA men's volleyball tournament, as the NCAA expanded the tournament to accommodate the sport's growth.

2027 Big West Conference men's volleyball standings
	Conf.				Overall
Team	W		L	PCT	W		L	PCT
Cal State Northridge ‍‍‍	0	–	0	–	0	–	0	–
Hawaii ‍‍‍	0	–	0	–	0	–	0	–
Long Beach State ‍‍‍	0	–	0	–	0	–	0	–
UC Irvine ‍‍‍	0	–	0	–	0	–	0	–
UC San Diego ‍‍‍	0	–	0	–	0	–	0	–
UC Santa Barbara ‍‍‍	0	–	0	–	0	–	0	–
† – Conference champion ‡ – Big West tournament champion y – Invited to the NCAA tournament As of November 19, 2026; Rankings from AVCA

== Previous season ==
Last season, UC Irvine finished with a 21–9 record, going 5–5 in the Big West, and finished third in the conference. In the conference tournament, they beat CSUN 3–1 in the quarterfinals. Then, UC Irvine lost to eventual tournament champion Long Beach State in three straight sets. Due to the expansion of the tournament, UC Irvine was granted an at-large bid to the UCLA regional, and played Penn State in the regional round, where they won 3–2. Thus, UC Irvine went on to play UCLA in the regional finals, where they upset the No. 1 seed 3–2. This marked their first win against UCLA since 2017. UC Irvine played Ball State in the semifinals for a chance to play for their fifth national championship, winning 3–1. The Anteaters took on Hawai'i in the NCAA finals, a team the squad has not beaten since 2024. They also lost this match, falling 1–3. This was the first time in program history the Anteaters have lost in a national championship game.

== Preseason ==
Both the preseason All-Big West team and the Big West Coaches' Poll have not been released yet.

== Roster ==
2027 UC Irvine Anteaters Roster
No.	Name	Position	Height	Year	Hometown
1	Shane Aitken	L	6'0"	4th	San Clemente, Calif.
2	Micah Tumas	S/OPP	6'7"	2nd	West Palm Beach, FL
3	Kobe Brown	MB	6'10"	4th	Petaluma, Calif.
4	Andon Kiriakou	OPP	6'2"	4th	Toronto, Canada
5	Conrad Spidsø	OPP	6'7"	2nd	Oslo, Norway
6	Tim Ennis	OH	6'4"	3rd	Scotch Plains, NJ
7	Micah Goss	MB	6'6"	3rd	Santa Barbara, Calif.
8	Lukas Winn	MB	6'6"	3rd	Castro, Valley, Calif.
9	Dylan Taylor	S/OPP	6'5"	1st	Redding, Calif.
10	Nicolas Restrepo	MB	6'9"	4th	Camarillo, Calif.
11	Aidan Rigg	S/OPP	6'6"	4th	Honolulu, Hawaii.
12	Trevor Clark	MB	6'10"	4th	Lake Elsinore, Calif.
13	Georgi Binev	OH	6'3"	5th	Varna, Bulgaria
15	Cameron Kosty	S/OPP	6'6"	3rd	Hayward, Calif.
16	Aidan Cuppett	OH	6'4"	3rd	Los Altos, Calif.
17	Filippos Chrysostomou	OH	6'7"	2nd	Larnaca, Cyprus
18	Collin Applegate	OPP	6'9"	3rd	Murrieta, Calif.
22	Jackson Kern	L	6'1"	1st	Libertyville, Illinois
23	Andreas Brinck	OH	6'10"	Fr.	Vaerloesse, Denmark

=== Coaches ===
2026 UC Irvine Anteaters Coaching Staff
Position	Name	Season
Head Coach	David Kniffin	15th
Assistant Coach	Michael Brinkley	4th

== Schedule ==
Legend
	Anteaters win
	Anteaters loss
	Postponement
*	Non-Conference Game

2027 UC Irvine Anteaters Men's Volleyball Game Log (0–0)
Regular season (0–0)

January (0–0)
Date	TV	Opponent	Rank	Stadium	Score	Sets	Attendance	Overall	BWC
UC Santa Barbara Invitational
January 7	ESPN+	vs. NJIT*		The Thunderdome; Santa Barbara, California					—
January 8	ESPN+	vs. Pacific*		The Thunderdome					—
January 9	ESPN+	vs. Concordia Irvine*		The Thunderdome					—
January 13	ESPN+	Harvard*		Bren Events Center; Irvine, California					—
January 15	B1G+	at Pepperdine*		Firestone Fieldhouse; Malibu, California					—
January 22	B1G+	at Vanguard*		Freed Center; Costa Mesa, CA					—
January 29	ESPN+	BYU*		Bren Events Center					—
January 30	ESPN+	BYU*		Bren Events Center					—

February (0–0)
Date	TV	Opponent	Rank	Stadium	Score	Sets	Attendance	Overall	BWC
February 3	ESPN+	USC*		Bren Events Center; Irvine, California					—
February 5	B1G+	at USC*		Galen Center; Los Angeles, CA					—
February 12	B1G+	at Pacific*		Alex G. Spanos Center; Stockton, CA					—
February 13	B1G+	at Stanford*		Maples Pavilion; Stanford, CA					—
February 19	ESPN+	at Concordia Irvine*		CU Arena; Irvine, California					—
February 24	ESPN+	UCLA*		Bren Events Center					—
February 26	B1G+	at UCLA*		Pauley Pavilion; Los Angeles, CA					—

March (0–0)
Date	TV	Opponent	Rank	Stadium	Score	Sets	Attendance	Overall	BWC
March 5	ESPN+	Stanford*		Bren Events Center; Irvine, CA					—
March 12	ESPN+	Princeton*		Bren Events Center					—
March 26	ESPN+	at Hawaii		Stan Sheriff Center; Honolulu, HI					
March 27	ESPN+	at Hawaii		Stan Sheriff Center					

April (0–0)
Date	TV	Opponent	Rank	Stadium	Score	Sets	Attendance	Overall	BWC
April 2	ESPN+	UC San Diego		LionTree Arena; La Jolla, CA					
April 3	ESPN+	UC San Diego		Bren Events Center; Irvine, CA					
April 9	ESPN+	CSUN		Bren Events Center					
April 10	ESPN+	at CSUN		The Matadome; Northridge, CA					
April 16	ESPN+	Long Beach State		Bren Events Center					
April 17	ESPN+	at Long Beach State		Walter Pyramid; Long Beach, CA					
April 23	ESPN+	at UC Santa Barbara		The Thunderdome; Santa Barbara, CA					
April 24	ESPN+	UC Santa Barbara		Bren Events Center					

Postseason (0–0)

Big West Tournament (0–0)
Date	TV	Opponent	Rank	Stadium	Score	Sets	Attendance	Record	Postseason Record
April 29	SSN/ESPN+			Walter Pyramid; Long Beach, CA					
*Non-conference game. ^{#}Rankings from AVCA Poll. (#) Tournament seedings in parentheses. All times are in Pacific.

== Rankings ==
Ranking movements
	Week																	
Poll	Pre	1	2	3	4	5	6	7	8	9	10	11	12	13	14	15	16	Final
AVCA																		
