= 2026 UCLA Bruins men's volleyball team =

American college volleyball season

2026 UCLA Bruins men's volleyball
- Conference: Mountain Pacific Sports Federation

Ranking
- Coaches: No. 1
- Record: 29–2 (13–1 MPSF)
- Head coach: John Hawks (2nd season)
- Associate head coach: Milan Zarkovic (1st season)
- Assistant coaches: Lindsey Brown; Alex Knight
- Home arena: Pauley Pavilion

The 2026 UCLA Bruins men's volleyball team is the varsity intercollegiate volleyball program of the University of California, Los Angeles (UCLA). The Bruins, led by head coach John Hawks, play their home matches in Pauley Pavilion located on campus in Los Angeles, California. UCLA has been a member of the Mountain Pacific Sports Federation (MPSF) since the conference's inception for the 1993 season. UCLA began the season ranked No. 1 in the AVCA preseason coaches poll. The 2026 season marks the first year in which the NCAA men's volleyball tournament will feature twelve teams, expanded to reflect the sport's continued growth.

2026 Mountain Pacific Sports Federation men's volleyball standings
	Conf.				Overall
Team	W		L	PCT	W		L	PCT
No. 1 UCLA †‡y ‍‍‍	13	–	1	.929	29	–	1	.967
No. 4 Pepperdine †y ‍‍‍	13	–	1	.929	23	–	6	.793
No. 5 USC y ‍‍‍	9	–	5	.643	19	–	7	.731
Vanguard ‍‍‍	8	–	6	.571	12	–	14	.462
No. 16 Stanford ‍‍‍	8	–	6	.571	11	–	15	.423
No. 8 BYU ‍‍‍	7	–	7	.500	21	–	12	.636
Jessup ‍‍‍	5	–	9	.357	11	–	16	.407
Concordia Irvine ‍‍‍	4	–	10	.286	7	–	19	.269
Menlo ‍‍‍	2	–	12	.143	3	–	20	.130
UC Merced ‍‍‍	1	–	13	.071	4	–	18	.182
† – Conference champion ‡ – MPSF tournament champion y – Invited to the NCAA tournament As of April 27, 2026; Rankings from AVCA

== Previous season ==
In 2025, the Bruins finished the season with a 22-7 overall record and a 10-2 record in the MPSF conference, and finished first in the conference standings. The Bruins lost to the Pepperdine Waves in the 2025 MPSF tournament semifinals in five sets. The team still received an at-large bid to the NCAA tournament, looking to a third national championship. The Bruins ended the season with a three straight set loss to the Long Beach State Beach in the national championship match.

== Preseason ==
The preseason MPSF Coaches' Poll was released on December 11, 2025 with the Bruins picked to finish first in the conference.

=== MPSF Coaches' Poll ===
Coaches' Poll
Pos.	Team	Points
1	UCLA	75 (4)
T-2	Pepperdine	74 (4)
T-2	USC	74 (2)
4	Stanford	54
5	BYU	52
6	Concordia	37
7	Menlo	31
8	Vanguard	26
9	Jessup	18
10	UC Merced	13

== Roster ==
2026 UCLA Bruins Roster
No.	Name	Position	Height	Year	Hometown
1	Cameron Thorne	MB	6'4"	Sr.	Hollywood, Fla.
2	Jaidin Russell	OPP	6'5"	Jr.	Newton, Mass.
3	Luca Curci	OH	6'3"	Jr.	Newport Beach, Calif.
4	Brogan Glenn	L	6'0"	Fr.	Newport Beach, Calif.
5	Caleb Sapp	OPP	6'8"	So.	Upland, Calif.
6	Spencer Graves	MB	6'5"	So.	Pacific Palisades, Calif.
7	Andrew Rowan	S	6'6"	Sr.	Trabuco Canyon, Calif.
8	Micah Wong Diallo	MB	6'9"	Jr.	Los Angeles, Calif.
9	Trent Taliaferro	S	6'5"	So.	Redondo Beach, Calif.
10	Filippos Chrysotomou	OH	6'6"	Fr.	Larnaca, Cyprus
12	Sean Kelly	OH	6'7"	So.	Manhattan Beach, Calif.
13	Matthew Thornton	L	6'1"	Jr.	Dana Point, Calif
15	Christopher Hersh	MB	6'9"	R-Jr.	Cupertino, Calif.
19	David Decker	OPP	6'9"	R-Jr.	Winston-Salem, N.C.
20	Grayson Bradford	OPP/OH	6'10"	Fr.	Manhattan Beach, Calif.
21	Zach Rama	OH	6'8"	So.	Phoenix, Ariz.
23	Rafael Urbina	S	6'3"	Fr.	Broomfield, Colo.
24	Marek Turner	OH	6'3"	Fr.	Long Beach, Calif.
28	Christopher Connelly	L	5'9"	R-Jr.	Naples, Fla.

=== Coaches ===
2026 UCLA Bruins Coaching Staff
Position	Name	Season
Head Coach	John Hawks	2nd
Associate Head Coach	Milan Zarkovic	1st
Assistant coach 1	Lindsey Brown	2nd
Assistant coach 2	Alex Knight	1st

== Schedule ==
2026 UCLA Bruins Schedule 27-1 (13-1 MPSF)
Date Time	TV Radio	Opponents (Conf. Rank)	Rank (Conf. Rank)	Stadiums	Scores	Sets	Attendance	Overall	MPSF
Jan. 9 7:00 pm	B1G+	No. 15 McKendree	No. 1	Pauley Pavilion Los Angeles, CA	W, 3-0	25-16 25-18 25-22	800	1-0	0-0
Jan. 11 5:00 pm	B1G+	Concordia MPSF	No. 1	Pauley Pavilion Los Angeles, CA	W, 3-0	25-13 25-20 25-17	681	2-0	1-0
First Point Collegiate Challenge
Jan. 17 6:00 pm	ESPN+	No. 16 Ball State	No. 1	Phoenix Convention Center Phoenix, AZ	W, 3-1	22-25 26-24 26-24 25-20	2200	3-0	2-0
Jan. 18 6:00 pm	ESPNU	No. 6 Loyola Chicago	No. 1	Phoenix Convention Center Phoenix, AZ	W, 3-0	25-23 25-19 26-24	2200	4-0	2-0
Jan 22 7:00 pm	B1G+	Fort Valley State	No. 1	Pauley Pavilion Los Angeles, CA	W, 3-0	25-21 25-17 25-15	515	5-0	2-0
Jan. 23 7:00 pm	ESPN+	@ No. 11 UC San Diego	No. 1	LionTree Arena La Jolla, CA	W, 3-0	25-21 25-21 28-26	2540	6-0	2-0
Jan. 27 7:00 pm	B1G+	Vanguard MPSF	No.1	Pauley Pavilion Los Angeles, CA	W, 3-0	25-17 25-21 25-20	434	7-0	2-0
Jan. 29 7:00 pm	BTN	Ohio State	No. 1	Pauley Pavilion Los Angeles, CA	W, 3-0	25-21 48-46 25-20	1056	8-0	3-0
Feb. 6 7:00 pm	ESPN+	@ No.2 Long Beach State	No. 1	Walter Pyramid Long Beach, CA	W, 3-2	16-25 22-25 25-22 25-19 15-10	4252	9-0	3-0
Feb. 7 7:00 pm	B1G+	@ Vanguard MPSF	No. 1	Freed Center Cost Mesa, CA	W, 3-0	25-18 25-20 25-17	307	10-0	3-0
Feb. 13 7:00 pm	B1G+	No. 17 CSUN	No. 1	Pauley Pavilion Los Angeles, CA	W, 3-0	25-18 25-20 25-22	1057	11-0	4-0
Feb. 20 7:00 pm	B1G+	No. 2 Long Beach State	No. 1	Pauley Pavilion Los Angeles, CA	W, 3-1	25-15 23-25 27-25 26-24	4842	12-0	4-0
Feb. 25 7:00 pm	ESPN+	@ No. 12 UC Santa Barbara	No. 1	Thunderdome Santa Barbara, CA	W, 3-0	25-23 28-26 32-30	1595	13-0	4-0
Feb. 27 7:00 pm	Not Televised	@ No. 4 UC Irvine	No. 1	Bren Events Center Irvine, CA	W, 3-2	25-22 20-25 28-30 25-22 15-11	4133	14-0	4-0
Mar. 3 7:00 pm	BTN	@ No. 5 USC MPSF	No. 1	Galen Center Los Angeles, CA	W, 3-2	21-25 25-23 22-25 30-28 15-9	2733	15-0	4-0
Mar. 6 7:00 pm	B1G+	No. 5 USC MPSF	No. 1	Pauley Pavilion Los Angeles, CA	W, 3-1	25-22 23-25 25-15 25-19	5373	16-0	5-0
OUTRIGGER Invitational
Mar. 12 7:00 pm	SPEC	No. 14 Lewis	No. 1	Stan Sheriff Center Honolulu, HI	W, 3-0	25-22 25–23 25-19	—	17-0	5-0
Mar. 13 7:00 pm	SPEC	Mount Olive	No. 1	Stan Sheriff Center Honolulu, HI	Cancelled			17-0	5-0
Mar. 14 7:00	SPEC	@ No. 3 Hawaii	No. 1	Stan Sheriff Center Honolulu, HI	W, 3-0	25-18 25-20 30-28	10300	18-0	5-0
MPSF Conference Matches
Mar. 27 6:00 pm		@ No. 14 Stanford	No. 1	Maples Pavilion Stanford, CA	W, 3-0	25-17 25-23 25-20	1347	19-0	6-0
Mar. 28 6:00 pm		@ No. 14 Stanford	No. 1	Maples Pavilion Stanford, CA	W, 3-0	25-21 25-22 25-21	1612	20-0	7-0
Apr. 2 6:00 pm	B1G+	@ No. 6 Pepperdine	No. 1	Firestone Fieldhouse Malibu, CA	L, 2-3	25-23 29-31 22-25 25-18 13-15	1278	20-1	7-1
Apr. 4 5:00 pm	B1G+	No. 6 Pepperdine	No. 1	Pauley Pavilion Los Angeles, CA	W, 3-1	27-29 25-16 25-17 25-22	2150	21-1	8-1
Apr. 9 6:00 pm	B1G+	@ UC Merced	No. 1	Greg and Cathie Hostetler Court Merced, CA	W, 3-0	25-15 25-21 25-17	270	22-1	9-1
Apr. 10 6:00 pm	B1G+	@ UC Merced	No. 1	Greg and Cathie Hostetler Court Merced, CA	W, 3-1	23-25 25-19 25-21 25-19	—	23-1	10-1
Apr. 12 2:00 pm	B1G+	@ Menlo	No. 1	Haynes-Prim Pavilion Atherton, CA	W, 3-0	25-23 25-16 25-16	230	24-1	11-1
Apr. 16 7:00 pm	B1G+	No. 8 BYU	No. 1	Pauley Pavilion Los Angeles, CA	W, 3-1	25-14 17-25 25-17 25-18	1426	25-1	12-1
Apr. 18 5:00 pm	B1G+	No. 8 BYU	No. 1	Pauley Pavilion Los Angeles, CA	W, 3-1	21-25 25-17 25-23 27-25	1541	26-1	13-1
MPSF Tournament
Apr 22 4:00 pm	B1G+	(8) Concordia (Quarterfinals)	No. 1 (1)	Smith Fieldhouse Provo, UT	W, 3-0	25-23 25-15 25-19	472	27-1	—
Apr 23 6:30 pm	B1G+	(4) No. 8 BYU (Semifinals)	No. 1 (1)	Smith Fieldhouse Provo, UT	W, 3-1	20-25 25-19 25-17 25-18	2204	28-1	—
Apr. 5 6:00 pm	BTN	(3) No. 6 USC (Finals)	No. 1 (1)	Smith Fieldhouse Provo, UT	W, 3-1	25-23 22-25 28-26 26-24	1402	29-1	—
NCAA Championship
May 2 5:00 pm	ESPN+	No. 6 UC Irvine (8)	No. 1	Pauley Pavilion Los Angeles, CA	L, 2–3	(23–25, 25–19, 23–25, 25–19, 14–16)	1673	29–2	—

Time: Pacific Standard Time

== Rankings ==
	Weeks																	
Poll	Pre	1	2	3	4	5	6	7	8	9	10	11	12	13	14	15	16	Final
AVCA	1	1	1	1	1	1	1	1	1	1	1	1	1	1	1	1		
