= 2026 BYU Cougars men's volleyball team =

American college volleyball season

2026 BYU Cougars men's volleyball
- Conference: Mountain Pacific Sports Federation
- Record: 21–12 (9–7 MPSF)
- Head coach: Shawn Olmstead (12th season)
- Assistant coaches: Devin Young (8th season); Otavio Souza (4th season)
- Home arena: Smith Fieldhouse

The 2026 BYU Cougars men's volleyball team represented Brigham Young University as the men's intercollegiate volleyball program during the 2026 NCAA Division I & II men's volleyball season. The Cougars, led by head coach Shawn Olmstead, played their home games in the Smith Fieldhouse located on campus in Provo, Utah. BYU has been a member of the Mountain Pacific Sports Federation (MPSF) since the conference's inception for the 1993 season. BYU began the season ranked eighth in the nation. The 2026 season marked the first year in which the NCAA men's volleyball tournament will feature twelve teams, expanded to reflect the sport's continued growth.

2026 Mountain Pacific Sports Federation men's volleyball standings
	Conf.				Overall
Team	W		L	PCT	W		L	PCT
No. 1 UCLA †‡y ‍‍‍	13	–	1	.929	29	–	1	.967
No. 4 Pepperdine †y ‍‍‍	13	–	1	.929	23	–	6	.793
No. 5 USC y ‍‍‍	9	–	5	.643	19	–	7	.731
Vanguard ‍‍‍	8	–	6	.571	12	–	14	.462
No. 16 Stanford ‍‍‍	8	–	6	.571	11	–	15	.423
No. 8 BYU ‍‍‍	7	–	7	.500	21	–	12	.636
Jessup ‍‍‍	5	–	9	.357	11	–	16	.407
Concordia Irvine ‍‍‍	4	–	10	.286	7	–	19	.269
Menlo ‍‍‍	2	–	12	.143	3	–	20	.130
UC Merced ‍‍‍	1	–	13	.071	4	–	18	.182
† – Conference champion ‡ – MPSF tournament champion y – Invited to the NCAA tournament As of April 27, 2026; Rankings from AVCA

It was a season of new beginnings for BYU men's volleyball as one conference foe folded, Grand Canyon, but two new teams joined the MPSF: UC Merced and Jessup. Grand Canyon's discontinuation of men's volleyball also led 3 Grand Canyon players to transfer to BYU including one returnee: Trent Moser.

== Previous season ==
In 2025, the Cougars finished the season with a 19–10 overall record and a 7–5 record in the MPSF, finishing fourth overall in the conference standings. In the 2025 MPSF tournament quarterfinals, the Cougars ended the season with a five set loss to the Stanford Cardinal.

== Preseason ==
The preseason MPSF Coaches' Poll was released on December 11, 2025, with the Cougars picked to finish fifth in the conference.

=== MPSF Coaches Poll ===
Coaches' Poll
Pos.	Team	Points
1	UCLA	75 (4)
T-2	Pepperdine	74 (4)
T-2	USC	74 (2)
4	Stanford	54
5	BYU	52
6	Concordia	37
7	Menlo	31
8	Vanguard	26
9	Jessup	18
10	UC Merced	13

== Roster ==
2026 BYU Cougars Roster
No.	Name	Position	Height	Year	Hometown
1	Kyle Zediker	S	6'5"	So.	Naperville, IL
3	Tyler Herget	S	6'2"	Sr.	Darlen, Conn.
4	Trevor Herget	OH	6'3"	Fr.	Darlen, Conn.
5	Corbin Batista	OH/OPP	6'7"	Fr.	St. George, UT
6	Jackson Fife	L	6'0"	So.	Upland, Calif.
7	AJ Cottle	MB	6'9"	Fr.	Provo, UT
8	Trey Thorton	OH/OPP	6'6"	Fr.	Spanish Fork, UT
9	Tellon-Jonathan Tufuga	OH/OPP	6'5"	Jr.	Long Beach, Calif.
10	Tennison Lighthall	OH/OPP	6'6"	Fr.	Pleasant View, UT
13	Trent Moser	OH	6'8"	Sr.	Gilbert, Ariz.
14	Ian Little	OPP	6'5"	Jr.	Temecula, Calif.
15	Bernardo Adam	L/OH	6'3"	Jr.	Itajaí, Santa Catarina, Brazil
16	Connor Oldani	OH	6'5"	So.	Phoeniz. Ariz.
17	Gavin Chambers	MB	6'9"	So.	Corona, Calif.
20	Evan Olmstead	L	6'0"	Fr.	Highland, UT
21	Tyler James Johnson	S	6'3"	Fr.	Weston, Fla.
22	Max Philippe	MB	6'6"	Fr.	Houston, Tex.
24	Cole Hauser	OH/L	6'3"	Sr.	San Diego, Calif.

=== Coaches ===
2026 BYU Cougars Coaching Staff
Position	Name	Season
Head Coach	Shawn Olmstead	12th
Assistant coach 1	Devin Young	8th, but only for the first 11 games. Afterwards he was hired as Pacific's new head coach
Assistant coach 2	Otavio Souza	4th

== Schedule ==
1 home game was televised on BTN and simulcast on byutv.org. The other 15 home matches were live on B1G+ with 8 matches being streamed tape delayed on byutv.org while the other 7 were live on both platforms. All road games and the neutral site match at Harvard were streamed by the opposing schools streaming service. The conference tournament was streamed by B1G+ with the championship being televised live on BTN.

2026 BYU Cougars Schedule 21-11 (9-7 MPSF)
Date Time	TV Radio	Opponents	Rank	Stadiums	Scores	Sets	Attendance	Overall	MPSF
Jan. 9 7:00 pm	byutv.org Live; B1G+	St. Francis	No. 8	Smith Fieldhouse Provo, UT	W, 3-0	25–22, 25–20, 25–18	3343	1–0	
Jan. 10 7:00 pm	B1G+ byutv.org (TD @ 10 PM)	St. Francis	No. 8	Smith Fieldhouse Provo, UT	W, 3-0	25–18, 25–19, 25–19	3313	2–0	
Jan. 16; 7:00 pm	B1G+ byutv.org (TD @ 10 PM)	No. 10 UC San Diego	No. 8	Smith Fieldhouse Provo, UT	W, 3-0	25–21, 25–19, 25–19	4230	3–0	
Jan. 17 7:00 pm	byutv.org Live; B1G+	No. 10 UC San Diego	No. 8	Smith Fieldhouse Provo, UT	W, 3-1	25–13, 16–25, 25–21, 35–33	4356	4–0	
Jan. 23 7:00 pm	byutv.org Live; B1G+	No. 5 UC Irvine	No. 8	Smith Fieldhouse Provo, UT	L, 2-3	25–16, 25–21, 24–26, 23–25, 13–15	4255	4–1	
Jan. 24 7:00 pm	byutv.org Live; B1G+	No. 5 UC Irvine	No. 8	Smith Fieldhouse Provo, UT	L, 2-3	17–25, 24–26, 25–23, 25–23, 10–15	4301	4–2	
Jan. 29; 8:00 pm	ESPN+	@ No. 15 UC Santa Barbara	No. 8	The Thunderdome; Santa Barbara, CA	W, 3-0	25–22, 25–18, 26–24	397	5–2	
Jan. 30; 8:00 pm	ESPN+	@ No. 15 UC Santa Barbara	No. 8	The Thunderdome Santa Barbara, CA	W, 3-0	29–27, 25–20, 25–20	652	6–2	
Harvard Invitational
Feb. 6; 2:00 pm	ESPN+	No. 20 Lincoln Memorial	No. 8	Malkin Athletic Center Cambridge, MA	W, 3-0	25–21, 25–19, 25–19	67	7–2	
Feb. 7; 5:00 pm	ESPN+	@ Harvard	No. 8	Malkin Athletic Center Cambridge, MA	W, 3-0	25–22, 29–27, 25–19	350	8–2	
Feb. 9; 4:00 pm	ESPN+	@ Merrimack	No. 7	Sakowich Center North Andover, MA	W, 3-0	25–11, 25–17, 25–17	185	9–2	
Feb. 13; 7:00 pm	B1G+ byutv.org (TD @ 10 PM)	Menlo MPSF	No. 7	Smith Fieldhouse Provo, UT	W, 3-0	25–21, 25–18, 25–21	3760	10–2	1-0
Feb. 14; 7:00 pm	B1G+ byutv.org (TD @ 10 PM)	Menlo MPSF	No. 7	Smith Fieldhouse Provo, UT	W, 3-0	25–23, 25–18, 25–15	3343	11–2	2-0
Feb. 20; 7:00 pm	B1G+ byutv.org (TD @ 10 PM)	Fort Valley State	No. 7	Smith Fieldhouse Provo, UT	W, 3-0	25–18, 25–16, 25–14	3703	12–2	2-0
Feb. 21; 7:00 pm	B1G+ byutv.org (TD @ 10 PM)	Fort Valley State	No. 7	Smith Fieldhouse Provo, UT	W, 3-0	25-14, 25-18, 25-21	3331	13-2	2-0
UH BYU Rivalry presented by OUTRIGGER
Feb. 25; 10:00 pm	SPEC ESPN+	@ No. 3 Hawai'i	No. 7	Stan Sheriff Center Honolulu, HI	L, 1-3	25-27, 25-23, 17-25, 25-18	5568	13-3	2-0
Feb. 27; 10:00 pm	SPEC ESPN+	@ No. 3 Hawai'i	No. 7	Stan Sheriff Center Honolulu, HI	L, 0-3	18-25, 21-25, 16-25	6989	13-4	2-0
MPSF Conference Matches
Mar. 6 7:00 pm	B1G+	@ UC Merced	No. 6	Greg and Cathie Hostetler Court Merced, CA	W, 3-0	25-19, 25-12, 25-13	736	14-4	3-0
Mar. 7 8 pm	B1G+	@ Jessup	No. 6	Murchison Gym Rocklin, CA	W, 3-1	23-25, 25-16, 25-20, 25-16	1575	15-4	4-0
Mar. 13 7:00 pm	B1G+	@ No. 18 Stanford	No. 7	Maples Pavilion Stanford, CA	L, 1-3	21-25, 22-25, 25-23, 28-30	582	15-5	4-1
Mar. 14 6:00 pm	B1G+	@ No. 18 Stanford	No. 7	Maples Pavilion Stanford, CA	L, 2-3	25-23, 21-25, 23-25, 25-22, 10-15	1474	15-6	4-2
Mar. 20 7:00 pm	B1G+ byutv.org (TD @ 10 PM)	Concordia Irvine	No. 10	Smith Fieldhouse Provo, UT	W, 3-0	25-17, 25-14, 25-21	3730	16-6	5-2
Mar. 21 7 pm	B1G+ byutv.org (TD @ 10 PM)	Concordia Irvine	No. 10	Smith Fieldhouse Provo, UT	W, 3-0	25-15, 25-23, 25-17	3133	17-6	6-2
Mar. 27 7 pm	byutv.org Live B1G+	No. 6 Pepperdine	No. 9	Smith Fieldhouse Provo, UT	L, 1-3	21-25, 25-19, 23-25, 15-25	3456	17-7	6-3
Mar. 28 7 pm	byutv.org Live B1G+	No. 6 Pepperdine	No. 9	Smith Fieldhouse Provo, UT	L, 1-3	25-20, 23-25, 19-25, 22-25	3907	17-8	6-4
Apr. 2 8 pm	B1G+	@ Vanguard	No. 10	Don Nasser Family Plaza Costa Mesa, CA	W, 3-0	25-17, 25-15, 25-20	250	18-8	7-4
Apr. 3 8 pm	B1G+	@ Vanguard	No. 10	Don Nasser Family Plaza Costa Mesa, CA	W, 3-0	25-22, 25-18, 25-20	217	19-8	8-4
Apr. 10 7 pm	byutv.org Live B1G+	No. 4 USC	No.10	Smith Fieldhouse Provo, UT	W, 3-1	25-23, 20-25, 30-28, 25-18	3429	20-8	9-4
Apr. 11 7 pm	byutv.org Live BTN	No. 4 USC	No. 10	Smith Fieldhouse Provo, UT	L, 2-3	25-19, 27-29, 25-18, 21-25, 12-15	4259	20-9	9-5
Apr. 16 8 pm	B1G+	@ No. 1 UCLA	No. 8	Pauley Pavilion Los Angeles, CA	L, 1-3	14-25, 25-17, 17-25, 18-25	1426	20-10	9-6
Apr. 18 8 pm	B1G+	@ No. 1 UCLA	No. 8	Pauley Pavilion Los Angeles, CA	L, 1-3	25-21, 17-25, 23-25, 25-27	1541	20-11	9-7
MPSF Tournament
Date Time	TV Radio	Opponents (Conf. Rank)	Rank (Conf. Rank)	Stadiums	Scores	Sets	Attendance	Overall	MPSF
Apr. 22 7:30 pm	B1G+	(4) No. 14 Stanford (Quarterfinals)	No. 8 (5)	Smith Fieldhouse Provo, UT	W, 3-1	25-18, 25-14, 23-25, 25-21	1831	21-11	—
Apr. 23 7:30 pm	B1G+	(1) No. 1 UCLA (semifinals)	No. 8 (5)	Smith Fieldhouse Provo, UT	L 1–3	25–20, 19–25, 17–25, 18–25	2204	21–12	—

Times: Mountain Time Zone

== Rankings ==
	Weeks																	
Poll	Pre	1	2	3	4	5	6	7	8	9	10	11	12	13	14	15	16	Final
AVCA	8	8	8	8	7	7	7	7	6	7	10	9	10	10	8	8		
