= 2026 USC Trojans men's volleyball team =

American college volleyball season

2026 USC Trojans men's volleyball
- Conference: Mountain Pacific Sports Federation

Ranking
- Coaches: No. 4
- Record: 18-6 (9-5 MPSF)
- Head coach: Jeff Nygaard (11th season)
- Associate head coach: Rory Prager (4th season)
- Assistant coaches: Gary Sato (11th season); Paul Martinez (3rd season)
- Home arena: Galen Center

The 2026 USC Trojans men's volleyball team is the varsity intercollegiate volleyball program of the University of Southern California (USC). The Trojans, led by head coach Jeff Nygaard, play their home matches in the Galen Center located on campus in Los Angeles, California. The University of Southern California has been a member of the Mountain Pacific Sports Federation (MPSF) since the conference's inception for the 1993 season. USC began the season ranked No. 5 in the AVCA preseason coaches poll. The 2026 season marks the first year in which the NCAA men's volleyball tournament will feature twelve teams, expanded to reflect the sport's continued growth.

2026 Mountain Pacific Sports Federation men's volleyball standings
	Conf.				Overall
Team	W		L	PCT	W		L	PCT
No. 1 UCLA †‡y ‍‍‍	13	–	1	.929	29	–	1	.967
No. 4 Pepperdine †y ‍‍‍	13	–	1	.929	23	–	6	.793
No. 5 USC y ‍‍‍	9	–	5	.643	19	–	7	.731
Vanguard ‍‍‍	8	–	6	.571	12	–	14	.462
No. 16 Stanford ‍‍‍	8	–	6	.571	11	–	15	.423
No. 8 BYU ‍‍‍	7	–	7	.500	21	–	12	.636
Jessup ‍‍‍	5	–	9	.357	11	–	16	.407
Concordia Irvine ‍‍‍	4	–	10	.286	7	–	19	.269
Menlo ‍‍‍	2	–	12	.143	3	–	20	.130
UC Merced ‍‍‍	1	–	13	.071	4	–	18	.182
† – Conference champion ‡ – MPSF tournament champion y – Invited to the NCAA tournament As of April 27, 2026; Rankings from AVCA

== Previous season ==
In 2025, the Trojans finished the season with a 21-7 overall record and a 8-4 record in the MPSF conference, and finished second in the conference standings. In the 2025 MPSF tournament, the Trojans beat the No. 13 Stanford Cardinals in the semifinals in four sets. The Trojans ended the season with a four set loss to the Pepperdine Waves in the championship match.

== Preseason ==
The preseason MPSF Coaches' Poll was released on December 11, 2025 with the Trojans picked to finish tied for second with the Pepperdine Waves.

=== MPSF Coaches' Poll ===
Coaches' Poll
Pos.	Team	Points
1	UCLA	75 (4)
T-2	Pepperdine	74 (4)
T-2	USC	74 (2)
4	Stanford	54
5	BYU	52
6	Concordia	37
7	Menlo	31
8	Vanguard	26
9	Jessup	18
10	UC Merced	13

== Roster ==
2026 USC Trojans Roster
No.	Name	Position	Height	Year	Hometown
1	Dilon Klein	OH	6'6"	Sr.	Pacific Palisades, Calif.
2	Noah Roberts	OH	6'8"	R-Jr.	Seal Beach, Calif.
4	Brad Pan	L	5'10"	Jr.	Cupertino, Calif.
7	Ryan Sprague	S	6'4"	Sr.	Manhattan Beach, Calif.
8	Parker Tomkinson	MB	7'0"	So,	Carlsbad, Calif.
9	Caleb Blanchette	S	6'5"	Jr.	Brentwood, Tenn.
10	Johnny Dykstra	L	6'2"	So.	Manhattan Beach, Calif.
11	Riley Haine	OH	6'6"	R-Jr.	Hawai'i Kai, Hawai'i
12	Sterling Foley	OH	6'6"	So.	Newport Beach, Calif.
13	Christian Connell	OH	6'5"	So.	San Diego, Calif.
15	Andrew Chapin	S	6'4"	Fr.	Manhattan Beach, Calif.
16	Wesley Smith	MB	6'11"	Jr.	Encinitas, Calif.
17	Tyler Robinson	MB	6'8"	So.	Manhattan Beach, Calif.
18	Kale Cochran	OH	6'7"	Fr.	Roseville, Calif.
20	Kahale Clini	OH	6'3"	Jr.	Honolulu, Hawaii
21	Jakobi Lange	OH	6'4"	R-So.	Hinsdale, Ill.
22	Eamon Rigdon	OPP	6'6"	So.	Costa Mesa, Calif.
23	Cooper Keane	OH	6'7"	Fr.	Manhattan Beach, Calif.
24	Jack Ebertin	OH	6'6"	Jr.	Mountain View, Calif.
26	Nick Waldron	MB	6'8"	Fr.	Santa Clarita, Calif.
29	Thiago Zamprogno	MB	6'7"	Jr.	Vitória, Brazil

=== Coaches ===
2026 USC Trojans Coaching Staff
Position	Name	Season
Head Coach	Jeff Nygaard	11th
Associate Head Coach 1	Rory Prager	4th
Assistant Coach 1	Gary Sato	11th
Assistant Coach 2	Paul Martinez	3rd

== Schedule ==
2026 USC Trojans Schedule 18-6 (9-5 MPSF)
Date Time	TV Radio	Opponents (Conf. Rank)	Rank (Conf. Rank)	Stadiums	Scores	Sets	Attendance	Overall	MPSF
Jan. 10 5:00 pm	B1G+	St. Thomas Aquinas	No. 5	Galen Center Los Angeles, CA	W, 3-0	25-16 25-15 25-15	200	1-0	—
Jan. 15 7:00 pm	B1G+	@ Vanguard MPSF	No. 5	Freed Center Costa Mesa, CA	W, 3-0	25-22 25-17 25-14	200	2-0	1-0
Jan. 16 7:00 pm	B1G+	No. 18 Princeton	No. 5	Galen Center Los Angeles, CA	W, 3-1	25-17 20-25 26-24 25-18	1109	3-0	1-0
Jan. 24 5:00 pm	B1G+	Fort Valley State	No. 4	Galen Center Los Angeles, CA	W, 3-0	25-14 25-22 25-22	310	4-0	1-0
Jan 30 7:00 pm	B1G+	No. 13 Ohio State	No. 4	Galen Center Los Angeles, CA	W, 3-2	25-19 21-25 25-27 27-25 15-11	1378	5-0	1-0
Feb. 4 7:00 pm	B1G+	No. 16 CSUN	No. 4	Galen Center Los Angeles, CA	W, 3-2	25-19 25-20 19-25 17-25 15-13	649	6-0	1-0
Feb. 7 5:00 pm	ESPN+	No. 15 UC Santa Barbara	No. 4	Galen Center Los Angeles, CA	W, 3-0	25-21 25-23 25-16	1125	7-0	1-0
Feb. 11 6:00 pm	B1G+	@ No. 5 UC Irvine	No. 4	Bren Events Center Irvine, CA	W, 3-2	24-26 22-25 25-16 25-19 18-16	2120	8-0	1-0
Feb. 13 7:00 pm	B1G+	No. 5 UC Irvine	No. 4	Galen Center Los Angeles, CA	L, 1-3	20-25 23-25 25-23 23-25	1063	8-1	1-0
Mar. 3 7:00 pm	B1G+	No. 1 UCLA MPSF	No. 5	Galen Center Los Angeles, CA	L, 2-3	25-21 23-25 25-22 28-30 9-15	2733	8-2	1-1
Mar. 6 7:00 pm	B1G+	@ No. 1 UCLA MPSF	No. 5	Pauley Pavilion Los Angeles, CA	L, 1-3	22-25 25-23 15-25 19-25	5373	8-3	1-2
Mar. 12 6:00 pm	B1G+	@ Concordia MPSF	No. 5	CU Arena Irvine, CA	W, 3-0	25-17 25-12 25-18	280	9-3	2-2
Mar. 14 5:00 pm	B1G+	No. 15 Penn State	No. 5	Galen Center Los Angeles, CA	W, 3-0	25-13 25-14 25-17	1567	10-3	2-2
MPSF Conference Matches
Mar. 20 7:00 pm	B1G+	Jessup	No. 4	Galen Center Los Angeles, CA	W, 3-0	25-13 25-20 25-16	167	11-3	3-2
Mar. 21 5:00 pm	B1G+	Jessup	No. 4	Galen Center Los Angeles, CA	W, 3-0	27-25 25-16 25-16	173	12-3	4-2
Mar. 27 7:00 pm	B1G+	Menlo	No. 4	Galen Center Los Angeles, CA	W, 3-0	25-14 25-11 25-20	688	13-3	5-2
Mar. 28 5:00 pm	B1G+	Menlo	No. 4	Galen Center Los Angeles, CA	W, 3-0	25-21 25-16 25-11	814	14-3	6-2
Apr. 3 7:00 pm	B1G+	No. 14 Stanford	No. 4	Galen Center Los Angeles, CA	W, 3-0	25-14 25-21 25-22	990	15-3	7-2
Apr. 4 5:00 pm	B1G+	No. 14 Stanford	No. 4	Galen Center Los Angeles, CA	W, 3-1	25-21 23-25 25-16 25-17	1004	16-3	8-2
Apr. 10 6:00 pm	B1G+	@ No. 10 BYU	No. 4	Smith Fieldhouse Provo, UT	L, 1-3	23-25 25-20 28-30 18-25	3429	16-4	9-3
Apr. 11 7:00 pm	B1G Network	@ No. 10 BYU	No. 4	Smith Fieldhouse Provo, UT	W, 3-2	19-25 29-27 18-25 25-21 25-12	4259	17-4	9-3
Apr. 16 7:00 pm	B1G+	No. 4 Pepperdine	No. 6	Galen Center Los Angeles, CA	L, 0-3	21-25 23-25 27-29	1053	17-5	9-4
Apr. 18 6:00 pm	B1G+	@ No. 4 Pepperdine	No. 6	Firestone Fieldhouse Malibu, CA	L, 0-3	20-25 22-25 18-25	2780	17-6	9-5
MPSF Tournament
Apr. 22 12:30 pm	B1G+	(6) Vanguard	(3) No. 6	Smith Fieldhouse Provo, UT	W, 3-0	25-19 25-13 25-21	227	18-6	—
Apr. 23 4:00 pm	B1G+	(2) No. 4 Pepperdine	(3) No. 6	Smith Fieldhouse Provo, UT				—	

Time: Pacific Standard Time

== Rankings ==
	Weeks																	
Poll	Pre	1	2	3	4	5	6	7	8	9	10	11	12	13	14	15	16	Final
AVCA	5	5	4	4	4	4	5	5	5	5	4	4	4	4	6	6		
