= 2026 UC San Diego Tritons men's volleyball team =

2026 UC San Diego Tritons men's volleyball
- Conference: Big West Conference

Ranking
- Coaches: No. 13
- Record: 13–13 (3–7 Big West)
- Head coach: Brad Rostratter (4th season)
- Assistant coaches: Jorge Collazo (4th season); Noah Cotterman (1st season)
- Home stadium: LionTree Arena

The 2026 UC San Diego Triton's men's volleyball team is the varsity intercollegiate volleyball program of the University of California, San Diego (UCSD). The Tritons, led by head coach Brad Rostratter, home game in the LionTree Arena located on the campus in La Jolla, California. UC San Diego has been a member of the Big West Conference since its transition to NCAA Division I athletics after accepting an invitation in 2017, with the men's volleyball team beginning conference play in 2018. UC San Diego began the season ranked No. 14 in the AVCA preseason coaches poll. The 2026 season marks the first year in which the NCAA men's volleyball tournament will feature twelve teams, expanded to reflect the sport's continued growth.

2026 Big West Conference men's volleyball standings
	Conf.				Overall
Team	W		L	PCT	W		L	PCT
No. 2 Hawaii ‍‍‍	9	–	1	.900	26	–	4	.867
No. 3 Long Beach State ‍‍‍	8	–	2	.800	22	–	4	.846
No. 5 UC Irvine ‍‍‍	5	–	5	.500	18	–	7	.720
No. 9 UC Santa Barbara ‍‍‍	5	–	5	.500	14	–	12	.538
No. 11 UC San Diego ‍‍‍	3	–	7	.300	13	–	13	.500
No. 18 Cal State Northridge ‍‍‍	0	–	10	.000	12	–	15	.444
† – Conference champion ‡ – Big West tournament champion y – Invited to the NCAA tournament As of April 23, 2026; Rankings from AVCA

== Previous season ==
The Tritons finished the 2025 season 18-12, going 3–7 in Big West play and finished fourth in the conference. In the 2025 Big West Tournament, the Tritons ended their season with a three straight set loss to the Long Beach State Beach.

== Preseason ==
Both the preseason All-Big West team, and the Big West Coaches' Poll were released on December 29, 2025. UC San Diego was picked to finish tied for 4 along with Cal State Northridge and UC Santa Barbara. UC San Diego did not have any players make the preseason team.

=== Big West Coaches' Poll ===
Coaches' Poll
Pos.	Team	Points
1	Long Beach State	24 (4)
2	Hawai'i	22 (2)
3	UC Irvine	17
T-4	CSUN	9
T-4	UC San Diego	9
T-4	UC Santa Barbara	9

== Roster ==
2026 UC San Diego Tritons Roster
No.	Name	Position	Height	Year	Hometown
1	Luke Chandler	R-Sr.	6'6"	R-Sr.	Newport Beach, Calif.
2	Cameron Wurl	S	6'7"	R-Jr.	San Diego, Calif.
4	Tyler Stewart	S	6'4"	So.	Broomfield, Colo.
5	Evan Boyle	L	6'0"	R-Jr.	La Crescenta, Calif.
6	Leo Pravednikov	OH	6'5"	R-Jr.	Long Beach, Calif.
7	Ethan Hornyak	MB	6'5"	Jr.	San Diego, Calif.
8	Aiden Powell	OH	6'2"	R-So.	Laguna Hills, Calif.
9	Leo Wiemelt	MB	6'8"	Jr.	La Grange, Ill.
11	John Luers	S	6'2"	R-Sr.	Lebanon, Ohio
12	Josh Ewert	OH	6'4"	R-Jr.	Moraga, Calif.
13	Kieran Dumain	OH	6'4"	F	Aliso Viejo, Calif.
14	Jim Garrison	MB	6'9"	R-Sr.	Austin, Texas
15	Will Bartelt	OH	6'5"	Fr.	San Diego, Calif.
16	Michael Robertson	OPP	6'7"	R-Jr.	Westchester, Calif.
17	Keegan Cook	L	6'0"	R-So.	Coto de Caza, Calif.
22	Sebastiano Sani	OH	6'5"	Jr.	Bethesda, Md.
23	Ben Warren	MB	6'7"	R-Fr.	Toronto, Ontario
24	Peter Selcho	MB	6'5"	R-Sr.	Fountain Valley, Calif.

=== Coaches ===
2026 UC San Diego Tritons Coaching Staff
Position	Name	Season
Head Coach	Brad Rostratter	4th
Assistant coach 1	Jorge Collazo	4th
Assistant coach 2	Noah Cotterman	1st

== Schedule ==
2026 UC San Diego Tritons Schedule 13-13 (3-7 BW)
Date Time	TV Radio	Opponents (Conf. Rank)	Rank (Conf. Rank)	Stadiums	Scores	Sets	Attendance	Overall	Big West
North American Challenge
Jan. 2 2:00 pm	Not Televised	Calgary	No. 10	Walter Pyramid Long Beach, CA	W, 3-2	25-17 24-26 16-25 25-23 15-12	114	—	—
Jan. 2 4:30 pm	Not Televised	Alberta	No. 10	Walter Pyramid Long Beach, CA	W, 3-0	25-14 25-23 25-12	118	—	—
Jan 4 12:30 pm	Not Televised	Alberta	No. 10	The Gold Mine Long Beach, CA	W, 3-0	25-16 25-21 25-15	0	—	—
Jan 4 3 pm	Not Televised	Calgary	No. 10	Walter Pyramid Long Beach, CA	W, 3-1	23-25 25-17 25-21 25-21	0	—	—
Jan. 6 7:00 pm	ESPN+	Jessup	No. 10	LionTree Arena La Jolla, CA	W, 3-1	25-20 25-22 22-25 25-20	411	1-0	—
Jan. 9 7:00 pm	ESPN+	Daemen	No. 10	LionTree Arena La Jolla, CA	W, 3-1	25-17 21-25 25-18 25-15	383	2-0	—
Jan 11 7:00 pm		Rockhurst	No. 10	LionTree Arena La Jolla, CA	W, 3-0	25-17 25-20 25-12	349	3-0	—
Jan. 16 6:00 pm	B1G+	@ No. 8 BYU	No. 10	Smith Fieldhouse Provo, UT	L, 0-3	21-25 19-25 19-25	4230	3-1	—
Jan. 17 6:00 pm	B1G+	@ No. 8 BYU	No. 10	Smith Fieldhouse Provo, UT	L, 1-3	13-25 25-16 21-25 33-35	4356	3-2	—
Jan. 23 7:00 pm	ESPN+	No. 1 UCLA	No. 11	LionTree Arena La Jolla, CA	L, 0-3	21-25 21-23 26-28	2540	3-3	—
Jan. 30 5:00 pm		@ No. 9 Lewis	T-11	Neil Carey Arena Romeoville, IL	W, 3-2	22-25 23-25 25-23 25-23 15-12	693	4-3	—
Jan. 31 5:00 pm	ESPN+	@ No. 7 Loyola Chicago	T-11	Gentile Arena Chicago, IL	L, 1-3	20-25 25-21 22-25 22-25	693	4-4	—
Feb. 11 7:00 pm	ESPN+	Concordia	No. 10	LionTree Arena La Jolla, CA	W, 3-0	25-20 25-16 25-23	463	5-4	—
Feb. 12 7:00 pm		@ Concordia	No. 10	CU Arena Irvine, CA	W, 3-0	27-25 26-24 25-23	147	6-4	—
Feb. 16 2:00 pm		UC Merced	No. 10	LionTree Arena La Jolla, CA	W, 3-0	25-15 25-21 25-15	447	7-4	—
Feb. 21 7:00 pm		@ Menlo	No. 10	Haynes-Prim Pavilion Atherton, CA	W, 3-0	25-21 25-16 25-17	125	8-4	—
Feb. 25 7:00 pm		@ Vanguard	No. 9	Freed Center Costa Mesa, CA	L, 2-3	22-25 25-21 21-25 25-23 12-15	100	8-5	—
Feb. 27 7:00 pm	ESPN+	Vanguard	No. 9	LionTree Arena La Jolla, CA	W, 3-1	28-26 25-21 24-26 25-23	418	9-5	—
Mar. 3 7:00 pm	ESPN+	No. 17 CSUN Big West	No. 11	LionTree Arena La Jolla, CA	W, 3-0	25-19 25-17 26-24	400	10-5	1-0
Mar. 6 7:00	ESPN+	@ No. 12 UC Santa Barbara Big West	No. 11	Thunderdome Santa Barbara, CA	L, 2-3	22-25 25-21 25-21 20-25 11-15	738	10-6	1-1
Mar. 9 7:00 pm	ESPN+	Princeton	No. 12	LionTree Arena La Jolla, CA	L, 2-3	19-25 24-26 25-10 25-19 10-15	551	10-7	1-1
Big West Conference Matches
Mar. 13 6:00 pm	ESPN+	@ No. 17 CSUN	No. 12	Matadome Northridge, CA	W, 3-2	18-25 25-19 25-22 21-25 15-13	203	11-7	2-1
Mar. 27 6:00 pm	ESPN+	@ No. 5 UC Irvine	No. 13	Bren Events Center Irvine, CA	L, 0-3	20-25 24-26 27-29	1016	11-8	2-2
Mar. 28 7:00 pm	ESPN+	No. 5 UC Irvine	No. 13	LionTree Arena La Jolla, CA	L, 2-3	23-25 25-19 25-23 15-25 23-15	924	11-9	2-3
Apr. 3 7:00 pm	ESPN+	No. 3 Long Beach State	No. 13	LionTree Arena La Jolla, CA	L, 1-3	25-23 27-29 21-25 20-25	958	11-10	2-4
Apr. 4 7:00 pm	ESPN+	@ No. 3 Long Beach State	No. 13	Walter Pyramid Long Beach, CA	L, 1-3	22-25 15-25 33-31 27-29	1841	11-11	2-5
Apr. 10 7:00 pm	ESPN+	No. 2 Hawaii	No. 13	LionTree Arena La Jolla, CA	L, 0-3	21-25 18-25 21-25	1172	11-12	2-6
Apr. 11 7:00 pm	ESPN+	No. 2 Hawaii	No. 13	LionTree Arena La Jolla, CA	W, 3-1	25-21 16-25 25-20 25-18	1753	12-12	3-6
Apr. 18 7:00 pm	ESPN+	No. 9 UC Santa Barbara	No. 11	LionTree Arena La Jolla, CA	L, 2-3	25-12 29-31 18-25 26-24 9-15	1024	12-13	3-7
OUTRIGGER Big West Championship presented by the Hawaiian Islands
Apr. 23 5:00 pm	ESPN+	(4) No. 9 UC Santa Barbara (Quarterfinals)	(5) No. 11	Bren Events Center Irvine, CA	W, 3-0	25-19 25-22 25-22	—	13-13	—
Apr. 24 5:00 pm	ESPN+	(1) No. 2 Hawaii (Semifinals)	(5) No. 11	Bren Events Center Irvine, CA					—

Time: Pacific Standard Time

== Rankings ==
	Weeks																	
Poll	Pre	1	2	3	4	5	6	7	8	9	10	11	12	13	14	15	16	Final
AVCA	10	10	11	T-11	10	10	10	9	11	12	13	13	13	13	11	11		
