= 2026 Hawaii Rainbow Warriors volleyball team =

American college men's volleyball season

2026 Hawaii Rainbow Warriors volleyball

Big West Regular Season Champions

NCAA Champions
- Conference: Big West Conference

Ranking
- Coaches: No. 1
- Record: 30–5 (9–1 Big West)
- Head coach: Charlie Wade (17th season)
- Associate head coach: Kupono Fey (4th season)
- Assistant coaches: Chad Giesseman (3rd season); Donan Cruz (1st season)
- Home stadium: Stan Sheriff Center

The 2026 Hawaii Rainbow Warriors men's volleyball team is the varsity intercollegiate volleyball program of the University of Hawaii at Mānoa (UH). The Rainbow Warriors, led by head coach Charile Wade, play their home games in the Stan Sheriff Center located on campus in Honolulu, Hawaii. The University of Hawaii at Mānoa has been a member of the Big West Conference since the 2017–18 season, when the league began sponsoring the sport. Hawaii began the season ranked second in the nation. This year is also the first year that twelve teams will have a chance to play in the NCAA men's volleyball tournament, as the NCAA expanded the tournament to accommodate the sport's growth.

2026 Big West Conference men's volleyball standings
	Conf.				Overall
Team	W		L	PCT	W		L	PCT
No. 1 Hawaii †y ‍‍‍	9	–	1	.900	30	–	5	.857
No. 4 Long Beach State ‡y ‍‍‍	8	–	2	.800	25	–	5	.833
No. 2 UC Irvine y ‍‍‍	5	–	5	.500	21	–	9	.700
No. 10 UC Santa Barbara ‍‍‍	5	–	5	.500	14	–	12	.538
No. 11 UC San Diego ‍‍‍	3	–	7	.300	13	–	14	.481
No. 18 Cal State Northridge ‍‍‍	0	–	10	.000	12	–	15	.444
† – Conference champion ‡ – Big West tournament champion y – Invited to the NCAA tournament As of May 12, 2026; Rankings from AVCA

== Previous season ==
Last season, the University of Hawaii finished with a 27–6 record, going 7–3 in the Big West, and finished second in the conference. They received the Big West's automatic bid to the 2025 NCAA men's volleyball tournament, beating UC Irvine and Long Beach State to win the 2025 Big West tournament. Hawaii finished the season ranked third in the nation following the NCAA tournament's conclusion, where they fell in the semifinals to UCLA.

== Preseason ==
Both the preseason All-Big West team, and the Big West Coaches' Poll were released on December 29, 2025. Hawaii was picked to finish second, and had three players make the preseason team.

=== Big West Coaches' Poll ===
Coaches' Poll
Pos.	Team	Points
1	Long Beach State	24 (4)
2	Hawai'i	22 (2)
3	UC Irvine	17
T-4	CSUN	9
T-4	UC San Diego	9
T-4	UC Santa Barbara	9

Preseason All-Big West Team
Player	No.	Position	Class
Tread Rosenthal	13	Setter	Junior
Adrien Roure	7	Opposite Hitter	Sophomore
Kristian Titriyski	10	Opposite Hitter	Junior

== Roster ==
2026 Hawaii Rainbow Warriors Roster
No.	Name	Position	Height	Year	Hometown
1	Victor Lowe	S	6'6"	So.	Santa Monica, Calif.
2	Roman Payne	MB	7'0"	Fr.	Carlsbad, Calif
3	Vladimir Kubr	S	6'3"	Sr.	Torrance, Calif.
4	Kainoa Wade	OPP	6'10"	So.	Kailua, O'ahu
6	Matthew Wheels	L/DS	5'10"	R-Fr.	Huntington Beach, Calif.
7	Adrien Roure	OH	6'5"	So.	Lyon, France
8	Magnus Hettervik	S	6'7"	Fr.	Stavanger, Norway
9	Justin Todd	OH/MB	6'8"	R-So.	Houston, Texas
10	Kristian Titriyski	OPP	6'8"	So.	Sofia, Bulgaria
11	Finn Kearney	OH/OPP	6'5"	So.	Phoenix, Ariz.
12	Mitchell Croft	OH/OPP	6'9"	So.	Melbourne, Australia
13	Tread Rosenthal	S	6'11"	Jr.	Austin, Texas
15	Kai Taylor	OH/L	6'2"	R-Jr.	Costa Mesa, Calif.
16	Ofeck Hazan	MB	6'6"	So.	Zikhron-Ya'akov, Israel
17	Thatcher Fahlbusch	OH	6'6"	Fr.	Manhattan Beach, Calif.
19	Alex Parks	MB	6'7"	R-Jr.	Honolulu, Oahu
20	Trevell Jordan	MB	6'10"	So.	Mesa, Ariz.
22	Quintin Greenidge	L	5'8"	Jr.	Cambridge, Ont. Can.
23	Louis Sakanoko	OH/OPP	6'5"	Jr.	Paris, France

=== Coaches ===
2026 Hawaii Rainbow Warrior Coaching Staff
Position	Name	Season
Head Coach	Charlie Wade	4th
Associate Head Coach	Kupono Fey	4th
Assistant coach 1	Donan Cruz	1st
Assistant coach 2	Chad Giesseman	3rd

== Schedule ==
2026 Hawaii Rainbow Warriors Schedule 28-5 (9-1 BW)
Date Time	TV Radio	Opponents	Rank	Stadiums	Scores	Sets	Attendance	Overall	Big West
Jan. 2 7:00 pm	SPEC	NJIT	No. 2	Stan Sheriff Center Honolulu, HI	W, 3-0	25-11 25–16 25–14	6721	1-0	—
Jan. 4 5:00 pm	SPEC	NJIT	No. 2	Stan Sheriff Center Honolulu, HI	W, 3-0	25-17 25–16 25–17	5952	2-0	—
Jan. 8 7:00 pm	SPEC	No. 7 Loyola Chicago	No. 2	Stan Sheriff Center Honolulu, HI	W, 3-0	25-18 25–19 25–15	5804	3-0	—
Jan. 9 7:00 pm	SPEC	No. 7 Loyola Chicago	No. 2	Stan Sheriff Center Honolulu, HI	L, 1-3	23-25 22–25 26–24 27–29	6671	3-1	—
Jan. 14 11:00 am	ESPN Honolulu	Roberts Wesleyan	No. 3	Stan Sheriff Center Honolulu, HI	W, 3-0	25-21 25–17 25–16	5523	4-1	—
Jan. 14 7:00 pm	SPEC	Rockhurst	No. 3	Stan Sheriff Center Honolulu, HI	W, 3-1	25-21 25–19 23–25 25–13	5523	5-1	—
Jan. 16 11:00 am	ESPN Honolulu	Rockhurst	No. 3	Stan Sheriff Center Honolulu, HI	W, 3-0	25-19 25–9 25–15	—	6-1	—
Jan. 16 7:00 pm	SPEC	Roberts Wesleyan	No. 3	Stan Sheriff Center Honolulu, HI	W, 3-0	25-22 25–22 25–20	6962	7-1	—
Jan. 28 2:00 pm	NEC Sports Network	@ Saint Francis (PA)	No. 3	DeGol Arena Loretto, PA	W, 3-0	25-23 25–14 25–10	528	8-1	—
Jan. 30 1:00 pm	B1G+	@ No. 14 Penn State	No. 3	Rec Hall State College, PA	W, 3-0	25-22 25–23 25–15	825	9-1	—
Jan. 31 12:00 pm	B1G+	@ No. 14 Penn State	No. 3	Rec Hall State College, PA	W, 3-1	25-27 25–10 25–15 38–36	792	10-1	—
Feb. 13 4:00 pm	B1G+	@ No. 18 Stanford	No. 3	Maples Pavilion Stanford, CA	W, 3-0	25-16 25–15 25–17	1355	11-1	—
Feb. 14 4:00 pm	B1G+	@ No. 18 Stanford	No. 3	Maples Pavilion Stanford, CA	W, 3-0	25-17 25–16 25–13	1560	12-1	—
UH BYU Rivalry presented by OUTRIGGER
Feb. 25 7:00 pm	SPEC	No. 6 BYU	No. 3	Stan Sheriff Center Honolulu, HI	W, 3-1	27-25 23–25 25–17 25–18	5568	13-1	—
Feb. 27 7:00 pm	SPEC	No. 6 BYU	No. 3	Stan Sheriff Center Honolulu, HI	W, 3-0	25-18 25–21 25–16	6989	14-1	—
Mar. 4 7:00 pm	SPEC	No. 7 Pepperdine	No. 3	Stan Sheriff Center Honolulu, HI	L, 1-3	26-28 22-25 25-15 28-30	6790	14-2	—
Mar. 6 7:00 pm	SPEC	No. 7 Pepperdine	No. 3	Stan Sheriff Center Honolulu, HI	W, 3-1	25-22 21-25 25-15 36-34	8440	15-2	—
OUTRIGGER Invitational
Mar. 12 7:00 pm	SPEC	Mount Olive	No. 3	Stan Sheriff Center Honolulu, HI	W, 3-0	25-18 25-19 25-17	5897	16-2	—
Mar. 14 7:00 pm	SPEC	No. 1 UCLA	No. 3	Stan Sheriff Center Honolulu, HI	L, 0-3	18-25 20-25 28-30	10300	16-3	—
Mar. 15 5:00 pm (Rescheduled)	SPEC	No. 14 Lewis	No. 3	Stan Sheriff Center Honolulu, HI	W, 3-1	21-25 25-22 25-20 25-21	6101	17-3	—
Big West Conference Matches
Mar. 20 4:00 pm	ESPN+	@ No. 2 Long Beach State	No. 3	Walter Pyramid Long Beach, CA	W, 3-2	26-24 23-25 25-19 20-25 15-12	3680	18-3	1-0
Mar. 21 4:00 pm	ESPN+	@ No. 2 Long Beach State	No. 3	Walter Pyramid Long Beach, CA	W, 3-0	25-18 25-22 25-20	3723	19-3	2-0
Mar. 27 7:00 pm	SPEC/ESPN+	No. 8 UC Santa Barbara	No. 2	Stan Sheriff Center Honolulu, HI	W, 3-1	25-23 25-18 19-25 25-22	8258	20-3	3-0
Mar. 28 7:00 pm	SPEC/ESPN+	No. 8 UC Santa Barbara	No. 2	Stan Sheriff Center Honolulu, HI	W, 3-0	25-16 25-22 25-13	8220	21-3	4-0
Apr. 3 3:00 pm	ESPN+	@ No. 5 UC Irvine	No. 2	Bren Events Center Irvine, CA	W, 3-2	25-22 19-25 23-25 25-23 18-16	2397	22-3	5-0
Apr. 4 3:00 pm	ESPN+	@ No. 5 UC Irvine	No. 2	Bren Events Center Irvine, CA	W, 3-0	25-22 25-22 25-22	3067	23-3	6-0
Apr. 10 4:00 pm	ESPN+	@ No. 13 UC San Diego	No. 2	LionTree Arena La Jolla, CA	W, 3-0	25-21 25-18 25-21	1172	24-3	7-0
Apr. 11 4:00 pm	ESPN+	@ No. 13 UC San Diego	No. 2	LionTree Arens La Jolla, CA	L, 1-3	21-25 25-16 20-25 18-25	1753	24-4	7-1
Apr. 17 7:00 pm	SPEC/ESPN+	No. 18 CSUN	No. 2	Stan Sheriff Center Honolulu, HI	W, 3-0	25-20 25-16 25-16	8069	25-4	8-1
Apr.18 7:00 pm	SPEC/ESPN+	No. 18 CSUN	No. 2	Stan Sheriff Center Honolulu, HI	W, 3-1	25-15 21-25 25-14 25-16	9360	26-4	9-1
OUTRIGGER Big West Championship presented by the Hawaiian Islands
Apr. 24 2:00 pm	SPEC/ESPN+	(5) No. 9 UC San Diego (Semifinals)	No. 2 (1)	Bren Events Center Irvine, CA	W, 3-1	25-19 19-25 25-20 25-13	2369	27-4	—
Apr. 25 2:00 pm	SPEC/ESPN+	(2) No. 3 Long Beach State (Finals)	No. 2 (1)	Bren Events Center Irvine, CA	L, 2-3	25-20 25-27 25-22 28-30 11-15	3501	27-5	—
NCAA Regional
May 2 4:00 pm	ESPN+	No. 5 USC (Honolulu Regional)	No. 3 (2)	Stan Sheriff Center Honolulu, HI	W, 3-1	25-22 24-26 25-23 32-30	10300	28-5	—
NCAA Championship
May 9 3:30 pm	ESPN+	(3) No. 2 Long Beach State (Semifinals)	No. 3 (2)	Pauley Pavilion Los Angeles, CA	W, 3-1	25-15 18-25 25-21 25-22	9409	29-5	—
NCAA Championship
May 11 1:00 pm	ESPN2	No. 6 UC Irvine (Championship)	No. 3 (2)	Pauley Pavilion Los Angeles, CA	W, 3-1	15-25 25-18 25-18 25-20	8414	30-5	—

== Awards ==
=== Post-Season Awards ===
The postseason All-Big West team was released on April 22, 2026, a day prior to the beginning of the Big West tournament.

All-Big West Team
Award	Player	No.	Position	Class
First Team	Quintin Greenidge	22	Libero	Junior
First Team	Tread Rosenthal	13	Setter	Junior
First Team	Adrien Roure	7	Outside Hitter	Sophomore
First Team	Louis Sakanoko	23	Outside Hitter/Opposite	Junior
First Team	Kristian Titryski	10	Opposite	Sophomore

== Rankings ==
	Weeks																	
Poll	Pre	1	2	3	4	5	6	7	8	9	10	11	12	13	14	15	16	Final
AVCA	2	T-3	3	3	3	3	3	3	3	3	3	2	2	2	2	2	3	1
