= 2026 UC Santa Barbara Gauchos men's volleyball team =

2026 UC Santa Barbara Gauchos men's volleyball
- Conference: Big West Conference

Ranking
- Coaches: No. 8
- Record: 14–12 (5–5 Big West)
- Head coach: Rick McLaughlin (18th season)
- Associate head coach: Blaine Nielsen (7th season)
- Assistant coaches: Jonah Seif (7th season); Randy DeWeese (3rd season)
- Home stadium: The Thunderdome; Rob Gym

The 2026 UC Santa Barbara Gauchos men's volleyball team is the varsity intercollegiate volleyball program of the University of California, Santa Barbara (UCSB). The Gauchos, led by head coach Rick McLaughlin, play their home games in Rob Gym and the Thunderdome located on campus in Santa Barbara, California. UC Santa Barbara has been a member of the Big West Conference since the leagues inception in 1969 when it was then known as the Pacific Coast Athletic Association (PCAA). UC Santa Barbara began the season ranked 17th in the nation. This year is also the first year that twelve teams will have a chance to play in the NCAA men's volleyball tournament, as the NCAA expanded the tournament to accommodate the sport's growth.

2026 Big West Conference men's volleyball standings
	Conf.				Overall
Team	W		L	PCT	W		L	PCT
No. 2 Hawaii ‍‍‍	9	–	1	.900	26	–	4	.867
No. 3 Long Beach State ‍‍‍	8	–	2	.800	22	–	4	.846
No. 5 UC Irvine ‍‍‍	5	–	5	.500	18	–	7	.720
No. 9 UC Santa Barbara ‍‍‍	5	–	5	.500	14	–	12	.538
No. 11 UC San Diego ‍‍‍	3	–	7	.300	13	–	13	.500
No. 18 Cal State Northridge ‍‍‍	0	–	10	.000	12	–	15	.444
† – Conference champion ‡ – Big West tournament champion y – Invited to the NCAA tournament As of April 23, 2026; Rankings from AVCA

== Previous season ==
Last season, the Gauchos finished with a 12–16 record, going 3–7 in the Big West, and finished fifth in the conference.

== Preseason ==
Both the preseason All-Big West team, and the Big West Coaches' Poll were released on December 29, 2025. UC Santa Barbara was tied for fourth among CSUN and UC San Diego, and had one player make the preseason team.

=== Big West Coaches' Poll ===
Coaches' Poll
Pos.	Team	Points
1	Long Beach State	24 (4)
2	Hawai'i	22 (2)
3	UC Irvine	17
T-4	CSUN	9
T-4	UC San Diego	9
T-4	UC Santa Barbara	9

Preseason All-Big West Team
Player	No.	Position	Class
George Bruening	5	Outside Hitter	Redshirt Sophomore

== Roster ==
2026 UC Santa Barbara Gauchos Roster
No.	Name	Position	Height	Year	Hometown
1	Riggs Guy	OH	6'3"	So.	Newport Beach, Calif.
2	Joe Wallace	L/DS	6'1"	Jr.	Los Gatos, Calif.
3	Josh Aruya	MB	6'9"	JR.	Mission Viejo, Calif.
4	Emmett Martin	OH	6'4"	R-Jr.	Mar Vista, Calif.
5	George Bruening	OH	6'10"	R-So.	Newport Beach, Calif.
6	Jason Walmer	S/L	5'9"	R-So.	Manhattan Beach, Calif.
7	William Lawler	S	6'2"	Jr.	Huntington Beach, Calif.
8	Julien Pally	OH	6'3"	Fr.	Santa Cruz, Calif.
10	Ryan Pilkvist	MB	6'7"	Fr.	El Segundo, Calif.
11	Ethan Saint	OH	6'3"	So.	Laguna Niguel, Calif.
12	Dylan Pilkvist	MB	6'7"	Fr.	El Segundo, Calif.
13	Mikey Denver	MB	6'6"	R-Fr.	Santa Barbara, Calif.
14	Marcelo Molina-Aced	OH	6'5"	Fr.	Hayward, Calif.
15	Cole Schobel	S	6'1"	Jr.	Costa Mesa, Calif.
17	William Dryden	OPP	6'7"	Fr.	Los Gatos, Calif.
18	Raglan Kear	OH	6'7"	R-Fr.	Santa Barbara, Calif.
20	Andreas Schuetz	OH/OPP	6'4"	Sr.	Santa Barbara, Calif.
21	Ashton Saint	OH/L	6'3"	R-So.	Laguna Niguel, Calif.
23	Ben Pearson	OH	6'2"	R-Jr.	Santa Cruz, Calif.
24	Owen Loncar	OH	6'3"	Sr.	Pacific Palisades, Calif.

=== Coaches ===
2026 UC Santa Barbara Gauchos Coaching Staff
Position	Name	Season
Head Coach	Rick McLaughlin	18th
Associate Head Coach	Blaine Nielsen	7th
Assistant coach 1	Jonah Seif	7th
Assistant coach 2	Randy DeWeese	3rd

== Schedule ==
2026 UC Santa Barbara Gauchos Schedule 14-12 (5-5 BW)
Date Time	TV Radio	Opponents (Conf. Rank)	Rank (Conf. Rank)	Stadiums	Scores	Sets	Attendance	Overall	Big West
ASICS Invitational
Jan. 8 2:00 pm	ESPN+	Kentucky State	No. 17	Rob Gym Santa Barbara, CA	W, 3-0	25-14 25-13 25-12	200	1-0	—
Jan. 9 4:30 pm	ESPN+	Maryville	No. 17	Rob Gym Santa Barbara, CA	W, 3-1	25-10 24-26 25-19 25-19		2-0	—
Jan. 10 7:00 pm	ESPN+	Harvard	No. 17	Rob Gym Santa Barbara, CA	W, 3-1	22-25 25-18 25-14 25-19	322	3-0	—
Jan. 16 7:00 pm	ESPN+	The Master's University (CA)	No. 17	The Thunderdome Santa Barbara, CA	W, 3-0	26-24 25-18 25-23	473	4-0	—
Jan. 22 6:00 pm	B1G+	@ No. 14 Stanford	No. 17	Maples Pavilion Stanford, CA	L, 2-3	25-22 22-25 25-18 21-25 15-17	419	4-1	—
Jan. 23 6:00 pm	B1G+	@ No. 14 Stanford	No. 17	Maples Pavilion Stanford, CA	W, 3-0	25-19 25-20 25-16	609	5-1	—
Jan. 29 7:00 pm	ESPN+	No. 8 BYU	No. 15	Rob Gym Santa Barbara, CA	L, 0-3	22-25 18-25 24-26	397	5-2	—
Jan. 30 7:00 pm	ESPN+	No. 8 BYU	No. 15	The Thunderdome Santa Barbara, CA	L, 0-3	27-29 20-25 20-25	652	5-3	—
Feb. 5 7:00 pm	Not Televised	@ Cal Lutheran	No. 15	Gilbert Arena Thousand Oaks, CA	W, 3-1	19-25 25-13 25-19 25-13	207	6-3	—
Feb. 7 5:00 pm	B1G+	@ No. 4 USC	No. 15	Galen Center Los Angeles, CA	L, 0-3	21-25 23-25 16-25	1125	6-4	—
Feb. 14 7:00 pm	B1G+	@ No. 6 Pepperdine	T-15	Firestone Fieldhouse Malibu, CA	L, 2-3	25-23 25-27 11-25 25-21 5-15	630	6-5	—
Feb. 18 7:00 pm	ESPN+	No. 6 Pepperdine	No. 14	The Thunderdome Santa Barbara, CA	W, 3-0	25-23 25-21 26-24	304	7-5	—
Feb 20 7:00 pm	ESPN+	No. 19 Lincoln Memorial	No. 14	The Thunderdome Santa Barbara, CA	W, 3-1	25-22 25-20 19-25 25-19	317	8-5	—
Feb 25 7:00 pm	ESPN+	No. 1 UCLA	No. 12	The Thunderdome Santa Barbara, CA	L, 0-3	23-25 26-28 30-32	1595	8-6	—
Mar. 6 7:00 pm	ESPN+	No. 11 UC San Diego Big West	No. 12	The Thunderdome Santa Barbara, CA	W, 3-2	25-22 21-25 21-25 25-20 15-11	738	9-6	1-0
Mar. 11 6:00 pm	ESPN+	@ No. 5 UC Irvine Big West	No. 11	Bren Event Center Irvine, CA	L, 1-3	20-25 22-25 25-21 24-26	1380	9-7	1-1
Mar 13 7:00 pm	ESPN+	No. 5 UC Irvine Big West	No.11	The Thunderdome Santa Barbara, CA	W, 3-2	16-25 25-23 18-25 25-17 17-25		10-7	2-1
Mar 24 7:00 pm	ESPN+	Cal Lutheran	No. 8	The Thunderdome Santa Barbara, CA	W, 3-1	25-23 25-16 21-25 25-18	325	11-7	
Big West Conference Matches
Mar. 27 10:00 pm	ESPN+	@ No. 2 Hawaii	No. 8	Stan Sheriff Center Honolulu, HI	L, 1-3	23-25 18-25 25-19 22-25	8258	11-8	2-2
Mar. 28 10:00 pm	ESPN+	@ No. 2 Hawaii	No. 8	Stan Sheriff Center Honolulu, HI	L, 0-3	16-25 22-25 13-25	8220	11-9	2-3
Apr. 2 7:00 pm	ESPN+	No. 18 CSUN	No. 8	The Thunderdome Santa Barbara, CA	W, 3-0	25-19 25-19 25-22	519	12-9	3-3
Apr. 4 6:00 pm	ESPN+	@ No. 18 CSUN	No. 8	Matadome Northridge, CA	W, 3-1	25-19 17-25 25-18 28-26	435	13-9	4-3
Apr. 10 7:00 pm	ESPN	@ No. 3 Long Beach State	No. 8	Walter Pyramid Long Beach, CA	L, 0-3	20-25 19-25 20-25	2131	13-10	4-4
Apr. 11 7:00 pm	ESPN+	No. 3 Long Beach State	No. 8	The Thunderdome Santa Barbara, CA	L, 0-3	13-25 20-25 21-25	1341	13-11	4-5
Apr. 18 6:00 pm	ESPN+	@ No. 11 UC San Diego	No. 9	LionTree Arena La Jolla, CA	W, 3-2	12-25 31-29 25-18 15-9	1024	14-11	5-5
OUTRIGGER Big West Championship presented by the Hawaiian Islands
Apr. 23	ESPN+	(5) No. 11 UC San Diego (Quarterfinals)	(6) No. 9	Bren Events Center Irvine, CA	L, 3-0	19-25 22-25 22-25	—	14-12	—

Time: Pacific Standard Time

== Rankings ==
	Weeks																	
Poll	Pre	1	2	3	4	5	6	7	8	9	10	11	12	13	14	15	16	Final
AVCA	17	17	17	17	15	T-15	14	12	12	11	8	8	8	8	9	9		
