= 2026 Big West Conference men's volleyball tournament =

West Conference volleyball tournament

2026 Big West Conference Men's Volleyball Tournament
- Classification: Division I/II
- Teams: 6
- Site: Bren Events Center; Irvine, California
- Champions: Long Beach State (3rd title)
- Winning coach: Nick MacRae (1st title)
- MVP: Wojcieck Gajek (Long Beach State)
- Attendance: 15,242 (3,048 per match)
- Television: ESPN+ & ESPNU
- Big West Conference Men's Volleyball Tournaments

2026 Big West Conference men's volleyball standings
	Conf.				Overall
Team	W		L	PCT	W		L	PCT
No. 3 Hawaii †y ‍‍‍	9	–	1	.900	27	–	5	.844
No. 2 Long Beach State ‡y ‍‍‍	8	–	2	.800	24	–	4	.857
No. 6 UC Irvine y ‍‍‍	5	–	5	.500	18	–	8	.692
No. 10 UC Santa Barbara ‍‍‍	5	–	5	.500	14	–	12	.538
No. 11 UC San Diego ‍‍‍	3	–	7	.300	13	–	14	.481
No. 18 Cal State Northridge ‍‍‍	0	–	10	.000	12	–	15	.444
† – Conference champion ‡ – Big West tournament champion y – Invited to the NCAA tournament As of April 30, 2026; Rankings from AVCA

The 2026 Big West Conference men's volleyball tournament is a postseason men's volleyball tournament for the Big West Conference during the 2026 NCAA Division I & II men's volleyball season. It was held April 23 through April 25, 2025 at the Bren Events Center in Irvine, California. The winner, Long Beach State, received the conference's automatic bid to the 2026 NCAA Volleyball Tournament. Runner-up Hawai'i and semifinalist UC Irvine both received at-large bids to the tournament as well.

== Seeds ==
All six teams were eligible for the postseason, with the top two seeds receiving byes to the semifinals. Teams were seeded by record within the conference, with a tiebreaker system to seed teams with identical conference records.

Seed	School	Conference	Tiebreaker
1	Hawaii	9–1	
2	Long Beach State	8–2	
3	UC Irvine	5–5	1–1 head-to-head 4–4 against common opponents 17–7 overall
4	UC Santa Barbara	5–5	1–1 head-to-head 4–4 against common opponents 14–11 overall
5	UC San Diego	3–7	
6	CSUN	0–10	

== Schedule and results ==
The entire tournament was televised on Spectrum Hawai'i and simulcast live on ESPN+.

Time Network	Matchup	Score	Attendance	Broadcasters
Quarterfinals – Thursday, April 23
5:00 pm ESPN+	No. 4 UC Santa Barbara vs. No. 5 UC San Diego	0–3 (19–25, 22–25, 22–25)	2,964	Kanoa Leahey, Chris McLachlin, Ryan Kalei Tsuji
7:30 pm ESPN+	No. 3 UC Irvine vs. No. 6 CSUN	3–1 (25–20, 20–25, 25–16, 25–23)	2,964	Kanoa Leahey, Chris McLachlin, Ryan Kalei Tsuji
Semifinals – Friday, April 24
5:00 pm ESPN+	No. 1 Hawai'i vs. No. 5 UC San Diego	3–1 (25–19, 19–25, 25–20, 25–13)	2,369	Kanoa Leahey, Chris McLachlin, Ryan Kalei Tsuji
7:30 pm ESPN+	No. 2 Long Beach State vs. No. 3 UC Irvine	3–0 (29–27, 25–16, 25–18)	3,444	Kanoa Leahey, Chris McLachlin, Ryan Kalei Tsuji
Championship – Saturday, April 25
5:00 pm ESPN+	No. 1 Hawai'i vs. No. 2 Long Beach State	2–3 (25–20, 25–27, 25–22, 28–30, 11–15)	3,501	Kanoa Leahey, Chris McLachlin, Ryan Kalei Tsuji
Game times are PST. Rankings denote tournament seeding.

== Bracket ==
Quarterfinals; Thursday, April 24
4	UC Santa Barbara	0
5	UC San Diego	3
3	UC Irvine	3
6	CSUN	1

Semifinals; Friday, April 25
1	Hawai'i	3
5	UC San Diego	1
2	Long Beach State	3
3	UC Irvine	0

Championship; Saturday, April 26
1	Hawai'i	2
2	Long Beach State	3
