= 2026 UC Irvine Anteaters men's volleyball team =

American college men's volleyball season

2026 UC Irvine Anteaters men's volleyball

NCAA Runner-up
- Conference: Big West Conference

Ranking
- Coaches: No. 2
- Record: 21–9 (5–5 Big West)
- Head coach: David Kniffin (14th season)
- Assistant coach: Michael Brinkley (3rd season)
- Home stadium: Bren Events Center; Crawford Hall

The 2026 UC Irvine Anteaters men's volleyball team was the varsity intercollegiate volleyball program of the University of California, Irvine. The Anteaters, led by head coach David Kniffin, played their home games in the Bren Events Center located on campus in Irvine, California. UC Irvine has been a member of the Big West Conference since the 2017–18 season, when the league began sponsoring the sport. The Anteaters begun the season ranked sixth in the nation. This year was also the first year that twelve teams had a chance to play in the NCAA men's volleyball tournament, as the NCAA expanded the tournament to accommodate the sport's growth.

Due to the expansion of the tournament, UC Irvine was granted an at-large bid to the UCLA regional, and played Penn State in the regional round, where they won 3–2. Thus, UC Irvine went on to play UCLA in the regional finals, where they upset the No. 1 seed 3–2. This marked their first win against UCLA since 2017. UC Irvine played Ball State in the semifinals for a chance to play for their fifth national championship, winning 3–1. The Anteaters took on Hawai'i in the NCAA finals, a team the squad has not beaten since 2024. They also lost this match, falling 1–3. This is the first time in program history the Anteaters have lost in a national championship game.

2026 Big West Conference men's volleyball standings
	Conf.				Overall
Team	W		L	PCT	W		L	PCT
No. 1 Hawaii †y ‍‍‍	9	–	1	.900	30	–	5	.857
No. 4 Long Beach State ‡y ‍‍‍	8	–	2	.800	25	–	5	.833
No. 2 UC Irvine y ‍‍‍	5	–	5	.500	21	–	9	.700
No. 10 UC Santa Barbara ‍‍‍	5	–	5	.500	14	–	12	.538
No. 11 UC San Diego ‍‍‍	3	–	7	.300	13	–	14	.481
No. 18 Cal State Northridge ‍‍‍	0	–	10	.000	12	–	15	.444
† – Conference champion ‡ – Big West tournament champion y – Invited to the NCAA tournament As of May 12, 2026; Rankings from AVCA

== Previous season ==
Last season, UC Irvine finished with a 21–7 record, going 6–4 in the Big West, and finished third in the conference. They did not receive an at-large bid to the 2025 NCAA men's volleyball tournament while being ranked fourth in the nation at the time. The Anteaters fell to eventual 2025 Big West tournament champions, Hawai'i, 1–3. UC Irvine finished the season ranked fifth in the nation following the tournament's conclusion.

== Preseason ==
Both the preseason All-Big West team, and the Big West Coaches' Poll were released on December 29, 2025. UC Irvine did not have any players make the preseason team.

=== Big West Coaches' Poll ===
Coaches' Poll
Pos.	Team	Points
1	Long Beach State	24 (4)
2	Hawai'i	22 (2)
3	UC Irvine	17
T-4	CSUN	9
T-4	UC San Diego	9
T-4	UC Santa Barbara	9

== Roster ==
2026 UC Irvine Anteaters Roster
No.	Name	Position	Height	Year	Hometown
1	Shane Aitken	L	6'0"	R-So.	San Clemente, Calif.
2	Micah Tumas	S	6'7"	R-Fr.	West Palm Beach, FL
3	Aidan Rigg	S	6'6"	R-So.	Honolulu, HI
4	Andon Kiriakou	OPP	6'2"	Jr.	Toronto, Canada
5	William D'Arcy	OPP	6'10"	Sr.	Brisbane, Queensland, Australia
6	Tim Ennis	OH	6'4"	So.	Scotch Plains, NJ
7	Micah Goss	MB	6'6"	So.	Santa Barbara, Calif.
8	Lukas Winn	MB	6'6"	So.	Castro, Valley, Calif.
9	Andrej Jokanovic	OH	6'7"	Fr.	Cannes, France
10	Nicolas Restrepo	MB	6'9"	R-So.	Camarillo, Calif.
11	Kobe Brown	MB	6'9"	R-So.	Petaluma, Calif.
12	Trevor Clark	OH/OPP	6'10"	Jr.	Lake Elsinore, Calif.
13	Beck Weber	MB	6'8"	R-Jr.	Long Beach, Calif.
15	Cameron Kosty	S/OPP	6'5"	R-Fr.	Hayward, Calif.
16	Aidan Cuppett	OH	6'3"	So.	Los Altos, Calif
19	Alec Apelian	MB	6'7"	So.	Irvine, Calif.
23	Andreas Brinck	—	6'10"	Fr.	Vaerloesse, Denmark
27	Aidan Schulten	S	5'8"	R-Jr.	Seal Beach, Calif.

=== Coaches ===
2026 UC Irvine Anteaters Coaching Staff
Position	Name	Season
Head Coach	David Kniffin	14th
Assistant Coach	Michael Brinkley	3rd

== Schedule ==
Legend
	Anteaters win
	Anteaters loss
	Postponement
*	Non-Conference Game

2026 UC Irvine Anteaters Men's Volleyball Game Log (21–9)
Regular season (17–7)

January (9–0)
Date	TV	Opponent	Rank	Stadium	Score	Sets	Attendance	Overall	BWC
UC Santa Barbara Invitational
January 8	ESPN+	vs. Harvard*	No. 6	The Thunderdome; Santa Barbara, California	3–0	(25–17, 25–16, 25–13)	150	1–0	—
January 9	ESPN+	vs. Kentucky State*	No. 6	The Thunderdome	3–0	(25–9, 25–7, 25–5)	50	2–0	—
January 10	ESPN+	vs. Maryville*	No. 6	The Thunderdome	3–0	(25–16, 25–18, 25–21)	55	3–0	—
January 14	—	No. 18 Princeton*	No. 7	Bren Events Center; Irvine, California	3–0	(25–17, 25–19, 25–10)	1,594	4–0	—
January 16	B1G+	T-No. 3 Pepperdine*	No. 7	Firestone Fieldhouse; Malibu, California	3–1	(25–23, 26–24, 22–25, 25–20)	906	5–0	—
January 23	B1G+/BYUtv	at No. 8 BYU*	No. 5	Smith Fieldhouse; Provo, Utah	3–2	(16–25, 21–25, 26–24, 25–23, 15–13)	4,255	6–0	—
January 24	B1G+/BYUtv	at No. 8 BYU*	No. 5	Smith Fieldhouse	3–2	(25–17, 26–24, 23–25, 23–25, 15–10)	4,301	7–0	—
January 30	—	No. 16 Stanford*	No. 5	Bren Events Center	3–1	(27–25, 23–25, 25–20, 25–13)	1,798	8–0	—
January 31	—	No. 16 Stanford*	No. 5	Bren Events Center	3–2	(25–19, 22–25, 25–20, 19–25, 15–8)	1,742	9–0	—

February (3–2)
Date	TV	Opponent	Rank	Stadium	Score	Sets	Attendance	Overall	BWC
February 4	B1G+	at Vanguard*	No. 5	Freed Center; Costa Mesa, California	3–1	(25–23, 24–26, 25–13, 25–16)	123	10–0	—
February 6	B1G+	at Concordia Irvine*	No. 5	CU Arena; Irvine, California	3–1	(25–22, 23–25, 25–22, 26–24)	227	11–0	—
February 11	—	No. 4 USC*	No. 5	Bren Events Center; Irvine, California	2–3	(26–24, 25–22, 16–25, 19–25, 16–18)	2,120	11–1	—
February 13	B1G+	at No. 4 USC*	No. 5	Galen Center; Los Angeles, California	3–1	(25–20, 25–23, 23–25, 25–23)	1,063	12–1	—
February 27	—	No. 1 UCLA*	No. 4	Bren Events Center	2–3	(22–25, 25–20, 30–28, 22–25, 11–15)	4,133	12–2	—

March (3–1)
Date	TV	Opponent	Rank	Stadium	Score	Sets	Attendance	Overall	BWC
March 11	ESPN+	No. 11 UC Santa Barbara	No. 4	Bren Events Center; Irvine, California	3–1	(25–20, 25–22, 21–25, 26–24)	1,380	13–2	1–0
March 13	ESPN+	at No. 11 UC Santa Barbara	No. 4	The Thunderdome; Santa Barbara, California	2–3	(25–16, 23–25, 25–18, 17–25, 15–17)	0	13–3	1–1
March 27	ESPN+	No. 13 UC San Diego	No. 5	Bren Events Center	3–0	(25–20, 26–24, 29–27)	1,016	14–3	2–1
March 28	ESPN+	at No. 13 UC San Diego	No. 5	Lion Tree Arena; La Jolla, California	3–2	(25–23, 19–25, 23–25, 25–15, 15–13)	924	15–3	3–1

April (2–4)
Date	TV	Opponent	Rank	Stadium	Score	Sets	Attendance	Overall	BWC
April 3	ESPN+	No. 2 Hawai'i	No. 5	Bren Events Center; Irvine, California	2–3	(22–25, 25–19, 25–23, 23–25, 16–18)	2,397	15–4	3–2
April 4	ESPN+	No. 2 Hawai'i	No. 5	Bren Events Center	0–3	(22–25, 22–25, 22–25)	3,067	15–5	3–3
April 9	ESPN+	No. 18 CSUN	No. 6	Bren Events Center	3–1	(25–17, 23–25, 27–25, 25–19)	1,132	16–5	4–3
April 11	ESPN+	at No. 18 CSUN	No. 6	The Matadome; Northridge, California	3–0	(25–23, 25–18, 25–18)	417	17–5	5–3
April 17	ESPN+	at No. 3 Long Beach State	No. 5	Walter Pyramid; Long Beach, California	2–3	(17–25, 21–25, 26–24, 25–21, 9–15)	2,816	17–6	5–4
April 18	ESPN+	No. 3 Long Beach State	No. 5	Bren Events Center	1–3	(19–25, 13–25, 25–20, 23–25)	2,887	17–7	5–5

Postseason (4–2)

Big West Tournament (1–1)
Date	TV	Opponent	Rank	Stadium	Score	Sets	Attendance	Record	Postseason Record
April 23	SSN/ESPN+	vs. No. 18 CSUN (6); Quarterfinals	No. 5 (3)	Bren Events Center; Irvine, California	3–1	(25–20, 20–25, 25–16, 25–23)	2,964	18–7	1–0
April 24	SSN/ESPN+	vs. No. 3 Long Beach State (2); Semifinals	No. 5 (3)	Bren Events Center	0–3	(27–29, 16–25, 18–25)	3,444	18–8	1–1

NCAA tournament (3–1)
Date	TV	Opponent	Rank	Stadium	Score	Sets	Attendance	Record	NCAA Tournament Record
May 1	ESPN+	No. 15 Penn State (9); Regional Round	No. 6 (8)	Pauley Pavilion; Los Angeles, CA	3–2	(25–18, 27–29, 19–25, 25–17, 15–13)	610	19–8	1–0
May 2	ESPN+	No. 1 UCLA (1); Regional Final	No. 6 (8)	Pauley Pavilion	3–2	(25–23, 19–25, 25–23, 19–25, 16–14)	1,673	20–8	2–0
May 9	ESPN+	No. 7 Ball State (4); Semifinals	No. 6 (8)	Pauley Pavilion	3–1	(25–19, 23–25, 27–25, 25–19)	9,409	21–8	3–0
May 11	ESPN2	No. 3 Hawai'i (2); Finals	No. 6 (8)	Pauley Pavilion	1–3	(25–15, 18–25, 18–25, 20–25)	8,414	21–9	3–1
*Non-conference game. ^{#}Rankings from AVCA Poll. (#) Tournament seedings in parentheses. All times are in Pacific.

== Awards ==
On May 8, the AVCA awards were released, awarding newcomer of the year, player of the year, coach of the year, assistant coach of the year, and the All-American teams to players and coaches across the country.

AVCA Newcomer of the Year
Player	No.	Position	Class
Andrej Jokanovic	9	Outside Hitter	Freshman

AVCA All-American Team
Award	Player	No.	Position	Class
First Team	Shane Aitken	1	Libero	RS Sophomore
Second Team	Trevor Clark	12	Outside Hitter/Opposite	Junior
Second Team	Andrej Jokanovic	9	Outside Hitter	Freshman
Honorable Mention	William D'Arcy	5	Opposite	Senior
Honorable Mention	Micah Goss	7	Middle Blocker	Sophomore
Honorable Mention	Cameron Kosty	15	Setter/Opposite	Freshman

Andrej Jokanovic won the Big West Freshman of the Year award for his performance this year, revealed on April 28.

Big West Freshman of the Year
Player	No.	Position
Andrej Jokanovic	9	Outside Hitter

The postseason All-Big West team was released on April 22, 2026, a day prior to the beginning of the Big West tournament. The Big West All-Freshman team was released at the same time.

All-Big West Team
Award	Player	No.	Position	Class
First Team	William D'Arcy	5	Opposite	Senior
First Team	Andrej Jokanovic	9	Outside Hitter	Freshman
Honorable Mention	Shane Aitken	1	Libero	RS Sophomore
Honorable Mention	Trevor Clark	12	Outside Hitter/Opposite	Junior

Big West All-Freshman Team
Player	No.	Position
Andrej Jokanovic	9	Outside Hitter
Cameron Kosty	15	Setter/Opposite

== Rankings ==
Ranking movements Legend: ██ Increase in ranking ██ Decrease in ranking ( ) = First-place votes
	Week																	
Poll	Pre	1	2	3	4	5	6	7	8	9	10	11	12	13	14	15	16	Final
AVCA	6	7	5	5 (1)	5	5	4	4	4	4	5	5	5	6	5	5	6	2
