= 2026 Cal State Northridge Matadors men's volleyball team =

American collegiate volleyball team season

2026 Cal State Northridge Matadors men's volleyball
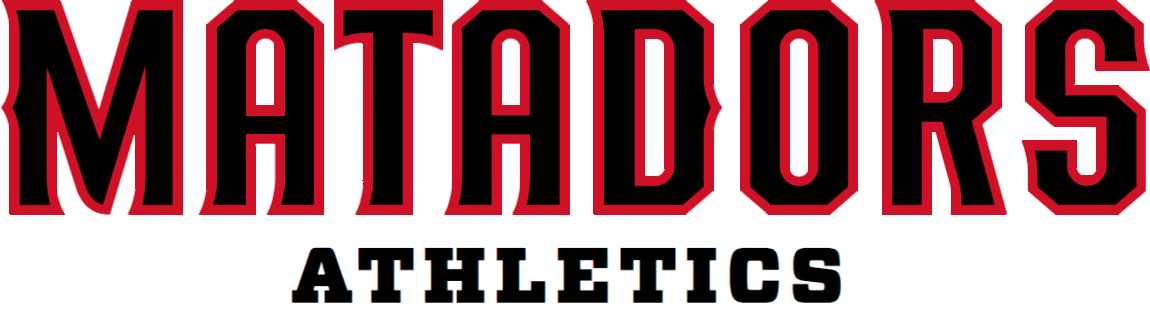
- Conference: Big West Conference

Ranking
- Coaches: No. 18
- Record: 12-12 (0-8 Big West)
- Head coach: Theo Edwards (4th season)
- Assistant coaches: Ryan Mason (4th season); Michael Arone (22nd season); Bryan Bran (2nd season)
- Home arena: The Matadome

The 2026 Cal State Northridge Matadors men's volleyball team is the varsity intercollegiate volleyball program of the California State University, Northridge (CSUN). The Matadors, led by Coach Theo Edwards, play their home games in the Matadome located on the campus in Northridge, California. Cal State Northridge has been a member of the Big West Conference since 2001. CSUN began the season ranked No. 11 in the AVCA preseason coaches poll. The 2026 season marks the first year in which the NCAA men's volleyball tournament will feature twelve teams, expanded to reflect the sport's continued growth.

2026 Big West Conference men's volleyball standings
	Conf.				Overall
Team	W		L	PCT	W		L	PCT
No. 1 Hawaii †y ‍‍‍	9	–	1	.900	30	–	5	.857
No. 4 Long Beach State ‡y ‍‍‍	8	–	2	.800	25	–	5	.833
No. 2 UC Irvine y ‍‍‍	5	–	5	.500	21	–	9	.700
No. 10 UC Santa Barbara ‍‍‍	5	–	5	.500	14	–	12	.538
No. 11 UC San Diego ‍‍‍	3	–	7	.300	13	–	14	.481
No. 18 Cal State Northridge ‍‍‍	0	–	10	.000	12	–	15	.444
† – Conference champion ‡ – Big West tournament champion y – Invited to the NCAA tournament As of May 12, 2026; Rankings from AVCA

== Previous season ==
The Matadors finished the 2025 season 18-11, going 3-7 in Big West play and finished sixth in the conference. In the 2025 Big West Tournament, the Matadors ended their season with a five set loss to the UC Irvine Anteaters.

== Preseason ==
Both the preseason All-Big West team and the Big West Coaches' Poll were released on December 29, 2025. Cal State Northridge was picked to finish tied for fourth along with UC San Diego and UC Santa Barbara, and had one player make the preseason team.

=== Big West Coaches' Poll ===
Coaches' Poll
Pos.	Team	Points
1	Long Beach State	24 (4)
2	Hawai'i	22 (2)
3	UC Irvine	17
T-4	CSUN	9
T-4	UC San Diego	9
T-4	UC Santa Barbara	9

Preseason All-Big West Team
Player	No.	Position	Class
Jallin Philips	18	Opposite	Redshirt Junior

== Roster ==
2026 CSUN Matadors Roster
No.	Name	Position	Height	Year	Hometown
1	Stilian Delibosov	MB	6'6"	So.	Rozlog, Bulgaria
2	Jordan Lucas	OH	6'3"	R-Jr.	Haciendo Height, Calif.
3	Benjamin Cohen	L	5'9"	R-So.	Rosevile, Calif.
4	Malcon King	MB	6'5"	R-Jr.	Long Beach, Calif.
5	Joao Avila	OH	6'1"	So.	Rio de Janeiro, Brazil
6	Hank Kaufman	OH	6'5"	R-So.	Santa Clarita, Calif.
7	Logan Spencer	S	6'0"	R-Fr.	Colorado Springs, Colo.
8	Chris Karnezis	L	6'1"	R-Jr.	Park Ridge, Ill.
9	Shan Nhem	MB	6'4"	Sr.	Union City, Calif.
10	Owen Douphner	S	6'7"	R-So.	Stevenson Ranch, Calif.
11	Kingston Jerome	S	6'6"	Fr.	Los Vegas, Nev.
12	Boaz Serson	OH	6'4"	So.	Kfar Saba, Israel
13	Santiago Mendoza	OH	6'4"	R-Jr.	Asuncian, Paraguay
14	Nial Finnegan	MB	6'6"	R-Jr.	San Mateo, Calif.
15	Nir Eitan	MB	6'6"	Jr.	Tel-Mond, Israel
17	Joel Eanes	OPP	6'9"	Fr.	Virginia Beach, Va.
18	Jalen Philips	OPP	6'5"	R-Jr.	Anaheim, Calif.
20	Joao Favarim	MB	6'7"	So.	Curitiba, Brazil
21	Noah Douphner	OH	6'7"	Fr.	Stevenson Ranch, Calif.
22	Braden Pool-Harris	L	5'11"	So.	Long Beach, Calif.
23	Grayson Albers	OH	6'7"	OH	Sacramento, Calif.

=== Coaches ===
2026 CSUN Matadors Coaching Staff
Position	Name	Season
Head Coach	Theo Edwards	4th
Assistant coach 1	Ryan Mason	4th
Assistant coach 2	Michael Arone	22nd
Assistant coach 3	Bryan Bran	2nd

== Schedule ==
2026 CSUN Matadors Schedule 12-12 (0-8 BW)
Date Time	TV Radio	Opponents	Rank	Stadiums	Scores	Sets	Attendance	Overall	Big West
UCSB ASICS Invitational
Jan. 8 7:00 pm	ESPN+	Maryville	No. 11	Rob Gym Santa Barbara, CA	W, 3-1	25-23 25-20 23-25 25-21	80	1-0	—
Jan. 9 2:00 pm	ESPN+	Harvard	No. 11	Rob Gym Santa Barbara, CA	W, 3-1	25-16 25-19 26-28 25-18	0	2-0	—
Jan 10 4:30 pm	ESPN+	Kentucky State	No. 11	Rob Gym Santa Barbara, CA	W, 3-0	25-10 25-10 25-21	40	3-0	—
Under Armor Challenge
Jan 16 5:00 pm	ESPN+	@ Lindenwood	No. 12	Robert Hyland Arena St. Charles, MO	L, 1-3	25-23 28-30 26-28 20-25	261	3-1	—
Jan. 17 2:00 pm	Not Televised	Purdue For Wayne	No. 12	Robert Hyland Arena St. Charles, MO	W, 3-1	35-33 25-17 24-26 25-16	71	4-1	—
Jan. 21 6:00 pm	ESPN+	Long Island	No. 16	The Matadome Northridge, CA	W, 3-0	25-22 25-17 25-20	352	5-1	—
Jan 26 6:00 pm	ESPN+	Fort Valley State	No. 17	The Matadome Northridge, CA	W, 3-0	25-16 25-22 25-14	302	6-1	—
Jan. 30 6:00 pm	ESPN+	Edward Waters	No. 17	The Matadome Northridge, CA	W, 3-0	25-14 25-17 25-19	308	7-1	—
Feb. 4 7:00 pm	B1G+	@ No. 4 USC	No. 16	Galen Center Los Angeles, CA	L, 2-3	19-25 20-25 25-19 25-17 13-15	649	7-2	—
Feb. 6 6:00 pm	ESPN+	No. 6 Pepperdine	No. 16	The Matadome Northridge, CA	L, 0-3	22-25 18-25 10-25	480	7-3	—
Feb. 13 7:00 pm	B1G+	@ No. 1 UCLA	No. 17	Pauley Pavilion Los Angeles, CA	L, 0-3	18-25 20-25 22-25	1057	7-4	—
Feb. 18 6:00 pm	ESPN+	No. 19 LMU	No. 17	The Matadome Northridge, CA	W, 3-0	25-8 25-18 25-20	265	8-4	—
Feb. 20 6:00 pm	Not Televised	UC Merced	No. 17	The Matadome Northridge, CA	W, 3-0	25-17 25-18 25-15	335	9-4	—
Feb. 27 6:00 pm	Not Televised	Cal Lutheran	No. 17	The Matadome Northridge, CA	W, 3-0	25-21 25-21 25-13	219	10-4	—
Mar. 3 7:00 pm	ESPN+	@ No. 11 UC San Diego Big West	No. 17	LionTree Arena La Jolla, CA	L, 0-3	19-25 17-25 24-26	400	10-5	0-1
Mar. 11 6:00 pm	ESPN+	Princeton	No. 17	The Matadome Northridge, CA	W, 3-1	25-19 21-25 25-19 25-21	230	11-5	0-1
Mar. 13 6:00 pm	ESPN+	No. 12 UC San Diego Big West	No. 17	The Matadome Northridge, CA	L, 2-3	25-18 19-25 22-25 25-21 13-15	203	11-6	0-2
Mar. 19 6:00 pm	ESPN+	Jessup	No. 17	The Matadome Northridge, CA	W, 3-1	23-25 25-20 25-16 25-23	245	12-6	0-2
Big West Conference Matches
Mar. 27 6:00 pm	ESPN+	No. 3 Long Beach State	No. 18	The Matadome Northridge, CA	L, 2-3	20-25 25-20 25-21 18-25 11-15	388	12-7	0-3
Mar. 28 7:00	ESPN+	@ No. 3 Long Beach State	No. 18	Walter Pyramid Long Beach, CA	L, 0-3	21-25 16-25 14-25	1571	12-8	0-4
Apr. 2 7:00 pm	ESPN+	@ No. 8 UC Santa Barbara	No. 18	The Thunderdome Santa Barbara, CA	L, 0-3	19-25 19-25 22-25	519	12-9	0-5
Apr. 4 6:00 pm	ESPN+	No. 8 UC Santa Barbara	No. 18	The Matadome Northridge, CA	L, 1-3	19-25 25-17 18-25 26-28	435	12-10	0-6
Apr. 9 6:00 pm	ESPN+	@ No. 6 UC Irvine	No. 18	Bren Events Center Irvine, CA	L, 1-3	17-25 25-23 25-27 19-25	1132	12-11	0-7
Apr. 11 6:00 pm	ESPN+	No. 6 UC Irvine	No. 18	The Matadome Northridge, CA	L, 0-3	23-25 18-25 18-25	417	12-12	0-8
Apr. 17 10:00 pm	SPEC/ESPN+	@ No. 2 Hawaii	No. 18	Stan Sheriff Center Honolulu, HI	L, 0-3	20-25 16-25 16-25	8069	12-13	0-9
Apr. 18 10:00 pm	SPEC/ESPN+	@ No. 2 Hawaii	No. 18	Stan Sheriff Center Honolulu, HI	L, 1-3	15-25 25-21 14-25 16-25	9360	12-14	0-10
The Hawaiian Islands presents the 2026 OUTRIGGER Big West Men’s Volleyball Championship
Apr 23 5:00 pm	SPEC/ESPN+	(3) No. 5 UC Irvine (Quarterfinals)	(6) No. 18	Bren Events Center Irvine, CA	L, 1-3	20-25 25-20 16-25 23-25	2964	12-15	—

Time: Pacific Standard Time

== Awards ==
=== Regular Season Awards ===
Regular Season Awards
Date	Award	Player	No.	Position	Class
January
Jan. 26	Setter of the Week	Owen Douphner	10	Setter	RS Sophomore
February
Feb. 2	Freshman of the Week	Grayson Albers	23	Outside Hitter	RS Freshman
Feb. 9	Offensive Player of the Week	Jordan Lucas	2	Outside Hitter	RS Junior
Feb. 23	Freshman of the Week	Grayson Albers	23	Outside Hitter	RS Freshman
Feb. 23	Offensive Player of the Week	Jalen Phillips	18	Opposite	RS Junior

=== Post Season Awards ===
The postseason All-Big West team was released on April 22, 2026, a day prior to the beginning of the Big West tournament. The Big West All-Freshman team was released at the same time.

All-Big West Team
Award	Player	No.	Position	Class
First Team	Jalen Phillips	18	Opposite	RS Junior
Honorable Mention	Owen Douphner	10	Setter	RS Sophomore

All-Freshman Team
Player	No.	Position
Grayson Albers	18	Outside Hitter
Noah Douphner	21	Outside Hitter

== Rankings ==
	Weeks																	
Poll	Pre	1	2	3	4	5	6	7	8	9	10	11	12	13	14	15	16	Final
AVCA	11	12	16	17	16	17	17	17	17	17	17	18	18	18	18	18		
