= 2026 Long Beach State Beach men's volleyball team =

American college volleyball season

2026 Long Beach State Beach men's volleyball
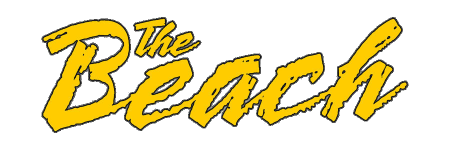

Big West Tournament Champions

NCAA tournament, Semifinals, L 1–3
- Conference: Big West Conference

Ranking
- Coaches: No. 4
- Record: 25–5 (8–2 Big West)
- Head coach: Nick MacRae (1st season)
- Assistant coaches: McKay Smith (6th season); Amir Lugo-Rodriguez (1st season); Matt Prosser (1st season)
- Home arena: Walter Pyramid; Gold Mine

The 2026 Long Beach State Beach men's volleyball team represents Long Beach State University in the 2026 NCAA Division I & II men's volleyball season. The Beach, led by first-year head coach Nick MacRae, play their home games at Walter Pyramid. Long Beach began the season ranked second in the nation. This is the first year since 2012 that Alan Knipe did not coach the team. Previously Knipe had coached the team from 2001 to 2009. The Beach compete as members of the Big West Conference. This year is also the first year that twelve teams will have a chance to play in the NCAA men's volleyball tournament, as the NCAA expanded the tournament to accommodate the sport's growth.

2026 Big West Conference men's volleyball standings
	Conf.				Overall
Team	W		L	PCT	W		L	PCT
No. 1 Hawaii †y ‍‍‍	9	–	1	.900	30	–	5	.857
No. 4 Long Beach State ‡y ‍‍‍	8	–	2	.800	25	–	5	.833
No. 2 UC Irvine y ‍‍‍	5	–	5	.500	21	–	9	.700
No. 10 UC Santa Barbara ‍‍‍	5	–	5	.500	14	–	12	.538
No. 11 UC San Diego ‍‍‍	3	–	7	.300	13	–	14	.481
No. 18 Cal State Northridge ‍‍‍	0	–	10	.000	12	–	15	.444
† – Conference champion ‡ – Big West tournament champion y – Invited to the NCAA tournament As of May 12, 2026; Rankings from AVCA

== Previous season ==
In 2025, the Long Beach State Beach lost to Hawai'i in the Big West Conference tournament 1–3. The team then received an at-large bid to the NCAA tournament, and went on to win the national championship versus UCLA, winning in three straight sets. This is their fourth men's volleyball NCAA championship, and their first since their back-to-back wins in 2018 and 2019.

== Preseason ==
Both the preseason All-Big West team, and the Big West Coaches' Poll were released on December 29, 2025. The Beach was picked to finish first, and had two players make the preseason team.

Preseason All-Big West Team
Player	No.	Position	Class
Alex Kandev	12	Outside Hitter	Sophomore
Skyler Varga	4	Opposite Hitter	Redshirt Senior

=== Big West Coaches' Poll ===
Coaches' Poll
Pos.	Team	Points
1	Long Beach State	24 (4)
2	Hawai'i	22 (2)
3	UC Irvine	17
T-4	CSUN	9
T-4	UC San Diego	9
T-4	UC Santa Barbara	9

== Roster ==
2026 Long Beach State Beach Roster
No.	Name	Position	Height	Year	Hometown
1	Jackson Cryst	MB	6'10"	Fr.	Long Beach, Calif.
2	Myles Jordan	OH	6'5"	Fr.	Houston, Texas
4	Skyler Varga	OH	6'7"	Sr.	Muenster, Saskatchewan
5	Isaiah Preuitt	MB	6'7"	So.	Happy Valley, Ore
6	Ben Braun	MB	6'11"	Sr.	Rancho Mirage, Calif.
8	Jette Estes	OH	6'3"	R-Fr.	Los Alamitos, Calif.
10	Connor Bloom	OH/OPP	6'5"	Sr.	Huntington Beach, Calif.
11	Kellen Larson	L	5'10"	So.	Irvine, Calif.
12	Alex Kandev	OH	6'7"	So.	Sofie Bulgaria
13	Island Doty	MB	6'5"	Sr.	Colorado Spring, Colo.
17	Dane Hillis	OH	6'3"	Sr	San Clemente, Calif.
21	Braedon Marquardt	MB	6'5"	So.	Anaheim Hills, Calif.
25	Ryan Peluso	OPP/S	6'2"	Jr.	Orlando, Fla.
26	Jake Pazanti	S	6'3"	R-Fr.	Huntington Beach, Calif.
31	Daniil Hershynovich	OPP	6'9"	Jr	Toronto, Ontario
34	Nate Baddeley	OH	6'5"	So.	Seal Beach, Calif.
45	Wojciech Gajek	OPP	6'6"	Fr.	Katowice, Polad

=== Coaches ===
2026 Long Beach State Beach Coaching Staff
Position	Name	Season
Head Coach	Nick MacRae	1st
Assistant coach 1	McKay Smith	6th
Assistant coach 2	Amir Lugo-Rodriguez	1st
Assistan coach 3	Matt Prosser	1st

== Schedule ==
Legend
	Beach win
	Beach loss
	Postponement
*	Non-Conference Game

2026 Long Beach State Beach Men's Volleyball Game Log (25–5)
Regular season (22–4)

January (8–0)
Date	TV	Opponent	Rank	Stadium	Score	Sets	Attendance	Overall	BWC
Exhibition - North American Challenge
January 2	-	Calgary*	No. 3	Walter Pyramid; Long Beach, California	3–0	(25–10, 25–14, 25–23)	1,510	–	—
January 4	-	Calgary*	No. 3	Walter Pyramid	3–0	(25–18, 25–18, 25–15)	256	–	—
January 4	-	Alberta*	No. 3	Walter Pyramid	3–1	(25–19, 25–27, 25–13, 25–19)	1,219	–	—
January 9	ESPN+	Lindenwood*	No. 3	Walter Pyramid	3–0	(25–21, 25–16, 25–20)	1,414	1–0	—
January 10	ESPN+	No. 15 McKendree	No. 3	Walter Pyramid	3–0	(25–22, 35–33, 25–16)	1,435	2–0	—
January 14	ESPN+	at Central State*	No. 2	Beacom/Lewis Gymnasium; Wilberforce, Ohio	3–0	(25–14, 25–10, 25–20)	30	3–0	—
January 16	ESPN+	vs No. 20 George Mason*	No. 2	Covelli Center; Columbus, Ohio	3–0	(25–21, 25–16, 25–15)	231	4–0	—
January 17	ESPN+	at T-No. 13 Ohio State*	No. 2	Covelli Center	3–1	(21–25, 25–18, 25–18, 25–20)	1,670	5-0	—
January 23	ESPN+	Fort Valley State*	No. 2	Walter Pyramid	3–0	(25–13, 25–19, 25–10)	1,650	6–0	—
January 24	ESPN+	Long Island*	No. 2	Walter Pyramid	3–0	(25–18, 25–15, 25–15)	1,766	7–0	—
January 30	B1G+	at No. 6 Pepperdine*	No. 2	Firestone Fieldhouse; Malibu, California	3–1	(25–20, 20–25, 30–28, 27–25)	937	8–0	—

February (3–2)
Date	TV	Opponent	Rank	Stadium	Score	Sets	Attendance	Overall	BWC
February 6	ESPN+	No. 1 UCLA*	No. 2	Walter Pyramid; Long Beach, California	2–3	(25–16, 25–22, 22–25, 19–25, 10–15)	4,252	8–1	—
February 14	ESPN+	Vanguard*	No. 2	Walter Pyramid	3–0	(25–21, 25–16, 26–24)	1,581	9–1	—
February 20	B1G+	at No. 1 UCLA*	No. 2	Pauley Pavilion; Los Angeles, California	1–3	(15–25, 25–23, 25–27, 24–26)	4,842	9–2	—
February 27	ESPN+	at Concordia Irvine*	No. 2	CU Arena; Irvine, California	3–1	(19–25, 25–17, 25–18, 25–14)	250	10–2	—
February 28	ESPN+	Concordia Irvine*	No. 2	Walter Pyramid	3–0	(25–17, 25–23, 25–21)	1,721	11–2	—

March (5–2)
Date	TV	Opponent	Rank	Stadium	Score	Sets	Attendance	Overall	BWC
March 7	ESPN+	No. 16 Penn State	No. 2	Walter Pyramid; Long Beach, California	3–0	(26–24, 25–18, 25–19)	2,855	12–2	—
March 12	ESPN+	Jessup*	No. 2	Walter Pyramid	3–0	(25–13, 25–18, 25–16)	1,206	13–2	—
March 13	ESPN+	Jessup*	No. 2	Walter Pyramid	3–0	(25–20, 25–20, 25–14)	1,338	14–2	—
March 20	ESPN+	No. 3 Hawai'i	No. 2	Walter Pyramid	2–3	(24–26, 25–23, 19–25, 25–20, 12–15)	3,680	14–3	0–1
March 21	ESPN+	No. 3 Hawai'i	No. 2	Walter Pyramid	0–3	(18–25, 22–25, 20–25)	3,723	14–4	0–2
March 27	ESPN+	at No. 18 CSUN	No. 3	The Matadome; Northridge, California	3–2	(25–20, 20–25, 21–25, 25–18, 15–11)	388	15–4	1–2
March 28	ESPN+	No. 18 CSUN	No. 3	Walter Pyramid	3–0	(25–21, 25–16, 25–14)	1,571	16–4	2–2

April (6–0)
Date	TV	Opponent	Rank	Stadium	Score	Sets	Attendance	Overall	BWC
April 3	ESPN+	at No. 13 UC San Diego	No. 3	LionTree Arena; San Diego, California	3–1	(23–25, 29–27, 25–21, 25–20)	958	17–4	3–2
April 4	ESPN+	No. 13 UC San Diego	No. 3	Walter Pyramid; Long Beach, California	3–1	(25–22, 25–15, 31–33, 29–27)	1,841	18–4	4–2
April 10	ESPN+	No. 8 UC Santa Barbara	No. 3	Walter Pyramid	3–0	(25–20, 25–19, 25–20)	2,131	19–4	5–2
April 11	ESPN+	at No. 8 UC Santa Barbara	No. 3	The Thunderdome; Santa Barbara, California	3–0	(25–13, 25–20, 25–21)	1,341	20–4	6–2
April 17	ESPN+	No. 5 UC Irvine	No. 3	Walter Pyramid	3–2	(25–17, 25–21, 24–26, 21–25, 15–9)	2,816	21–4	7–2
April 18	—	at No. 5 UC Irvine	No. 3	Bren Events Center; Irvine, California	3–1	(25–19, 25–13, 20–25, 25–23)	2,887	22–4	8–2

Postseason (3–1)

2026 Big West Tournament (2–0)
Date	TV	Opponent	Rank	Stadium	Score	Sets	Attendance	Record	BWC Tournament Record
April 24	SSN/ESPN+	vs. No. 5 UC Irvine (3); Semifinals	No. 3 (2)	Bren Events Center; Irvine, California	3–0	(29–27, 25–16, 25–18)	3,444	23–4	1–0
April 25	SSN/ESPN+	vs. No. 2 Hawai'i (1); Finals	No. 3 (2)	Bren Events Center	3–2	(20–25, 27–25, 22–25, 30–28, 15–11)	3,501	24–4	2–0

NCAA tournament (1–1)
Date	TV	Opponent	Rank	Stadium	Score	Sets	Attendance	Record	NCAA Tournament Record
May 2	ESPN+	No. 9 Loyola Chicago (6)	No. 2 (3)	Walter Pyramid; Long Beach, CA	3–0	(25–21, 25–21, 25–19)	1,716	25–4	1–0
May 9	ESPN+	No. 3 Hawai'i (2)	No. 2 (3)	Walter Pyramid; Long Beach, CA	1–3	(15–25, 25–18, 21–25, 22–25)	9,409	25–5	1–1
*Non-conference game. ^{#}Rankings from AVCA Poll. (#) Tournament seedings in parentheses. All times are in Pacific.

== Rankings ==
Ranking movements Legend: ██ Increase in ranking ██ Decrease in ranking ( ) = First-place votes
	Week																	
Poll	Pre	1	2	3	4	5	6	7	8	9	10	11	12	13	14	15	16	Final
AVCA	3 (5)	2 (4)	2 (3)	2 (2)	2 (2)	2 (1)	2 (1)	2	2	2	2	3	3	3	3	3	2	4
