= UC Merced Bobcats =

- University: University of California, Merced
- Nickname: Bobcats
- NCAA: Division II
- Conference: CCAA (primary); MPSF (men's volleyball); WWPA (men and women's water polo)
- Location: Merced, California
- First year: 2011
- Varsity teams: 12 (6 men's, 6 women's)
- Basketball arena: Gallo Recreation Center
- Colors: Royal Blue and Gold
- Mascot: Rufus
- Website: www.ucmercedbobcats.com

The UC Merced Bobcats are the intercollegiate athletics teams that represent the University of California, Merced (UCM), located in Merced, California. The Bobcats primarily compete in NCAA Division II as a member of the California Collegiate Athletic Association (CCAA).

== History ==
On April 19, 2011, the National Association of Intercollegiate Athletics (NAIA) made UC Merced one of four new members to join the organization. On May 6, 2011, the Bobcats were made official members of the CalPac. The school colors are royal blue and gold.

The Bobcats played intercollegiate sports as a member of the National Association of Intercollegiate Athletics (NAIA), primarily competing in the California Pacific Conference (Cal Pac) starting in the 2011–12 academic year.

In November 2023, UC Merced was invited to join the California Collegiate Athletic Association (CCAA), and were approved by the NCAA to join the NCAA Division II level. They began play and reclassification in the fall of 2025.

== Varsity teams ==
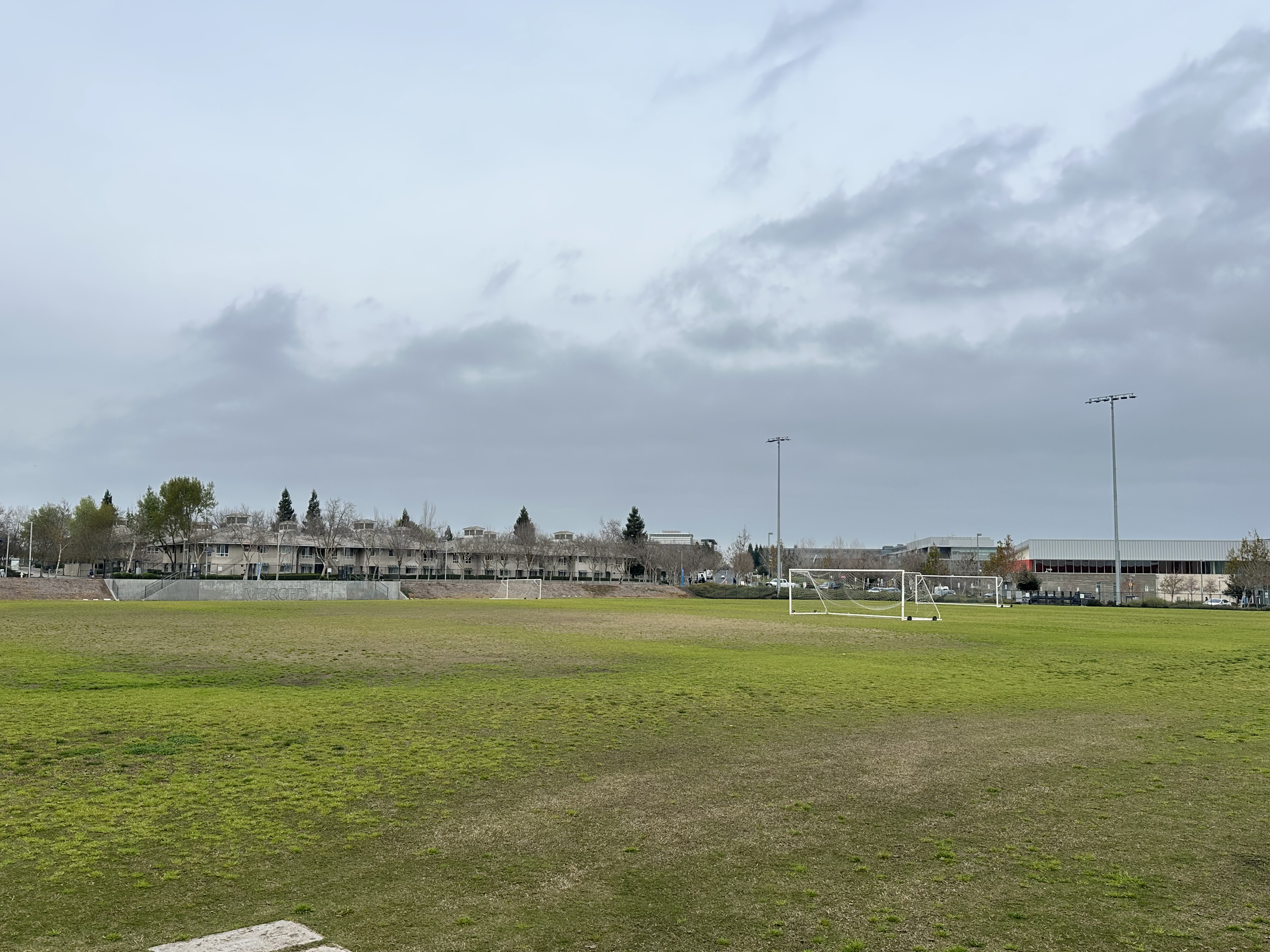
Recreation Field on the UC Merced Campus

All of UC Merced's intercollegiate sports teams compete in the California Collegiate Athletic Association. The UC Merced Recreation and Athletics Department sponsors twelve intercollegiate varsity sports. Men's sports include basketball, cross country, soccer, volleyball, waterpolo and outdoor track and field; while women's sports include basketball, cross country, soccer, volleyball, waterpolo and outdoor track and field.

Men's sports	Women's sports
Basketball	Basketball
Cross country	Cross country
Soccer	Soccer
Track	Track
Volleyball	Volleyball
Water polo	Water polo

== Club/intramural sports ==
The UC Merced Recreation and Athletics Department sponsors Club sports, including: archery, the Bobcat Dance Team, cheer, tennis, golf, and softball as of now. The university plans on adding more ICA and Club teams as the school progresses.

Intramural sports include a wide array of sports such as basketball, ultimate frisbee, flag football, dodgeball, grass volleyball, indoor volleyball, table tennis, soccer, e-sports, archery, etc.
