= 2026 NCAA men's volleyball tournament =

Tournament details
- Dates: May 1-11, 2026
- Teams: 12

Final positions
- Champions: Hawai'i (3rd title)
- Runners-up: UC Irvine

Tournament statistics
- Matches played: 11
- Attendance: 49,878 (4,534 per match)

Awards
- Most Outstanding Player: Louis Sakanoko ^{(Hawai'i)}

The 2026 NCAA men's volleyball tournament was the 55th edition of the NCAA men's volleyball tournament, an annual tournament to determine the national champion of NCAA Division I and Division II men's collegiate indoor volleyball. The single-elimination tournament was competed with a brand new format featuring an expanded 12-team field. The regional weekend took place at four host schools that were awarded seeds 1–4. The semifinals and championship occurred on the second weekend at the previously announced tournament host.

The expansion of the tournament established a new format similar to the women's game. The 7 conference champions and 5 at-large teams participated, a total of 12 teams. The tournament took place over two separate weekends. In the first weekend, seeds 1–4 hosted regions of 3 teams. The top seed in each region had a bye to the region final while two other teams played a regional first round match, with the winners moving on to play the host in the region final. The four region winners then moved on to play during the second weekend. The tournament semifinals and championship occurred on the second weekend on May 9, 2026 and May 11, 2026 at the Pauley Pavilion on the campus of UCLA.

Notably, Saint Francis University made their first and only appearance in the Division I/II men's volleyball tournament, as they will move down to Division III following the conclusion of the 2026 academic year. Both the Big West and the MPSF received three total bids, the MIVA received two total, while the rest had only their tournament champion.

During set five of the game between UCLA and UC Irvine, the potential UCLA match point was overturned in favor of UC Irvine, ultimately leading to UC Irvine winning the match three points later. The overturned call sparked controversy, and led to UCLA Athletic Director Martin Jarmond to request a formal review of the call by the NCAA. The win by UC Irvine also marked the first time since 1993, the year of the formation of the MPSF conference, that no team from the conference would make an appearance in the conference semifinals. Additionally, this marked the first time a No. 1 seed failed to reach the semifinals, as well as the first time UCLA missed the semifinals in 32 appearances.

With UC Irvine's win over Ball State, it marked just the third time in NCAA men's volleyball history the finals matchup would only include Big West teams, the other two being 2019 and 2022, both of which were between Hawai'i and Long Beach State. It also marked the eighth consecutive finals match with at least one Big West team represented, dating back to the conference's inception in 2018. With Hawai'i's win over Long Beach State in the semifinals, it also ended a 14-year trend in which the previous national champion won back-to-back. Finally, prior to this year, UC Irvine had been undefeated in NCAA Championship games.

== Bids ==
The selection show aired live on April 26, 2026 at 4 p.m. ET on NCAA.com. During the show the 12–team field was announced and the dates for the regional tournaments were revealed.

School	Conference	Record	Berth	Source
Long Beach State	Big West	24–4	Tournament champion	
Belmont Abbey	Conference Carolinas	20–5	Tournament champion	
Penn State	EIVA	22–7	Tournament champion	
Ball State	MIVA	25–4	Tournament champion	
UCLA	MPSF	29–1	Tournament champion	
Saint Francis	NEC	18–11	Tournament champion	
Fort Valley State	SIAC	14–12	Tournament champion	
Hawai'i	Big West	27–5	At-large	
Loyola Chicago	MIVA	20–8	At-large	
Pepperdine	MPSF	23–6	At-large	
UC Irvine	Big West	18–8	At-large	
USC	MPSF	19–7	At-large	

== Bracket ==
Regional Round; Friday, May 1 ESPN+
UC Irvine	3
Penn State	2
Pepperdine	3
Fort Valley State	0
USC	3
Belmont Abbey	0
Loyola Chicago	3
Saint Francis	0

Regional Final; Saturday, May 2 ESPN+
1	UCLA	2
UC Irvine	3
4	Ball State	3
Pepperdine	2
2	Hawai'i	3
USC	1
3	Long Beach State	3
Loyola Chicago	0

Semifinals; Saturday, May 9 ESPN+
UC Irvine	3
4	Ball State	1
2	Hawai'i	3
3	Long Beach State	1

National Championship; Monday, May 11; ESPN2
UC Irvine	1
2	Hawai'i	3

== Schedule and results ==
All times Eastern..
All matches except the championship will be streamed on ESPN+. The championship was televised on ESPN2.

Match	Time	Matchup	Location	Score	Attendance	Broadcasters	Referees
Regional Round – Friday, May 1
1	7:00 p.m.	Pepperdine vs. Fort Valley State	Riverview Health Arena (Note: The Ball State regional is unable to be held at Worthen Arena due to commencement ceremonies being held there at the same time.); Noblesville, Indiana; Ball State regional	3–0 (25–16, 25–18, 25–17)	130	Mick Tridow & Tucker Bitting	
2	9:00 p.m.	UC Irvine vs. Penn State	Pauley Pavilion; Los Angeles, California; UCLA regional	3–2 (25–18, 27–29, 19–25, 25–17, 15–13)	610	Bryan Fenley & Victoria Dennis	
3	10:00 p.m.	Loyola Chicago vs. Saint Francis	LBS Financial Credit Union Pyramid; Long Beach, California; Long Beach State regional	3–0 (30–28, 29–27, 25–20)	345	Matt Brown & Andreas Koch	
4	11:00 p.m.	USC vs. Belmont Abbey	Stan Sheriff Center; Honolulu, Hawaii; Hawai'i regional	3–0 (25–18, 25–20, 25–21)	6,620	Tiff Wells & James Anastasiades	
Regional Finals – Saturday, May 2
5	6:00 p.m.	Ball State vs. Pepperdine	Riverview Health Arena; Ball State Regional	3–2 (25–23, 23–25, 25–22, 19–25, 16–14)	1,252	Greg Rakestraw & Tucker Bitting	
6	8:00 p.m.	UCLA vs. UC Irvine	Pauley Pavilion; UCLA regional	2–3 (23–25, 25–19, 23–25, 25–19, 14–16)	1,673	Bryan Fenley & Graham Metzker	Tony Garrvett, Chris Han, Rachel Jensen, & Lara Janjie
7	9:00 p.m.	Long Beach State vs. Loyola Chicago	LBS Financial Credit Union Pyramid; Long Beach State regional	3–0 (25–21, 25–21, 25–19)	1,716	Matt Brown & Andreas Koch	
8	10:00 p.m.	Hawai'i vs. USC	Stan Sheriff Center; Hawai'i regional	3–1 (25–22, 24–26, 25–23, 32–30)	10,300	Howard Dashefsky & Ryan Tsuji	
Semifinals – Saturday, May 9
9	6:30 p.m.	UC Irvine vs. Ball State	Pauley Pavilion	3–1 (25–19, 23–25, 27–25, 25–19)	9,409	Bryan Fenley & Harry Kaseff	Serigo Gonzalez, Chad Zimmerman, Dan Swensen, & Robert Owen
10	9:30 p.m.	Hawai'i vs. Long Beach State	Pauley Pavilion	3–1 (25–15, 18–25, 25–21, 25–22)	9,409	Bryan Fenley & Harry Kaseff	Kryatian Krzyzak, Serigo Gonzalez, Chad Zimmerman, & Dan Swensen
National Championship – Monday, May 11
11	7:00 p.m.	UC Irvine vs. Hawai'i	Pauley Pavilion	1–3 (25–15, 18–25, 18–25, 20–25)	8,414	Anne Marie Anderson & Kevin Barnett	

== All Tournament Team ==
- Patrick Rogers, Ball State
- Skyler Varga, Long Beach State
- Trevor Clark, UC Irvine
- Andrej Jokanovic, UC Irvine
- Trend Rosenthal, Hawai'i
- Kristian Titriyski, Hawai'i
- Louis Sakanoko, Hawai'i (Most Outstanding Player)
