= 2022 Lewis Flyers men's volleyball team =

American college volleyball season

2022 Lewis Flyers men's volleyball
- Conference: Midwestern Intercollegiate Volleyball Association
- Record: 16–12 (7–7 MIVA)
- Head coach: Dan Friend (18th season)
- Assistant coaches: Jacob Kerschner (2nd season); Keith Iverson (4th season)
- Home arena: Neil Carey Arena

The 2022 Lewis Flyers men's volleyball team represented Lewis University in the 2022 NCAA Division I & II men's volleyball season. The Flyers, led by eighteenth year head coach Dan Friend, played their home games at Neil Carey Arena. The Flyers were members of the Midwestern Intercollegiate Volleyball Association and were picked to finish second the MIVA in the preseason poll behind Loyola Chicago. The Flyers ended the season fourth in the MIVA, holding a 2–0 record against Ohio State as the tiebreaker, and lost in the MIVA Semifinals.

2022 Midwestern Intercollegiate Volleyball Association standings
	Conf.				Overall
Team	W		L	PCT	W		L	PCT
No. 3 Ball State ‍†‍‡‍^{y}	12	–	2	.857	23	–	4	.852
No. 12 Loyola Chicago ‍‍‍	11	–	3	.786	18	–	9	.667
McKendree ‍‍‍	9	–	5	.643	14	–	11	.560
No. 14 Lewis ‍‍‍	7	–	7	.500	16	–	12	.571
Ohio State ‍‍‍	7	–	7	.500	13	–	14	.481
No. 15 Purdue Fort Wayne ‍‍‍	6	–	8	.429	17	–	13	.567
Lindenwood ‍‍‍	4	–	10	.286	8	–	14	.364
Quincy ‍‍‍	0	–	14	.000	4	–	19	.174
† – Conference champion ‡ – 2022 MIVA Tournament champion: y- Invited to the NCAA Volleyball Tournament As of March 17, 2025 Rankings from AVCA

== Season highlights ==
- Will be filled in as the season progresses.

== Roster ==
2022 Lewis Flyers roster
Defensive Specialist/Libero: 5 Jason Gibbs - (redshirt) Junior; 11 Ryan Collins - Freshman; 13 Connor Keating - Sophomore; 24 Carlos Jimenez - (redshirt) Senior; Middle blockers: 7 Joe Kenzinger - (redshirt) Senior; 8 Isaac Benka - Freshman; 8 Tyler Mitchem - Graduate; 15 Wesley Yusk - Freshman; 17 Michael Sack - (redshirt) Sophomore; 18 Antonio Rodriguez - (redshirt) Junior	Outside hitters: 1 Cole Brillhart - (redshirt) Junior; 9 Max Roquet - Freshman; 10 Alec Lehnert - (redshirt) Junior; 12 Jared Phelan - (redshirt) Sophomore; 14 Liam Buck - (redshirt) Freshman; 21 Chase Celichhowski - Freshman; 22 John Davis - (redshirt) Sophomore	Opposite hitters: 2 Tyler Simpson - (redshirt) Freshman; 14 Liam Buck - (redshirt) Freshman; 15 Wesley Yusk - Freshman; 19 Carter Burzlaff - (redshirt) Sophomore; 23 Christian Prayer - Junior; Setters: 3 Tyler Morgan - Freshman; 5 Jason Gibbs - (redshirt) Junior; 6 Kevin Kauling - Junior; 19 Carter Burzlaff - (redshirt) Sophomore

== Schedule ==
TV/Internet Streaming information:

All home games will be televised on GLVC SN. All road games will also be streamed on the oppositions streaming service.

Date Time	Opponent	Rank^{(Tournament Seed)}	Arena City (Tournament)	Television	Score	Attendance	Record (MIVA Record)
1/2; 7 p.m.	#12 UC Irvine	#8	Neil Carey Arena; Romeoville, IL	GLVC SN	Canceled- COVID-19		
1/7; 6 p.m.	@ Lincoln Memorial	#8	Mary Mars Gymnasium; Harrogate, TN	Lincoln Memorial SN	Canceled- COVID-19		
1/8; 7 p.m.	@ King	#8	Student Center Complex; Bristol, TN	Coastal Carolinas DN	Canceled- COVID-19		
1/11; 7 p.m.	Maryville	#9	Neil Carey Arena; Romeoville, IL	GLVC SN	W 3–0 (25–13, 25–11, 25–12)	50	1–0
1/14; 7 p.m.	NJIT	#9	Neil Carey Arena; Romeoville, IL	GLVC SN	W 3–1 (25–20, 18–25, 25–17, 25–13)	50	2–0
1/15; 6 p.m.	St. Francis	#9	Neil Carey Arena; Romeoville, IL	GLVC SN	W 3–0 (25–20, 29–27, 25–18)	50	3–0
1/21; 7 p.m.	#5 Long Beach State	#7	Neil Carey Arena; Romeoville, IL	GLVC SN	L 1–3 (22–25, 22–25, 26–24, 20–25)	50	3–1
1/22; 7 p.m.	Belmont Abbey	#7	Neil Carey Arena; Romeoville, IL	GLVC SN	W 3–0 (25–17, 25–15, 25–19)	50	4–1
1/28; 9 p.m.	@ #5 Pepperdine	#7	Firestone Fieldhouse; Malibu, CA	WaveCasts	L 3–0 (19–25, 20–25, 21–25)	476	4–2
1/29; 7 p.m.	@ #2 UCLA	#7	John Wooden Center; Los Angeles, CA	P12+ UCLA	W 3-0 (25–21, 25–20, 25–23)	750	5–2
2/4; 7 p.m.	Central State	#6	Neil Carey Arena; Romeoville, IL	GLVC SN	Canceled- COVID-19		
2/5; 7 p.m.	#8 Grand Canyon	#6	Neil Carey Arena; Romeoville, IL	GLVC SN	W 3–1 (26–24, 19–25, 25–23, 20–25, 15–10)	419	6–2
2/10; 7 p.m.	#10 Ball State*	#6	Neil Carey Arena; Romeoville, IL	GLVC SN	L 0–3 (29–31, 22–25, 20–25)	443	6–3 (0–1)
2/12; 5 p.m.	#12 Ohio State*	#6	Neil Carey Arena; Romeoville, IL	GLVC SN	W 3–1 (25–21, 16–25, 28–26, 25–22)	373	7–3 (1–1)
2/18; 3 p.m.	@ Lindenwood*	#9	Robert F. Hyland Arena; St. Charles, MO	GLVC SN	L 2–3 (25–18, 19–25, 27–29, 25–19, 9–15)	211	7–4 (1–2)
2/19; 7 p.m.	@ Quincy*	#9	Pepsi Arena; Quincy, IL	GLVC SN	W 3–0 (25–18, 25–22, 25–19)	60	8–4 (2–2)
2/24; 6 p.m.	Purdue Fort Wayne*	#10	Neil Carey Arena; Romeoville, IL	GLVC SN	L 0–3 (23–25, 23–25, 22–25)	200	8–5 (2–3)
2/26; 7 p.m.	@ #14 Loyola Chicago*	#10	Joseph J. Gentile Arena; Chicago, IL	NBCS CHIC	L 0–3 (18–25, 22–25, 22–25)	1,097	8–6 (2–4)
3/2; 7 p.m.	Benedictine	#11	Neil Carey Arena; Romeoville, IL	GLVC SN	W 3–0 (25–21, 25–20, 25–20)	301	9–6
3/4; 7 p.m.	Emmanuel	#11	Neil Carey Arena; Romeoville, IL	GLVC SN	W 3–0 (25–18, 25–13, 25–22)	129	10–6
3/10; 11 p.m.	@ #4 Hawai'i	#12	Stan Sheriff Center; Manoa, HI (Outrigger Invitational)	ESPN+	L 0–3 (15–25, 21–25, 19–25)	3,869	10–7
3/12; 11 p.m.	@ #4 Hawai'i	#12	Stan Sheriff Center; Manoa, HI (Outrigger Invitational)	ESPN+	L 1–3 (18–25, 29–27, 19–25, 24–26)	4,362	10–8
3/17; 6 p.m.	McKendree*	#12	Neil Carey Arena; Romeoville, IL	VOR-TV	W 3–1 (24–26, 45–43, 25–16, 25–15)	407	11–8 (3–4)
3/19; 5 p.m.	@ McKendree*	#12	Melvin Price Convocation Center; Lebanon, IL	GLVC SN	L 2–3 (25–19, 22–25, 25–22, 11–25, 13–15)	210	11–9 (3–5)
3/24; 6 p.m.	@ Purdue Fort Wayne*	#12	Hilliard Gates Sports Center; Ft. Wayne, IN	ESPN+	W 3–0 (25–23, 25–19, 25–21)	419	12–9 (4–5)
3/26; 7 p.m.	#11 Loyola Chicago*	#12	Neil Carey Arena; Romeoville, IL	GLVC SN	L 0–3 (18–25, 17–25, 24–26)	673	12–10 (4–6)
3/31; 6 p.m.	@ Ohio State*	#13	Covelli Center; Columbus, OH	B1G+	W 3–1 (26–24, 17–25, 25–23, 25–18)	647	13–10 (5–6)
4/2; 6 p.m.	@ #8 Ball State*	#13	Worthen Arena; Muncie, IN	Ball State All-Access	L 0–3 (19–25, 24–26, 20–25)	880	13–11 (5–7)
4/7; 7 p.m.	Quincy*	#13	Neil Carey Arena; Romeoville, IL	GLVC SN	W 3–1 (25–16, 25–20, 20–25, 25–16)	229	14–11 (6–7)
4/9; 5 p.m.	Lindenwood*	#13	Neil Carey Arena; Romeoville, IL	GLVC SN	W 3–1 (25–23, 20–25, 29–27, 25–21)	348	15–11 (7–7)
4/16; 6 p.m.	Ohio State^{(5)}	#13^{(4)}	Neil Carey Arena; Romeoville, IL (2022 MIVA Quarterfinals)	GLVC SN	W 3–2 (19–25, 27–29, 25–23, 25–19, 15–10)	317	16–11
4/20; 6 p.m.	#7 Ball State^{(1)}	#12^{(4)}	Worthen Arena; Muncie, IN (2022 MIVA Semifinals)	ESPN+	L 0–3 (23–25, 17–25, 15–25)	913	16–12

*-Indicates conference match.
Times listed are Central Time Zone.

== Announcers for televised games ==
- Maryville: Patrick Hennessey & Tyler Avenatti
- NJIT: Patrick Hennessey & Tyler Avenatti
- St. Francis: Cody Lindeman, & Tyler Avenatti
- Long Beach State: Patrick Hennessey
- Belmont Abbey: Cody Lindeman & Logan Kap
- Pepperdine: Al Epstein
- UCLA: Denny Cline
- Grand Canyon: Cody Lindeman, Bella Ray, & Andrea Zeiser
- Ball State: Cody Lindeman, Juliana Van Loo, & Ally Hickey
- Ohio State: Patrick Hennessey, Juliana Van Loo, & Ally Hickey
- Lindenwood: Michael Wagenknecht & Sara Wagenknecht
- Quincy: No commentary
- Purdue Fort Wayne: Cody Lindeman, Farah Taki, & Megan Schlechte
- Loyola Chicago: Scott Sudikoff & Lauren Withrow
- Benedictine: Patrick Hennessey
- Emmanuel: Patrick Hennessey
- Hawai'i: Kanoa Leahey & Ryan Tsuji
- Hawai'i: Kanoa Leahey & Ryan Tsuji
- McKendree: Tyler Avenatti, Keegan Carey, & Natalie Stefanski
- McKendree: Colin Suhre
- Purdue Fort Wayne: Mike Maahs
- Loyola Chicago: Patrick Hennessey & Tyler Avenatti
- Ohio State: Brendan Gulick & Zachary Rodier
- Ball State: No commentary
- Quincy: Cody Lindeman, Hannah Alvey, & Mikah Freppon
- Lindenwood: No commentary
- Ohio State: No commentary
- Ball State: Joel Godett, Kevin Owens, & Madison Surface
