= Donan Cruz =

American volleyball coach

Current position
- Title: Associate head coach
- Team: BYU
- Conference: Big 12

Playing career
- 2004–2006: Graceland
- Positions: Outside hitter, defensive specialist

Coaching career (HC unless noted)

Men's volleyball
- 2012–2022: Grand View
- 2022–2025: Ball State
- 2026: Hawaii (assistant)

Women's volleyball
- 2009–2016: Grand View
- 2026–present: BYU (associate HC)

Head coaching record
- Overall: 292–91 (.762) (men's)
- Tournaments: 0–1 (NCAA)

Accomplishments and honors

Championships
- 1× Midwestern Intercollegiate Volleyball Association Tournament (2022); 1× NAIA National Invitational Championship (2018); 1× NAIA National Championship (2021)

Awards
- 1× AVCA National Coach of the Year (NCAA Div. I-II 2022); 2× AVCA National Coach of the Year (NAIA 2017, 2021); 2× MIVA Coach of the Year (NCAA Div. I-II 2022, 2024)

Donan Cruz is an American men's college volleyball coach, who is currently the associate head coach for the BYU Cougars women's volleyball program. He previously served as the head coach of the Ball State Cardinals men's volleyball team. He previously held the same position at Grand View University in Des Moines, Iowa.

== Coaching career ==
In his first year as head coach at Ball State, the Cardinals compiled a 23–4 record and were the second seed at the 2022 NCAA Men's National Collegiate Volleyball Tournament. To conclude the 2022 season, the Cardinals fell in five sets in the semi-finals of the 2022 NCAA Men's National Collegiate Volleyball Tournament to the eventual national champions, the Hawaii Rainbow Warriors. On June 28, 2025, Cruz resigned as head coach of Ball State.

=== Year by Year Record ===
Record table
Season	Team	Overall	Conference	Standing	Postseason
Grand View (Heart of America Athletic Conference) (2012–2021)
2012	Grand View	13-13	3-7		
2013	Grand View	15-10	5-5		
2014	Grand View	28-3	8-0		NAIA National Invitational Semi-Finals
2015	Grand View	20-9	8-2		NAIA National Invitational Semi-Finals
2016	Grand View	20-8	7-1		NAIA National Invitational Semi-Finals
2017	Grand View	25-4	10-0		NAIA National Invitational Finals (L)
2018	Grand View	23-5	10-0		NAIA National Invitational Finals (W)
2019	Grand View	20-2	9-1		NAIA National Championship Semi-Finals
2020	Grand View	22-1	10-0		Postseason Cancelled due to COVID-19
2021	Grand View	26-0	19-0		NAIA National Championship Finals (W)
Grand View:		211–55 (.793)	89–16 (.848)		
Ball State (Midwestern Intercollegiate Volleyball Association) (2022–present)
2022	Ball State	23-4	12-2	1st	NCAA Semi-Finals
2023	Ball State	20-9	11-3	T-1st	
2024	Ball State	21-10	11-3	1st	
2025	Ball State	17-13	9-7		
Ball State:		81–36 (.692)	43–15 (.741)		
Total:		292–91 (.762)			
National champion Postseason invitational champion Conference regular season champion Conference regular season and conference tournament champion Division regular season champion Division regular season and conference tournament champion Conference tournament champion
