= 2022 LIU Sharks men's volleyball team =

American college volleyball season

2022 LIU Sharks men's volleyball
- Conference: Independent Volleyball Association
- Record: 13-15 (0-0 IVA)
- Head coach: Shawn Patchell (1st season)
- Assistant coach: Kai Dugquem (1st season)
- Home arena: Steinberg Wellness Center

The 2022 LIU Sharks men's volleyball team, the first ever LIU men's volleyball team, represented Long Island University Brooklyn in the 2022 NCAA Division I & II men's volleyball season. The Sharks, led by first year head coach Shawn Patchell, played their home games at Steinberg Wellness Center. The Sharks competed as an Independent. However the Sharks will join the newly created Northeast Conference men's volleyball conference in 2023. After a slow start LIU won 9 of their final 10 games to finish a respectable 13–15.

2022 NCAA Division I & II Independent Volleyball Association standings
	Conf.				Overall
Team	W		L	PCT	W		L	PCT
Daemen ‍‍‍	0	–	0	–	14	–	5	.737
Lincoln Memorial ‍‍‡‍	0	–	0	–	17	–	7	.708
Limestone ‍‍‍	0	–	0	–	17	–	9	.654
Maryville ‍‍‍	0	–	0	–	19	–	11	.633
Queens ‍‍‍	0	–	0	–	16	–	11	.593
D'Youville ‍‍‍	0	–	0	–	8	–	11	.421
LIU ‍‍‍	0	–	0	–	13	–	15	.464
Fairleigh Dickinson ‍‍‍	0	–	0	–	6	–	14	.300
Tusculum ‍‍‍	0	–	0	–	6	–	19	.240
Alderson Broaddus ‍‍‍	0	–	0	–	6	–	20	.231
American International ‍‍‍	0	–	0	–	2	–	16	.111
‡ – 2022 IVA Tournament champion As of March 17, 2025; Rankings from AVCA

== Season highlights ==
- Will be filled in as the season progresses.

== Roster ==
2022 LIU Sharks roster
Defensive Specialist/Libero: 7 Danny Seliger - Freshman; Middle blockers: 2 Gioele Iacono - Freshman; 12 Chris Rimaldi - Freshman; 13 Hasan Hadžic - Sophomore; 14 Sage Gatling - Freshman; 19 Eddy Alexandre - Sophomore	Outside hitters: 4 Giomar Collaza - Freshman; 6 Mark Stapley - Graduate; 9 Kade Frischknecht - Sophomore; 11 Livan Moreno - Junior; 12 Chris Rimaldi - Freshman; 16 Jordan Cooper - Junior; 18 Gun Kritsaphagun - Sophomore; 22 Caden Satterfield - Junior	Opposite hitters: 1 Luke Chandler - Freshman; 13 Hasan Hadžic - Sophomore; Setters: 5 Luca Holanda - Freshman; 8 Kasey Clouet - Freshman

== Schedule ==
TV/Internet Streaming information:

All home games were streamed on NEC Front Row. Most road games were streamed by the schools streaming service.

Date Time	Opponent	Rank	Arena City (Tournament)	Television	Score	Attendance	Record
1/10; 7 p.m.	@ Belmont Abbey		Wheeler Center; Belmont, NC	Coastal Carolina DN	L 0–3 (17–25, 16–25, 15–25)	112	0–1
1/11; 7 p.m.	@ Belmont Abbey		Wheeler Center; Belmont, NC	Coastal Carolina DN	L 0–3 (20–25, 20–25, 27–29)	104	0–2
1/14; 5 p.m.	Springfield		Steinberg Wellness Center; Brooklyn, NY	NEC Front Row	L 0–3 (22–25, 14–25, 20–25)	99	0–3
1/18; 7 p.m.	St. Francis Brooklyn		Steinberg Wellness Center; Brooklyn, NY	NEC Front Row	Cancelled- COVID-19		
1/22; 4 p.m.	@ St. Francis		DeGol Arena; Loretto, PA	NEC Front Row	L 0–3 (19–25, 21–25, 22–25)	120	0–4
1/25; 7 p.m.	@ Fairleigh Dickinson		Rothman Center; Hackensack, NJ	NEC Front Row	W 3–1 (25–16, 25–20, 18–25, 28–26)	153	1–4
1/29; 12:30 p.m.	@ Daemen		Charles L. & Gloria B. Lumsden Gymnasium; Amherst, NY (Battle 4 New York)	ECC SN	L 0–3 (18–25, 18–25, 26–28)	115	1–5
1/29; 4:30 p.m.	@ D'Youville		College Center Gymnasium; Buffalo, NY (Battle 4 New York)	ECC SN	W 3–1 (25–21, 25–27, 25–18, 25–22)	85	2–5
2/3; 7 p.m.	@ Alvernia		Physical Education Center; Reading, PA	Alvernia All-Access	W 3–1 (25–23, 20–25, 25–23, 25–20)	73	3–5
2/4; 6 p.m.	@ NJIT		Wellness and Events Center; Newark, NJ	America East TV	L 0–3 (19–25, 16–25, 18–25)	122	3–6
2/5; 7 p.m.	vs. NJIT		Rothman Center; Hackensack, NJ	NEC Front Row	L 0–3 (17–25, 22–25, 22–25)	57	3–7
2/8; 11:59 p.m.	@ #3 Hawai'i		Stan Sheriff Center; Honolulu, HI	SPEC HI; ESPN+	L 0–3 (24–26, 13–25, 17–25)	2,892	3–8
2/9; 11:59 p.m.	@ #3 Hawai'i		Stan Sheriff Center; Honolulu, HI	SPEC HI; ESPN+	L 0–3 (9–25, 13–25, 17–25)	3,280	3–9
2/11; 11:59 p.m.	@ #3 Hawai'i		Stan Sheriff Center; Honolulu, HI	SPEC HI; ESPN+	L 1–3 (18–25, 25–22, 15–25, 9–25)	3,159	3–10
2/18; 7 p.m.	D'Youville		Steinberg Wellness Center; Brooklyn, NY	NEC Front Row	W 3–0 (25–22, 25–14, 25–16)	90	4–10
2/22; 7 p.m.	@ St. Francis Brooklyn		Generoso Pope Athletic Complex; Brooklyn, NY	NEC Front Row	L 2–3 (22–25, 25–22, 25–21, 20–25, 12–15)	65	4–11
2/27; 2 p.m.	St. Francis		Steinberg Wellness Center; Brooklyn, NY	NEC Front Row	L 0–3 (16–25, 21–25, 23–25)	35	4–12
3/04; 10 p.m.	@ #5 UC Santa Barbara		Robertson Gymnasium; Santa Barbara, CA	UCSB SN on Stretch	L 0–3 (13–25, 22–25, 13–25)	1,000	4–13
3/05; 10:30 p.m.	@ #2 Long Beach State		Walter Pyramid; Long Beach, CA	ESPN+	L 0–3 (18–25, 14–25, 15–25)	1,139	4–14
3/06; 5 p.m.	@ St. Katherine		USK Sports Complex; San Marcos, CA	USK Stretch	W 3–1 (25–20, 25–18, 20–25, 25–20)	0	5–14
3/09; 7 p.m.	Edward Waters		Steinberg Wellness Center; Brooklyn, NY	NEC Front Row	W 3–0 (25–17, 32–30, 25–21)	38	6–14
3/11; 7 p.m.	@ Sacred Heart		William H. Pitt Center; Fairfield, CT	NEC Front Row	W 3–2 (25–23, 25–20, 22–25, 15–25, 15–11)	75	7–14
3/18; 2:30 p.m.	vs. Limestone		Rex Pyles Arena; Philippi, WV		Cancelled- COVID-19		
3/18; 6 p.m.	@ Alderson Broaddus		Rex Pyles Arena; Philippi, WV	Mountain East TV	Cancelled- COVID-19		
3/19; 11 a.m.	@ Alderson Broaddus		Rex Pyles Arena; Philippi, WV	Mountain East TV	Cancelled- COVID-19		
3/25; 7 p.m.	American International		Steinberg Wellness Center; Brooklyn, NY	NEC Front Row	W 3–0 (25–12, 25–12, 25–18)	71	8–14
3/27; 7 p.m.	@ Edward Waters		Adams-Jenkins Complex; Jacksonville, FL	YouTube	W 3–0 (25–22, 25–23, 26–24)	47	9–14
3/28; 7 p.m.	@ Edward Waters		Adam-Jenkins Complex; Jacksonville, FL	YouTube	W 3–1 (25–18, 25–18, 20–25, 35–33)	23	10–14
4/03; 6:30 p.m.	@ American International		Henry A. Butova Gymnasium; Springfield, MA	AIC Stretch	W 3–0 (25–14, 25–11, 25–16)	76	11–14
4/05; 7 p.m.	St. Francis Brooklyn		Steinberg Wellness Center; Brooklyn, NY	NEC Front Row	W 3–2 (23–25, 25–23, 26–24, 22–25, 15–10)	46	12—14
4/08; 7 p.m.	Sacred Heart		Steinberg Wellness Center; Brooklyn, NY	NEC Front Row	L 1–3 (17–25, 25–21, 22–25, 23–25)	58	12—15
4/09; 7 p.m.	Fairleigh Dickinson		Steinberg Wellness Center; Brooklyn, NY	NEC Front Row	W 3–2 (25–23, 25–17, 22–25, 22–25, 15–13)	44	13–15

*-Indicates conference match.
Times listed are Eastern Time Zone.

== Announcers for televised games ==
- Belmont Abbey: Geffrey Chiles
- Belmont Abbey: Geffrey Chiles
- Springfield: No commentary
- St. Francis: Jake Slebodnick & Sophie Rice
- Fairleigh Dickinson: Marc Ernay
- Daemen: Joe Kraus
- D'Youville: Jamal
- Alvernia: No commentary
- NJIT: Ira Thor
- NJIT: No commentary
- Hawai'i: Kanoa Leahey & Ryan Tsuji
- Hawai'i: Kanoa Leahey & Ryan Tsuji
- Hawai'i: Kanoa Leahey & Ryan Tsuji
- D'Youville: No commentary
- St. Francis Brooklyn: Marc Ernay
- St. Francis: No commentary
- UC Santa Barbara: Greg Silver & Katie Spieler
- Long Beach State: Bryan Fenley & Mike Sealy
- St. Katherine: No commentary
- Edward Waters: No commentary
- Sacred Heart: Nyala Pendergrass
- American International: No commentary
- Edward Waters: No commentary
- Edward Waters: No commentary
- American International: No commentary
- St. Francis Brooklyn: No commentary
- Sacred Heart: No commentary
- Fairleigh Dickinson: No commentary
