= 2022 Hawaii Rainbow Warriors volleyball team =

American college volleyball season

2022 Hawaii Rainbow Warriors volleyball

Big West Tournament Champions

NCAA Champions
- Conference: Big West Conference
- Record: 27–5 (7–3 Big West)
- Head coach: Charlie Wade (13th season)
- Assistant coaches: Milan Zarkovic (9th season); Josh Walker (7th season)
- Home stadium: Stan Sheriff Center

The 2022 Hawaii Rainbow Warriors volleyball team represented the University of Hawaiʻi at Mānoa (UH) in the 2022 NCAA Division I & II men's volleyball season. The Rainbow Warriors, led by 13th-year head coach Charlie Wade, played home games at Stan Sheriff Center on the UH campus in the Honolulu neighborhood of Mānoa. The Rainbow Warriors, members of the Big West Conference, were picked by Big West coaches to share the conference in its preseason poll with Long Beach State. The Rainbow Warriors entered the season the defending national champions after defeating BYU in the 2021 national championship. The national championship was Hawai'i's first men's volleyball national championship after they had to vacate the 2002 national championship.

2022 Big West Conference men's volleyball standings
	Conf.				Overall
Team	W		L	PCT	W		L	PCT
No. 2 Long Beach State ‍†‍‍^{y}	8	–	2	.800	21	–	6	.778
No. 1 Hawaii ‍‍‡‍^{y}	7	–	3	.700	27	–	5	.844
No. 8 UC Santa Barbara ‍‍‍	6	–	4	.600	19	–	9	.679
No. 10 UC San Diego ‍‍‍	5	–	5	.500	13	–	11	.542
No. 13 UC Irvine ‍‍‍	3	–	7	.300	10	–	15	.400
Cal State Northridge ‍‍‍	1	–	9	.100	6	–	15	.286
† – Conference champion ‡ – Big West tournament champion y – Invited to the NCAA tournament Rankings from AVCA

== Roster ==
2022 Hawaii Rainbow Warriors roster
Defensive Specialist/Libero: 3 Logan Sharp - (redshirt) Freshman; 4 Brett Sheward - Sophomore; 5 'Eleu Choy - (redshirt) Freshman; 15 Avery Enriques - Senior; 22 Reyn Miyazawa - Freshman; Middle blockers: 7 Cole Hogland - Sophomore; 8 Kyler Presho - Senior; 9 Kurt Nusterer - Freshman; 13 Max Rosenfeld - Junior; 14 Alka'i Todd - Sophomore; 21 Guilherme Voss - Sophomore	Outside hitters: 1 Chaz Galloway - Sophomore; 6 Makua Marumoto - (redshirt) Freshman; 16 Filip Humler - Junior; 17 Trevalyan Kelly - Freshman; 18 Cole Ottmar - Freshman; 20 Keoni Thiim - Sophomore; 23 Spyros Chakas - Sophomore; 25 Kana'i Akana - Junior	Opposite hitters: 7 Cole Hogland - Sophomore; 11 Dimitrios Mouchlias - Sophomore; 14 Alka'i Todd - Sophomore; 16 Filip Humler - Junior; 17 Trevalyan Kelly - Freshman; 23 Spyros Chakas - Sophomore; Setters: 2 Jack Walmer - (redshirt) Freshman; 4 Brett Sheward - Sophomore; 10 Jakob Thelle - Junior; 12 Austin Buchanan - (redshirt) Freshman

== Schedule ==
TV/Internet Streaming information:

All home games will be televised on Spectrum Sports. All conference road games will be streamed on ESPN+ or the respective schools streaming service.

Date Time	Opponent	Rank^{(Tournament Seed)}	Arena City (Tournament)	Television	Score	Attendance	Record (Big West Record)
1/05; 7 p.m.	#7 Loyola Chicago	#1	Stan Sheriff Center; Honolulu, HI (Outrigger Challenge)	SPEC	W 3–0 (25–14, 25–23, 25–18)	3,449	1–0
1/07; 7 p.m.	#7 Loyola Chicago	#1	Stan Sheriff Center; Honolulu, HI (Outrigger Challenge)	SPEC	W 3–1 (25–19, 25–16, 18–25, 25–14)	3,355	2–0
1/14; 7 p.m.	Edward Waters	#1	Stan Sheriff Center; Honolulu, HI	SPEC	W 3–0 (25–11, 25–7, 25–10)	3,199	3–0
1/16; 5 p.m.	Edward Waters	#1	Stan Sheriff Center; Honolulu, HI	SPEC	W 3–0 (25–10, 25–7, 25–12)	3,020	4–0
1/29; 2 p.m.	@ #15 Ball State	#1	Worthen Arena; Muncie, IN	ESPN+	L 0–3 (20–25, 18–25, 19–25)	2,003	4–1
1/31; 2 p.m.	@ #10 Ball State	#1	Worthen Arena; Muncie, IN	ESPN+	L 2–3 (18–25, 25–22, 25–27, 25–22, 11–15)	1,541	4–2
2/04; 7:30 a.m.	vs. Fairleigh Dickinson	#1	Austin Convention Center; Austin, TX (First Point Men's Volleyball Collegiate Challenge)	SPEC	W 3–0 (25–10, 25–14, 25–15)	363	5–2
2/04; 3 p.m.	vs. Queens	#1	Austin Convention Center; Austin, TX (First Point Men's Volleyball Collegiate Challenge)	SPEC	W 3–0 (25–10, 25–11, 25–8)	297	6–2
2/05; 2 p.m.	vs. #14 Stanford	#1	Austin Convention Center; Austin, TX (First Point Men's Volleyball Collegiate Challenge)	SPEC	W 3–1 (19–25, 25–13, 25–19, 25–20)	1,875	7–2
2/08; 7 p.m.	LIU	#3	Stan Sheriff Center; Honolulu, HI	SPEC	W 3–0 (26–24, 25–11, 25–15)	2,892	8–2
2/09; 7 p.m.	LIU	#3	Stan Sheriff Center; Honolulu, HI	SPEC	W 3–0 (25–9, 25–13, 25–17)	3,280	9–2
2/11; 7 p.m.	LIU	#3	Stan Sheriff Center; Honolulu, HI	SPEC	W 3–1 (25–18, 22–25, 25–15, 25–9)	3,159	10–2
2/18; 7 p.m.	#15 Lincoln Memorial	#3	Stan Sheriff Center; Honolulu, HI		W 3–0 (25–21, 25–21, 25–21)	3,415	11–2
2/19; 7 p.m.	#15 Lincoln Memorial	#3	Stan Sheriff Center; Honolulu, HI	SPEC	W 3–0 (25–11, 25–16, 25–17)	3,284	12–2
2/20; 5 p.m.	#15 Lincoln Memorial	#3	Stan Sheriff Center; Honolulu, HI	SPEC	W 3–1 (25–14, 22–25, 25–13, 25–23)	3,288	13–2
3/02; 5 p.m.	@ #10 UC San Diego*	#3	RIMAC; La Jolla, CA	ESPN+	L 2–3 (22–25, 23–25, 27–25, 25–18, 9–15)	751	13–3 (0–1)
3/04; 5 p.m.	@ #10 UC San Diego*	#3	RIMAC; La Jolla, CA	ESPN+	W 3–0 (25–22, 25–20, 25–19)	957	14–3 (1–1)
3/10; 7 p.m.	#12 Lewis	#4	Stan Sheriff Center; Honolulu, HI	SPEC	W 3–0 (25–15, 25–21, 25–19)	3,869	15–3
3/12; 7 p.m.	#12 Lewis	#4	Stan Sheriff Center; Honolulu, HI	SPEC	W 3–1 (25–18, 27–29, 25–19, 26–24)	4,362	16–3
3/25; 7 p.m.	CSUN*	#4	Stan Sheriff Center; Honolulu, HI	SPEC	W 3–1 (25–20, 25–20, 23–25, 25–19)	4,407	17–3 (2–1)
3/26; 7 p.m.	CSUN*	#4	Stan Sheriff Center; Honolulu, HI	SPEC	W 3–0 (25–11, 25–17, 26–24)	4,344	18–3 (3–1)
4/01; 4 p.m.	@ #2 Long Beach State*	#4	Walter Pyramid; Long Beach, CA	ESPN+	L 1–3 (25–22, 23–25, 24–26, 25–27)	2,607	18–4 (3–2)
4/02; 4:30 p.m.	@ #2 Long Beach State*	#4	Walter Pyramid; Long Beach, CA	ESPNU	L 1–3 (23–25, 20–25, 25–21, 19–25)	3,014	18–5 (3–3)
4/08; 7 p.m.	#5 UC Santa Barbara*	#4	Stan Sheriff Center; Honolulu, HI	SPEC	W 3–0 (25–16, 25–23, 28–26)	4,960	19–5 (4–3)
4/09; 7 p.m.	#5 UC Santa Barbara*	#4	Stan Sheriff Center; Honolulu, HI	SPEC	W 3–2 (19–25, 25–20, 24–26, 25–18, 15–10)	6,744	20–5 (5–3)
4/15; 4 p.m.	@ #14 UC Irvine*	#4	Bren Events Center; Irvine, CA	ESPN+	W 3–0 (25–21, 25–18, 25–22)	952	21–5 (6–3)
4/16; 4 p.m.	@ #14 UC Irvine*	#4	Bren Events Center; Irvine, CA	ESPN+	W 3–2 (21–25, 25–18, 25–27, 25–20, 15–11)	1,031	22–5 (7–3)
4/22; 7 p.m.	#6 UC Santa Barbara^{(3)}	#4^{(2)}	Stan Sheriff Center; Honolulu, HI (Big West Semifinal)	SPEC	W 3–0 (25–18, 26–24, 25–14)	5,238	23–5
4/23; 7:30 p.m.	#3 Long Beach State^{(1)}	#4^{(2)}	Stan Sheriff Center; Honolulu, HI (Big West Championship)	SPEC	W 3–0 (27–25, 28–26, 25–23)	6,636	24–5
5/3; 4:30 p.m.	North Greenville	#1	Pauley Pavilion; Los Angeles, CA (NCAA Opening Round)	SPEC	W 3–0 (25–15, 25–17, 25–16)	1,814	25-5
5/5; 4:30 p.m.	#4 Ball State^{(2)}	#1	Pauley Pavilion; Los Angeles, CA (NCAA Semifinals)	NCAA.com	W 3–2 (28-26, 19-25, 20-25, 25-20, 15-11)	4,430	26-5
5/7; 2 p.m.	#2 Long Beach State^{(1)}	#1	Pauley Pavilion; Los Angeles, CA (NCAA Championship)	ESPN2	W 3–0 (25-22, 25-21, 25-20)	5,784	27-5

*-Indicates conference match.
Times listed are Hawaii Time Zone.

== Announcers for televised games ==
- Loyola-Chicago: Kanoa Leahey & Ryan Tsuji
- Loyola-Chicago: Kanoa Leahey & James Anastassiades
- Edward Waters: Kanoa Leahey & Ryan Tsuji
- Edward Waters: Kanoa Leahey & Ryan Tsuji
- Ball State: Joel Godett & Amber Seaman
- Ball State: Joel Godett & Kevin Owens
- Fairleigh Dickinson: Kanoa Leahey & Bill Walton
- Queens: Kanoa Leahey & Bill Walton
- Stanford: Kanoa Leahey & Bill Walton
- LIU: Kanoa Leahey & Ryan Tsuji
- LIU: Kanoa Leahey & Ryan Tsuji
- LIU: Kanoa Leahey & Ryan Tsuji
- Lincoln Memorial: Kanoa Leahey & Ryan Tsuji
- Lincoln Memorial: Kanoa Leahey & Ryan Tsuji
- UC San Diego: Bryan Fenley & Ricci Luyties
- UC San Diego: Bryan Fenley & Ricci Luyties
- Lewis: Kanoa Leahey & Ryan Tsuji
- Lewis: Kanoa Leahey & Ryan Tsuji
- CSUN: Kanoa Leahey & Chris McLachlin
- CSUN: Kanoa Leahey & Chris McLachlin
- Long Beach State: Matt Brown & Matt Prosser
- Long Beach State: Bryan Fenley & Mike Sealy
- UC Santa Barbara: Kanoa Leahey & Chris McLachlin
- UC Santa Barbara: Kanoa Leahey & Chris McLachlin
- UC Irvine: Rob Espero & Charlie Brande
- UC Irvine: Rob Espero & Charlie Brande
- Big West Tournament- UC Irvine: Kanoa Leahey & Chris McLachlin
- Big West Championship- Long Beach State: Kanoa Leahey & Chris McLachlin

== Rankings ==
Ranking movements Legend: ██ Increase in ranking ██ Decrease in ranking
	Week																	
Poll	Pre	1	2	3	4	5	6	7	8	9	10	11	12	13	14	15	16	Final
AVCA Coaches	1	1	1	1	1	3	3	3	3	4	4	4	4	4	4	4	1	1
Off the Block Media	Not released	1	1	1	1	3	2	3	3	6	4	4	4	5	4	4	4	

^The Media did not release a Pre-season poll.
