= 2022 Big West Conference men's volleyball tournament =

Sports tournament in Hawaii

2022 Big West Conference Men's Volleyball Tournament
- Classification: Division I/II
- Teams: 6
- Site: SimpliFi Arena at Stan Sheriff Center; Honolulu, Hawaii
- Champions: Hawai'i (2nd title)
- Winning coach: Charlie Wade (2nd title)
- MVP: Jakob Thelle (Hawai'i)
- Attendance: 6,636
- Television: Spectrum OC16
- Big West Conference Men's Volleyball Tournaments

2022 Big West Conference men's volleyball standings
	Conf.				Overall
Team	W		L	PCT	W		L	PCT
No. 2 Long Beach State ‍†‍‍^{y}	8	–	2	.800	21	–	6	.778
No. 1 Hawaii ‍‍‡‍^{y}	7	–	3	.700	27	–	5	.844
No. 8 UC Santa Barbara ‍‍‍	6	–	4	.600	19	–	9	.679
No. 10 UC San Diego ‍‍‍	5	–	5	.500	13	–	11	.542
No. 13 UC Irvine ‍‍‍	3	–	7	.300	10	–	15	.400
Cal State Northridge ‍‍‍	1	–	9	.100	6	–	15	.286
† – Conference champion ‡ – Big West tournament champion y – Invited to the NCAA tournament Rankings from AVCA

The 2022 Big West Conference men's volleyball tournament is a postseason men's volleyball tournament for the Big West Conference during the 2022 NCAA Division I & II men's volleyball season. It was held April 21 through April 23, 2022 at the SimpliFi Arena at Stan Sheriff Center in Honolulu, Hawaii. The winner received the conference's automatic bid to the 2022 NCAA Volleyball Tournament.

== Seeds ==
All six teams were eligible for the postseason, with the top two seeds receiving byes to the semifinals. Teams were seeded by record within the conference, with a tiebreaker system to seed teams with identical conference records.

Seed	School	Conference	Tiebreaker
1	Long Beach State	8–2	–
2	Hawai'i	7–3	–
3	UC Santa Barbara	6–4	–
4	UC San Diego	5–5	–
5	UC Irvine	3–7	–
6	CSUN	1–9	–

== Schedule and results ==
All matches will be televised on Spectrum OC16 in Hawaii and simulcast on ESPN+ stateside.

Time Network	Matchup	Score	Attendance	Broadcasters	Report
Quarterfinals – Thursday, April 21
4:30 p.m. Spectrum OC16	No. 4 UC San Diego vs. No. 5 UC Irvine	0–3 (23–25, 20–25, 28–30)	3,521	Kanoa Leahey & Chris McLachlin	Recap
7:00 p.m. Spectrum OC16	No. 3 UC Santa Barbara vs. No. 6 CSUN	3–0 (25–19, 26–24, 26–24)	3,521	Kanoa Leahey & Chris McLachlin	Recap
Semifinals – Friday, April 22
4:30 p.m. Spectrum OC16	No. 1 Long Beach State vs. No. 5 UC Irvine	3–1 (22–25, 25–23, 25–19, 29–27)	5,238	Kanoa Leahey & Chris McLachlin	Recap
7 p.m. Spectrum OC16	No. 2 Hawai'i vs. No. 3 UC Santa Barbara	3–0 (25–18, 26–24, 25–14)	5,238	Kanoa Leahey & Chris McLachlin	Recap
Championship – Saturday, April 23
7:30 p.m. Spectrum OC16	No. 1 Long Beach State vs. No. 2 Hawai'i	0–3 (25–27, 26–28, 23–25)	6,636	Kanoa Leahey & Chris McLachlin	Recap
Game times are Hawaiian Time. Rankings denote tournament seeding.

== Bracket ==
Quarterfinals; Thursday, April 21
4	UC San Diego	0
5	UC Irvine	3
3	UC Santa Barbara	3
6	CSUN	0

Semifinals; Friday, April 22
1	Long Beach State	3
5	UC Irvine	1
2	Hawai'i	3
3	UC Santa Barbara	0

Championship; Saturday, April 23
1	Long Beach State	0
2	Hawai'i	3
