= 2022 Loyola Ramblers men's volleyball team =

American college volleyball season

2022 Loyola Ramblers men's volleyball
- Conference: Midwestern Intercollegiate Volleyball Association
- Record: 18–9 (11–3 MIVA)
- Head coach: Mark Hulse (7th season)
- Assistant coaches: Matt McCarthy (3rd season); Galen Dodd (1st season)
- Home arena: Joseph J. Gentile Arena

2022 Midwestern Intercollegiate Volleyball Association standings
| | Conf. | | | | Overall |
| Team | W | | L | PCT | W | | L | PCT |
|---|---|---|---|---|---|---|---|---|
| No. 3 Ball State ‍†‍‡‍^{y} | 12 | – | 2 | .857 | 23 | – | 4 | .852 |
| No. 12 Loyola Chicago ‍‍‍ | 11 | – | 3 | .786 | 18 | – | 9 | .667 |
| McKendree ‍‍‍ | 9 | – | 5 | .643 | 14 | – | 11 | .560 |
| No. 14 Lewis ‍‍‍ | 7 | – | 7 | .500 | 16 | – | 12 | .571 |
| Ohio State ‍‍‍ | 7 | – | 7 | .500 | 13 | – | 14 | .481 |
| No. 15 Purdue Fort Wayne ‍‍‍ | 6 | – | 8 | .429 | 17 | – | 13 | .567 |
| Lindenwood ‍‍‍ | 4 | – | 10 | .286 | 8 | – | 14 | .364 |
| Quincy ‍‍‍ | 0 | – | 14 | .000 | 4 | – | 19 | .174 |
† – Conference champion ‡ – MIVA tournament champion y – Invited to the NCAA tournament Rankings from AVCA

The 2022 Loyola Ramblers men's volleyball team represented Loyola University Chicago in the 2022 NCAA Division I & II men's volleyball season. The Ramblers, led by 7th year head coach Mark Hulse, played their home games at Joseph J. Gentile Arena. The Cardinals were members of the Midwestern Intercollegiate Volleyball Association and were picked to win the conference title in the MIVA in the preseason poll.

== Roster ==
2022 Loyola Ramblers Roster
| Defensive Specialist/Libero: 12 Matt Oakley – Sophomore; Middle Blockers: 2 Justin Ross – (redshirt) Freshman; 3 Ben Montplaisir – Sophomore; 17 Nicodemus Meyer – Freshman; 18 Jimmy Meinhart – Sophomore; 21 Jack Martel – Sophomore; 22 Jaxon Schroeder – Freshman | Outside Hitters: 1 Cole Schlothauer – (redshirt) Junior; 6 Andrew Lyons – (redshirt) Junior; 8 Jack Yentz – (redshirt) Sophomore; 10 Henry Payne – (redshirt) Senior; 14 Parker Van Buren – (redshirt) Freshman; 15 Josh Gottlieb – (redshirt) Freshman; 20 Evan Markworth – Freshman; 24 Sebastian Lara – Sophomore; 28 Colton Brooks – (redshirt) Sophomore | Opposite Hitters: 15 Josh Gottlieb – (redshirt) Freshman; 16 Jonathan Drysdale-Anderson – Sophomore; Setters: 11 Brian Voight – (redshirt) Sophomore; 13 Garrett Zolg – (redshirt) Senior; 19 Dan Mangun – (redshirt) Freshman |

== Schedule ==
| Date Time | Opponent | Rank | Arena City (Tournament) | Television | Score | Attendance | Record (MIVA Record) |
|---|---|---|---|---|---|---|---|
| 1/1; 3 p.m. | #12 UC Irvine | #7 | Joseph J. Gentile Arena; Chicago, IL | Canceled- COVID-19 | | | |
| 1/5; 11 p.m. | @ #1 Hawai'i | #7 | Stan Sheriff Center; Honolulu, HI | ESPN+ | L 0–3 (14–25, 23–25, 18–25) | 3,449 | 0–1 |
| 1/7; 11 p.m. | @ #1 Hawai'i | #7 | Stan Sheriff Center; Honolulu, HI | ESPN+ | L 1–3 (19–25, 16–25, 25–18, 14–25) | 3,355 | 0–2 |
| 1/14; 7 p.m. | St. Francis | #8 | Joseph J. Gentile Arena; Chicago, IL | ESPN+ | W 3–0 (25–20, 25–17, 25–21) | 623 | 1–2 |
| 1/15; 7 p.m. | NJIT | #8 | Joseph J. Gentile Arena; Chicago, IL | ESPN+ | W 3–1 (25–23, 22–25, 25–16, 25–21) | 398 | 2–2 |
| 1/21; 3 p.m. | Belmont Abbey | #9 | Joseph J. Gentile Arena; Chicago, IL | ESPN+ | W 3–0 (25–18, 25–22, 25–10) | 223 | 3–2 |
| 1/22; 7 p.m. | #5 Long Beach State | #9 | Joseph J. Gentile Arena; Chicago, IL | NBCS CHIC | L 0–3 (17–25, 17–25, 22–25) | 706 | 3–3 |
| 1/28; 6 p.m. | @ Lincoln Memorial | #11 | Mary Mars Gymnasium; Harrogate, TN | Lincoln Memorial SN | L 0–3 (21–25, 22–25, 15–25) | 325 | 3–4 |
| 1/29; 6 p.m. | @ King | #11 | Student Center Complex; Bristol, TN | Conference Carolinas DN | W 3–2 (25–18, 20–25, 22–25, 25–18, 15–12) | 256 | 4–4 |
| 2/4; 7 p.m. | #8 Grand Canyon | | Joseph J. Gentile Arena; Chicago, IL | ESPN+ | L 0–3 (17–25, 19–25, 24–26) | 473 | 4–5 |
| 2/5; 7 p.m. | Central State | | Joseph J. Gentile Arena; Chicago, IL | Canceled- Winter Storm Landon | | | |
| 2/10; 3 p.m. | Quincy* | | Joseph J. Gentile Arena; Chicago, IL | ESPN3 | W 3–0 (25–11, 25–20, 25–18) | 176 | 5–5 (1–0) |
| 2/12; 7 p.m. | Lindenwood* | | Joseph J. Gentile Arena; Chicago, IL | ESPN+ | W 3–1 (25–22, 22–25, 25–17, 25–23) | 319 | 6–5 (2–0) |
| 2/17; 6 p.m. | @ #14 Ohio State* | | Covelli Center; Columbus, OH | B1G+ | W 3–2 (22–25, 28–26, 23–25, 26–24, 16–14) | 514 | 7–5 (3–0) |
| 2/19; 3 p.m. | @ #7 Ball State* | | Worthen Arena; Muncie, IN | Ball State All-Access | W 3–1 (19–25, 25–23, 25–21, 25–20) | 1,462 | 8–5 (4–0) |
| 2/24; 7 p.m. | @ McKendree* | #14 | Melvin Price Convocation Center; Lebanon, IL | GLVC SN | L 2–3 (25–18, 25–23, 17–25, 18–25, 13–15) | 100 | 8–6 (4–1) |
| 2/26; 7 p.m. | #10 Lewis* | #14 | Joseph J. Gentile Arena; Chicago, IL | NBSC CHIC | W 3–0 (25–18, 25–22, 25–22) | 1,097 | 9–6 (5–1) |
| 3/4; 7 p.m. | Purdue Fort Wayne* | #12 | Joseph J. Gentile Arena; Chicago, IL | ESPN+ | W 3–0 (25–21, 25–20, 25–20) | 393 | 10–6 (6–1) |
| 3/5; 7 p.m. | Emmanuel | #12 | Joseph J. Gentile Arena; Chicago, IL | ESPN+ | W 3–0 (25–20, 25–21, 32–30) | 223 | 11–6 |
| 3/13; 7 p.m. | Daemen | #11 | Joseph J. Gentile Arena; Chicago, IL | ESPN+ | W 3–1 (21–25, 25–15, 30–28, 25–21) | 271 | 12–6 |
| 3/19; 4 p.m. | @ Purdue Fort Wayne* | #11 | Hilliard Gates Sports Center; Fort Wayne, IN | ESPN+ | W 3–1 (26–28, 25–23, 25–20, 25–19) | 200 | 13–6 (7–1) |
| 3/24; 7 p.m. | McKendree* | #11 | Joseph J. Gentile Arena; Chicago, IL | ESPN+ | L 2–3 (26–28, 21–25, 25–13, 25–22, 10–15) | 605 | 13–7 (7–2) |
| 3/26; 7 p.m. | @ #12 Lewis* | #11 | Neil Carey Arena; Romeoville, IL | GLVC SN | W 3–0 (25–18, 25–17, 26–24) | 673 | 14–7 (8–2) |
| 3/31; 7 p.m. | @ Lindenwood* | #11 | Robert F. Hyland Arena; St. Charles, MO | GLVC SN | W 3–0 (25–16, 25–9, 25–17) | 312 | 15–7 (9–2) |
| 4/2; 3 p.m. | @ Quincy* | #11 | Pepsi Arena; Quincy, IL | GLVC SN | W 3–0 (25–19, 25–23, 25–14) | 75 | 16–7 (10–2) |
| 4/7; 7 p.m. | #7 Ball State* | #11 | Joseph J. Gentile Arena; Chicago, IL | ESPN+ | W 3–0 (25–18, 25–19, 26–24) | 911 | 17–7 (11–2) |
| 4/9; 3 p.m. | Ohio State* | #11 | Joseph J. Gentile Arena; Chicago, IL | NBCS CHIC | L 0–3 (17–25, 17–25, 21–25) | 800 | 17–8 (11–3) |
| 4/16; 5 p.m. | Lindenwood^{(7)} | #11^{(2)} | Joseph J. Gentile Arena; Chicago, IL (MIVA Quarterfinals) | ESPN+ | W 3–0 (25–20, 25–19, 25–22) | 253 | 18–8 |
| 4/20; 7 p.m. | #15 Purdue Fort Wayne^{(6)} | #11^{(2)} | Joseph J. Gentile Arena; Chicago, IL (MIVA Semifinals) | ESPN+ | L 0–3 (30–32, 23–25, 25–27) | 489 | 18–9 |

*-Indicates conference match.
Times listed are Central Time Zone.

== Broadcasters ==
- Hawai'i: Kanoa Leahey & Ryan Tsuki
- Hawai'i: Kanoa Leahey & James Anastassiades
- St. Francis: Sam Levitt & Ray Gooden
- NJIT: Scott Sudikoff & Ray Gooden
- Belmont Abbey: Tyler Aki & Lauren Withrow
- Long Beach State: Tyler Aki & Kris Berzins
- Lincoln Memorial: Adam Haley
- King: Brittney Ramsey & Julie Ward
- Grand Canyon: Ray Gooden & Kris Berzins
- Quincy: Sam Levitt & Ray Gooden
- Lindenwood: Sam Levitt & Kris Berzins
- Ohio State: Keith Kokinda & Hanna Williford
- Ball State: No commentary
- McKendree: Colin Suhre
- Lewis: Scott Sudikoff & Lauren Withrow
- Purdue Fort Wayne: Scott Sudikoff & Ray Gooden
- Emmanuel: Ray Gooden & Kris Berzins
- Daemen: Scott Sudikoff & Ray Gooden
- Purdue Fort Wayne: Mike Maahs
- McKendree: Scott Sudikoff & Ray Gooden
- Lewis: Patrick Hennessey & Tyler Avenatti
- Lindenwood: Michael Wagenknecht & Sara Wagenknecht
- Quincy: No commentary
- Ball State: Scott Sudikoff & Kris Berzins
- Ohio State: Scott Sudikoff & Kris Berzins
- MIVA Quarterfinal- Lindenwood: Ray Gooden
- MIVA Semifinal- Purdue Fort Wayne: Scott Sudikoff & Ray Gooden

== Rankings ==
Ranking movements Legend: ██ Increase in ranking ██ Decrease in ranking — = Not ranked RV = Received votes
| | Week | | | | | | | | | | | | | | | | | |
| Poll | Pre | 1 | 2 | 3 | 4 | 5 | 6 | 7 | 8 | 9 | 10 | 11 | 12 | 13 | 14 | 15 | 16 | Final |
|---|---|---|---|---|---|---|---|---|---|---|---|---|---|---|---|---|---|---|
| AVCA Coaches | 7 | 8 | 9 | 11 | RV | — | — | 14 | 12 | 11 | 11 | 11 | 11 | 11 | 11 | 11 | 11 | 12 |
| Off the Block Media | Not released | 7 | 8 | RV | — | — | RV | RV | RV | RV | RV | RV | RV | RV | RV | RV | ^ | RV |

^The Media did not release a Pre-season or Post Conference Tournament poll.

== Honors ==
To be filled in upon completion of the season.
