= 2022 Lincoln Memorial Railsplitters men's volleyball team =

American college volleyball season

2022 Lincoln Memorial Railsplitters men's volleyball

IVA Tournament Champions
- Conference: Independent Volleyball Association
- Record: 8–3 (2–0 IVA)
- Head coach: John Cash (5th season)
- Assistant coach: Jorge Collazo (1st season)
- Home arena: Mary Mars Gymnasium

2022 NCAA Division I & II Independent Volleyball Association standings
| | Conf. | | | | Overall |
| Team | W | | L | PCT | W | | L | PCT |
|---|---|---|---|---|---|---|---|---|
| Daemen ‍‍‍ | 0 | – | 0 | – | 14 | – | 5 | .737 |
| Lincoln Memorial ‍‍‡‍ | 0 | – | 0 | – | 17 | – | 7 | .708 |
| Limestone ‍‍‍ | 0 | – | 0 | – | 17 | – | 9 | .654 |
| Maryville ‍‍‍ | 0 | – | 0 | – | 19 | – | 11 | .633 |
| Queens ‍‍‍ | 0 | – | 0 | – | 16 | – | 11 | .593 |
| D'Youville ‍‍‍ | 0 | – | 0 | – | 8 | – | 11 | .421 |
| LIU ‍‍‍ | 0 | – | 0 | – | 13 | – | 15 | .464 |
| Fairleigh Dickinson ‍‍‍ | 0 | – | 0 | – | 6 | – | 14 | .300 |
| Tusculum ‍‍‍ | 0 | – | 0 | – | 6 | – | 19 | .240 |
| Alderson Broaddus ‍‍‍ | 0 | – | 0 | – | 6 | – | 20 | .231 |
| American International ‍‍‍ | 0 | – | 0 | – | 2 | – | 16 | .111 |
‡ – 2022 IVA Tournament champion Rankings from AVCA

The 2022 Lincoln Memorial Railsplitters men's volleyball team represented Lincoln Memorial University in the 2022 NCAA Division I & II men's volleyball season. The Railsplitters, led by fifth year head coach John Cash, played their home games at Mary Mars Gymnasium. The Railsplitters competed as an Independent.

== Roster ==
2022 Lincoln Memorial Railsplitters roster
| Defensive Specialist/Libero: 6 Attia Soliman - Freshman; 11 John Luers - Freshman; 16 Jacob Miller - Freshman | Outside hitters: 2 Johansen Negron - Sophomore; 4 Matthew Gentry - (redshirt) Freshman; 7 Matt Friddle - Graduate; 8 Will Eiken - Sophomore; 9 Diego Clark Keith - Freshman; 10 Jacob Titus - Sophomore; 13 Cole Campisano - Freshman; 17 Ishaan Melwani - Freshman; 19 Ethan Hubbard - Freshman; 22 Justin Sharfenaker - Freshman | Middle hitters: 1 Dawson Walker - Sophomore; 4 Matthew Gentry - (redshirt) Freshman; 8 Will Eiken - Sophomore; 12 Lucas Chazo - Sophomore; Setters: 3 Luigi Pacini - Freshman; 5 Ryan Foy - Sophomore; 7 Matt Friddle - Graduate; 14 Kohl Kutsch - Freshman |

== Schedule ==
| Date Time | Opponent | Rank | Arena City (Tournament) | Television | Score | Attendance | Record (EIVA Record) |
|---|---|---|---|---|---|---|---|
| 1/7; 7 p.m. | #8 Lewis | | Mary Mars Gymnasium; Harrogate, TN | Lincoln Memorial SN | Cancelled- COVID-19 on Lewis | | |
| 1/8; 7 p.m. | Purdue Fort Wayne | | Mary Mars Gymnasium; Harrogate, TN | Lincoln Memorial SN | W 3–0 (25–23, 25–21, 25–14) | 126 | 1–0 |
| 1/25; 7 p.m. | King | | Mary Mars Gymnasium; Harrogate, TN | Lincoln Memorial SN | W 3–2 (25–22, 23–25, 25–21, 19–25, 15–11) | 128 | 2–0 |
| 1/28; 7 p.m. | #11 Loyola Chicago | | Mary Mars Gymnasium; Harrogate, TN | Lincoln Memorial SN | W 3–0 (25–21, 25–22, 25–15) | 325 | 3–0 |
| 1/29; 7 p.m. | McKendree | | Mary Mars Gymnasium; Harrogate, TN | Lincoln Memorial SN | W 3–1 (25–22, 18–25, 25–17, 25–16) | 138 | 4–0 |
| 2/4; 7 p.m. | Erskine | | Mary Mars Gymnasium; Harrogate, TN | Lincoln Memorial SN | W 3–0 (25–11, 25–19, 25–15) | 225 | 5–0 |
| 2/5; 4 p.m. | Emmanuel | | Mary Mars Gymnasium; Harrogate, TN | Lincoln Memorial SN | W 3–0 (25–16, 25–14, 25–14) | 100 | 6–0 |
| 2/11; 7 p.m. | Queens | #15 | Mary Mars Gymnasium; Harrogate, TN | Lincoln Memorial SN | W 3–1 (23–25, 25–14, 25–18, 25–16) | 225 | 7–0 (1–0) |
| 2/12; 4 p.m. | Limestone | #15 | Mary Mars Gymnasium; Harrogate, TN | Lincoln Memorial SN | W 3–0 (25–18, 25–15, 25–22) | 185 | 8–0 (2–0) |
| 2/18; 11:59 p.m. | @ #3 Hawai'i | #15 | Stan Sheriff Center; Manoa, HI | | L 0–3 (21–25, 21–25, 21–25) | 3,415 | 8–1 |
| 2/19; 11:59 p.m. | @ #3 Hawai'i | #15 | Stan Sheriff Center; Manoa, HI | ESPN+ | L 0–3 (11–25, 16–25, 17–25) | 3,284 | 8–2 |
| 2/20; 10 p.m. | @ #3 Hawai'i | #15 | Stan Sheriff Center; Manoa, HI | ESPN+ | L 1–3 (14–25, 25–22, 13–25, 23–25) | 3,288 | 8–3 |
| 3/1; 7 p.m. | @ Tusculum | | Pioneer Arena; Greenville, TN | Pioneer SN | | | |
| 3/5; 7 p.m. | @ Ohio State | | Covelli Center; Columbus, OH | B1G+ | | | |
| 3/6; 4 p.m. | @ Ohio State | | Covelli Center; Columbus, OH | B1G+ | | | |
| 3/11; 8 p.m. | @ Lindenwood | | Robert F. Hyland Arena; St. Charles, MO (Lindenwood Invite) | GLVC SN | | | |
| 3/12; 5 p.m. | @ McKendree | | Melvin Price Convocation Center; Lebanon, IL (Lindenwood Invite) | GLVC SN | | | |
| 3/13; 3 p.m. | vs. Quincy | | Robert F. Hyland Arena; St. Charles, MO (Lindenwood Invite) | | | | |
| 3/16; 7 p.m. | Quincy | | Mary Mars Gymnasium; Harrogate, TN | Lincoln Memorial SN | | | |
| 3/22; 7 p.m. | @ Emmanuel | | Shaw Athletic Center; Franklin Springs, GA | Coastal Carolinas DN | | | |
| 3/25; 7 p.m. | @ Queens | | Curry Arena; Charlotte, NC | Queens SN | | | |
| 3/26; 7 p.m. | @ Limestone | | Timken Center; Gaffney, SC | Limestone SN | | | |
| 3/29; 7 p.m. | @ King | | Student Center Complex; Bristol, TN | Conference Carolinas DN | | | |
| 4/1; 12 p.m. | @ Alderson Broaddus | | Rex Pyles Arena; Philippi, WV | Mountain East TV | | | |
| 4/01; 2:30 p.m. | vs. Carlow | | Rex Pyles Arena; Philippi, WV | | | | |
| 4/12; 7 p.m. | Tusculum | | Mary Mars Gymnasium; Harrogate, TN | Lincoln Memorial SN | | | |

*-Indicates conference match.
Times listed are Eastern Time Zone.

== Broadcasters ==
- Purdue Fort Wayne: Adam Haley
- King: Adam Haley
- Loyola Chicago: Adam Haley
- McKendree: Adam Haley
- Erskine: Adam Haley
- Emmanuel: Adam Haley
- Queens: Adam Haley
- Limestone: Adam Haley
- Hawaii: Kanoa Leahey & Ryan Tsuji
- Hawaii: Kanoa Leahey & Ryan Tsuji
- Tusculum:
- Ohio State:
- Ohio State:
- Lindenwood:
- McKendree:
- Quincy: Adam Haley
- Emmanuel:
- Queens:
- Limestone:
- King:
- Alderson Broaddus:
- Tusculum: Adam Haley

== Rankings ==
Ranking movements Legend: ██ Increase in ranking ██ Decrease in ranking — = Not ranked RV = Received votes
| | Week | | | | | | | | | | | | | | | | | |
| Poll | Pre | 1 | 2 | 3 | 4 | 5 | 6 | 7 | 8 | 9 | 10 | 11 | 12 | 13 | 14 | 15 | 16 | Final |
|---|---|---|---|---|---|---|---|---|---|---|---|---|---|---|---|---|---|---|
| AVCA Coaches | — | — | — | — | RV | 15 | 15 | RV | RV | RV | RV | RV | RV | RV | RV | RV | | |
| Off the Block Media | Not released | — | — | — | RV | RV | RV | — | | | | | | | | | | |

^The Media did not release a Pre-season poll.

== Honors ==
- Johansen Negron won the January 31 Independent Teams Player of the Week award.
- On February 7 Lincoln Memorial became the first independent ever to be ranked in the AVCA Top 15 when they achieved the #15 ranking, the first time the Railsplitters have ever been ranked.
