= 2022 Ball State Cardinals men's volleyball team =

American college volleyball season

2022 Ball State Cardinals men's volleyball

MIVA Regular Season Champions MIVA Tournament Champions

NCAA Tournament, 3rd Place
- Conference: Midwestern Intercollegiate Volleyball Association
- Record: 23–3 (12–2 MIVA)
- Head coach: Donan Cruz (1st season)
- Assistant coaches: Mike Iandolo (1st season); Christian Rupert (1st season)
- Home arena: Worthen Arena

2022 Midwestern Intercollegiate Volleyball Association standings
	Conf.				Overall
Team	W		L	PCT	W		L	PCT
No. 3 Ball State ‍†‍‡‍^{y}	12	–	2	.857	23	–	4	.852
No. 12 Loyola Chicago ‍‍‍	11	–	3	.786	18	–	9	.667
McKendree ‍‍‍	9	–	5	.643	14	–	11	.560
No. 14 Lewis ‍‍‍	7	–	7	.500	16	–	12	.571
Ohio State ‍‍‍	7	–	7	.500	13	–	14	.481
No. 15 Purdue Fort Wayne ‍‍‍	6	–	8	.429	17	–	13	.567
Lindenwood ‍‍‍	4	–	10	.286	8	–	14	.364
Quincy ‍‍‍	0	–	14	.000	4	–	19	.174
† – Conference champion ‡ – MIVA tournament champion y – Invited to the NCAA tournament Rankings from AVCA

The 2022 Ball State Cardinals men's volleyball team represented Ball State University in the 2022 NCAA Division I & II men's volleyball season. The Cardinals, led by 1st year head coach Donan Cruz, played their home games at Worthen Arena. The Cardinals were members of the Midwestern Intercollegiate Volleyball Association and were picked to finish fourth in the MIVA in the preseason poll.

== Roster ==
2022 Ball State Cardinals roster
Defensive Specialist/Libero: 3 Xander Pink - Freshman; 4 Lukas Pytlak - Sophomore; 6 Colin Ensalaco - Graduate; 20 Sammy Adkisson - Junior; Middle blockers: 8 Vanis Buckholz - Freshman; 11 Felix Egharevba - Senior; 15 Will Hippe - Graduate; 16 Wil McPhillips - Junior; 19 Kevin Doran - Sophomore	Outside hitters: 2 Kaleb Jenness - Senior; 7 Trevor Phillips - Sophomore; 9 Bryce Behrendt - Junior; 12 Mark Wickstrom - Sophomore; 18 Brandon Shepherd - Senior; 21 Lucas Biondi - Freshman; 22 Nick Martinski - Senior	Opposite hitters: 10 Angelos Mandilaris - Graduate; 14 Dyer Ball - Sophomore; 17 Aaron Hernandez - Freshman; Setters: 1 David Flores - Junior; 5 Quinn Isaacson - Graduate; 17 Aaron Hernandez - Freshman

== Schedule ==
Date Time	Opponent	Rank	Arena City (Tournament)	Television	Score	Attendance	Record (MIVA Record)
1/13; 7 p.m.	Maryville		Worthen Arena; Muncie, IN	ESPN+	W 3–0 (25–12, 25–18, 25–13)	637	1–0
1/15; 3 p.m.	Tusculum		Worthen Arena; Muncie, IN	Ball State All-Access	W 3–0 (25–15, 25–7, 25–15)	533	2–0
1/21; 7 p.m.	George Mason		Worthen Arena; Muncie, IN	ESPN+	W 3–0 (25–11, 25–18, 25–10)	795	3–0
1/29; 7 p.m.	#1 Hawai'i	#15	Worthen Arena; Muncie, IN	ESPN+	W 3–0 (25–20, 25–18, 25–19)	2,003	4–0
1/31; 7 p.m.	#1 Hawai'i	#10	Worthen Arena; Mncie, IN	ESPN+	W 3–2 (25–18, 22–25, 27–25, 22–25, 15–11)	1,541	5–0
2/4; 9 p.m.	@ #9 BYU	#10	Smith Fieldhouse; Provo, UT	BYUtv	L 2–3 (32–30, 25–20, 20–25, 22–25, 10–15)	2,990	5–1
2/5; 9 p.m.	@ #9 BYU	#10	Smith Fieldhouse; Provo, UT	BYUtv	W 3–1 (23–25, 25–19, 33–31, 25–20)	2,702	6–1
2/04; 8 p.m.	@ #6 Lewis*	#10	Neil Carey Arena; Romeoville, IL	GLVC SN	W 3–0 (31–29, 25–22, 25–20)	443	7–1 (1–0)
2/12; 8 p.m.	@ McKendree*	#10	Melvin Price Convocation Center; Lebanon, IL	GLVC SN	W 3–1 (25–20, 25–21, 22–25, 25–19)	570	8–1 (2–0)
2/17; 7 p.m.	Purdue Fort Wayne*	#7	Worthen Arena; Muncie, IN	ESPN+	W 3–2 (25–21, 26–28, 23–25, 25–20, 15–6)	819	9–1 (3–0)
2/19; 3 p.m.	Loyola Chicago*	#7	Worthen Arena; Muncie, IN	Ball State All-Access	L 1–3 (25–19, 23–25, 21–25, 20–25)	1,462	9–2 (3–1)
2/24; 7 p.m.	Lindenwood*	#8	Worthen Arena; Muncie, IN	Ball State All-Access	W 3–1 (22–25, 25–20, 26–24, 25–21)	749	10–2 (4–1)
2/25; 7 p.m.	Quincy*	#8	Worthen Arena; Muncie, IN	ESPN3	W 3–0 (25–22, 25–17, 25–19)	899	11–2 (5–1)
3/11; 6 p.m.	@ #15 NJIT	#8	Wellness and Events Center; Newark, NJ	America East TV	W 3–1 (26–24, 25–22, 28–30, 36–34)	221	12–2
3/12; 5 p.m.	@ Princeton	#8	Jadwin Gymnasium; Princeton, NJ	ESPN+	W 3–0 (25–16, 26–24, 25–20)	0	13–2
3/16; 7 p.m.	@ Ohio State*	#8	Covelli Center; Columbus, OH	B1G+	W 3–2 (26–24, 18–25, 25–23, 19–25, 17–15)	563	14–2 (6–1)
3/19; 7 p.m.	Ohio State*	#8	Worthen Arena; Muncie, IN	Ball State All-Access	W 3–1 (26–24, 25–16, 23–25, 25–22)	2,295	15–2 (7–1)
3/25; 7 p.m.	@ Quincy*	#8	Pepsi Arena; Quincy, IL	GLVC SN	W 3–0 (25–13, 25–19, 27–25)	50	16–2 (8–1)
3/26; 7 p.m.	@ Lindenwood*	#8	Robert F. Hyland Arena; St. Charles, MO	GLVC SN	W 3–0 (25–23, 25–13, 25–23)	256	17–2 (9–1)
3/31; 7 p.m.	#15 McKendree	#7	Worthen Arena; Muncie, IN	ESPN+	W 3–0 (25–17, 27–25, 25–20)	775	18–2 (10–1)
4/2; 5 p.m.	#13 Lewis*	#7	Worthen Arena; Muncie, IN	Ball State All-Access	W 3–0 (25–19, 26–24, 25–20)	880	19–2 (11–1)
4/7; 8 p.m.	@ #11 Loyola Chicago*	#7	Joseph J. Gentile Arena; Chicago, IL	ESPN+	L 0–3 (18–25, 19–25, 26–28)	911	19–3 (11–2)
4/9; 7 p.m.	@ Purdue Fort Wayne*	#7	Hilliard Gates Sports Center; Fort Wayne, IN	ESPN+	W 3–1 (33–31, 19–25, 25–22, 29–27)	628	20–3 (12–2)
4/16; 7 p.m.	Quincy^{(8)}	#7^{(1)}	Worthen Arena (MIVA Quarterfinals)	ESPN3	W 3–0 (25–17, 25–20, 25–11)	725	21–3
4/20; 7 p.m.	#12 Lewis^{(4)}	#7^{(1)}	Worthen Arena (MIVA Semifinals)	ESPN3	W 3–0 (25–23, 25–17, 25–15)	913	22–3
4/23; 7 p.m.	Purdue Fort Wayne^{(6)}	#7^{(1)}	Worthen Arena (MIVA Championship)	ESPN3	W 3–0 (28–26, 25–20, 25–16)	1,545	23–3

*-Indicates conference match.
Times listed are Eastern Time Zone.

== Broadcasters ==
- Maryville: Baylen Hite & Amber Seaman
- Tusculum: No commentary
- George Mason: Baylen Hite & Amber Seaman
- Hawai'i: Joel Godett & Amber Seaman
- Hawai'i: Joel Godett & Kevin Owens
- BYU: Jarom Jordan, Steve Vail & Kiki Solano
- BYU: Jarom Jordan, Steve Vail, & Kiki Solano
- Lewis: Cody Lindeman, Juliana Van Loo, & Ally Hickey
- McKendree: Colin Suhre
- Purdue Fort Wayne: Baylen Hite & Kevin Owens
- Loyola Chicago: No commentary
- Lindenwood: No commentary
- Quincy: Joel Godett & Lloy Ball
- NJIT: Ira Thor
- Princeton: Adam Dobrowolski & Melina Mahood
- Ohio State: Brendan Gulick & Hanna Williford
- Ohio State: No commentary
- Quincy: No commentary
- Lindenwood: Michael Wagenknecht & Sara Wagenknecht
- McKendree: Donnie Harmon, Nathan Ganger, & Dominick Liacone
- Lewis: No commentary
- Loyola Chicago: Scott Sudikoff & Kris Berzins
- Purdue Fort Wayne: Mike Maahs
- MIVA Quarterfinal- Quincy: Baylen Hite, Jordan Kilmes, & Lexi Eblen
- MIVA Semifinal- Lewis: Joel Godett, Kevin Owens, & Madison Surface
- MIVA Championship- Purdue Fort Wayne: Joel Godett, Amber Seaman, & Madison Surface

== Rankings ==
Ranking movements Legend: ██ Increase in ranking ██ Decrease in ranking RV = Received votes
	Week																	
Poll	Pre	1	2	3	4	5	6	7	8	9	10	11	12	13	14	15	16	Final
AVCA Coaches	15	RV	RV	15	10	10	7	8	9	8	8	8	7	7	7	7		
Off the Block Media	Not released	RV	RV	RV	8	9	4	7										

^The Media did not release a pre-season poll.

== Honors ==
To be filled in upon competition of the season.
