= 2022 Independent Volleyball Association tournament =

Volleyball Tournament

2022 Independent Volleyball Association Men's Volleyball Tournament
- Classification: Division I/II
- Teams: 8
- Site: Curry Arena; Charlotte, NC
- Champions: Lincoln Memorial
- Winning coach: John Cash (4th title)
- Television: Queens SN
- Independent Volleyball Association Men's Volleyball Tournaments

The 2022 Independent Volleyball Association Tournament was a men's volleyball tournament held by select Independent Universities during the 2022 NCAA Division I & II men's volleyball season. It was held April 22 through April 23, 2022 at Queens University of Charlotte's Curry Arena at the Levine Center. The winner was eligible for one of the two wildcard spots in the 2022 NCAA Volleyball Tournament and was granted the title of Independent Volleyball Association Champion.

2022 NCAA Division I & II Independent Volleyball Association standings
	Conf.				Overall
Team	W		L	PCT	W		L	PCT
Daemen ‍‍‍	0	–	0	–	14	–	5	.737
Lincoln Memorial ‍‍‡‍	0	–	0	–	17	–	7	.708
Limestone ‍‍‍	0	–	0	–	17	–	9	.654
Maryville ‍‍‍	0	–	0	–	19	–	11	.633
Queens ‍‍‍	0	–	0	–	16	–	11	.593
D'Youville ‍‍‍	0	–	0	–	8	–	11	.421
LIU ‍‍‍	0	–	0	–	13	–	15	.464
Fairleigh Dickinson ‍‍‍	0	–	0	–	6	–	14	.300
Tusculum ‍‍‍	0	–	0	–	6	–	19	.240
Alderson Broaddus ‍‍‍	0	–	0	–	6	–	20	.231
American International ‍‍‍	0	–	0	–	2	–	16	.111
‡ – 2022 IVA Tournament champion Rankings from AVCA

== Seeds ==
Eight teams participated in the tournament with Fairleigh Dickinson participating for the first time in their inaugural season. D'Youville and Daemen also returned after missing 2021 due to state-imposed COVID-19 travel restrictions. The seeding was determined by head-to-head matches played during the regular season against the other North and South Region schools.

Coincidentally, this was the final season for all three of the top seeds in IVA North as independents. On September 30, 2021, Fairleigh Dickinson's full-time home of the Northeast Conference (NEC) announced that it would begin sponsoring men's volleyball in the 2023 season, with FDU joined by five other full NEC members. Shortly after the IVA tournament, the NEC announced on May 19 that Daemen and D'Youville would also join its new men's volleyball league for the 2023 season.

Seed	School	IVA North Record
N1	Daemen	3–0
N2	Fairleigh Dickinson	4–2
N3	D'Youville	2–4
N4	Alderson Broaddus	0–3

Seed	School	IVA South Record
S1	Lincoln Memorial	6–0
S2	Queens	4–2
S3	Limestone	2–4
S4	Tusculum	0–6

== Schedule and results ==
Time Network	Matchup	Score	Attendance	Commentators	Report
Quarterfinals – Friday, April 22
10:30 am Queens SN	No. S1 Lincoln Memorial vs. No. N4 Alderson Broaddus	3–0 (25–16, 25–16, 25–18)	72	Mike Foiles	Recap
10:30 am Queens SN	No. N2 Fairleigh Dickinson vs. No. S3 Limestone	0–3 (10–25, 16–25, 21–25)	200	Jack Fitzpatrick	Recap
1:30 pm Queens SN	No. N1 Daemen vs. No. S4 Tusculum	3–0 (34–32, 25–22, 25–20)	250	Jack Fitzpatrick	Recap
1:30 pm Queens SN	No. S2 Queens vs. No. N3 D'Youville	3–0 (25–21, 25–11, 25–14)	91	Mike Foiles	Recap
Semifinals – Friday, April 22
4:30 pm Queens SN	No. S1 Lincoln Memorial vs. No. S3 Limestone	3–0 (25–23, 25–19, 25–22)	87	Mike Foiles	Recap
7:30 pm Queens SN	No. N1 Daemen vs. No. S2 Queens	3–1 (25–18, 20–25, 25–18, 25–22)	113	Mike Foiles	Recap
Consolation Bracket – Friday, April 22
4:30 pm Queens SN	No. N4 Alderson Broaddus vs. No. N2 Fairleigh Dickinson	1–3 (15–25, 23–25, 25–23, 12–25)	163	Jack Fitzpatrick	Recap
7:30 pm Queens SN	No. S4 Tusculum vs. No. N3 D'Youville	3–0 (25–23, 25–15, 25–17)	230	Jack Fitzpatrick	Recap
7th Place Match – Saturday, April 23
10:30 am	No. N4 Alderson Broaddus vs. No. N3 D'Youville	0–3 (20–25, 17–25, 25–27)	100		
5th Place Match – Saturday, April 23
10:30 am	No. N2 Fairleigh Dickinson vs. No. S4 Tusculum	2–3 (27–25, 19–25, 25–19, 23–25, 9–15)	45		
3rd Place Match – Saturday, April 23
2:00 pm Queens SN	No. S3 Limestone vs. No. S2 Queens	0–3 (17–25, 17–25, 23–25)	77	Mike Foiles	
Championship – Saturday, April 23
5:00 pm Queens SN	No. S1 Lincoln Memorial vs. No. N1 Daemen	3–0 (25–20, 25–19, 25–13)	89	Mike Foiles	
Game times are ET. Rankings denote tournament seeding.

== Bracket ==
5th Place Game; Saturday, April 23
N2	Fairleigh Dickinson	2
S4	Tusculum	3
7th Place Game; Saturday, April 23
N4	Alderson Broaddus	0
N3	D'Youville	3

Consolation 2nd Round; Friday, April 22
N4	Alderson Broaddus	1
N2	Fairleigh Dickinson	3
S4	Tusculum	3
N3	D'Youville	0

First Round; Friday, April 22
S1	Lincoln Memorial	3
N4	Alderson Broaddus	0
N2	Fairleigh Dickinson	0
S3	Limestone	3
N1	Daemen	3
S4	Tusculum	1
S2	Queens	3
N3	D'Youville	0

Semifinals; Friday, April 22
S1	Lincoln Memorial	3
S3	Limestone	0
N1	Daemen	3
S2	Queens	1

Championship; Saturday, April 23
S1	Lincoln Memorial	3
N1	Daemen	0
3rd Place Game; Saturday, April 23
S3	Limestone	0
S2	Queens	3
