= 2022 Purdue Fort Wayne Mastodons men's volleyball team =

American college volleyball season

2022 Purdue Fort Wayne Mastodons men's volleyball
- Conference: Midwestern Intercollegiate Volleyball Association
- Record: 17–13 (6–8 MIVA)
- Head coach: Ryan Perrotte (7th season)
- Assistant coaches: Lindsay Brown (3rd season); Jim Palilonis (1st season)
- Home arena: Hilliard Gates Sports Center

2022 Midwestern Intercollegiate Volleyball Association standings
	Conf.				Overall
Team	W		L	PCT	W		L	PCT
No. 3 Ball State ‍†‍‡‍^{y}	12	–	2	.857	23	–	4	.852
No. 12 Loyola Chicago ‍‍‍	11	–	3	.786	18	–	9	.667
McKendree ‍‍‍	9	–	5	.643	14	–	11	.560
No. 14 Lewis ‍‍‍	7	–	7	.500	16	–	12	.571
Ohio State ‍‍‍	7	–	7	.500	13	–	14	.481
No. 15 Purdue Fort Wayne ‍‍‍	6	–	8	.429	17	–	13	.567
Lindenwood ‍‍‍	4	–	10	.286	8	–	14	.364
Quincy ‍‍‍	0	–	14	.000	4	–	19	.174
† – Conference champion ‡ – MIVA tournament champion y – Invited to the NCAA tournament Rankings from AVCA

The 2022 Purdue Fort Wayne Mastodons men's volleyball team represented Purdue University Fort Wayne in the 2022 NCAA Division I & II men's volleyball season. The Mastodons, led by seventh year head coach Ryan Perrotte, played their home games at Hilliard Gates Sports Center. The Mastodons were members of the Midwestern Intercollegiate Volleyball Association and were picked to finish sixth in the MIVA in the preseason poll.

== Roster ==
2022 Purdue Fort Wayne Mastodons roster
Defensive specialist/libero: 2 Wilmer Hernandez - Junior; 3 Troy Gooch - Senior; 14 kJ Glab - Freshman; Middle blockers: 1 Rico Wardlow - Junior; 8 Mark Frazier - Freshman; 12 Cody Johnson - Senior; 22 Bryce Walker - Sophomore	Outside hitters: 4 Jon Diedrich - Junior; 6 Kade Bontrager - Graduate; 7 Axel Melendez Watts - Freshman; 11 Carlos Mercado - Junior; 13 Mitch Geiger - Junior; 17 Vicente Ibarra - Sophomore; 18 Hunter Clasen - Sophomore; 20 Jacob Mailloux - (redshirt) Junior; xx Cree Thompson - Freshman	Opposite hitters: 4 Jon Diedrich - Junior; 11 Carlos Mercado - Junior; Setters: 5 Sean Califf - Junior; 15 Davey Singer - Freshman; 16 Zach Solomon - Freshman

== Schedule ==
Date time	Opponent	Rank	Arena city (tournament)	Television	Score	Attendance	Record (MIVA Record)
1/7; 5 p.m.	@ King		Student Center Complex; Bristol, TN	Conference Carolinas DN	W 3–0 (25–21, 25–19, 25–20)	158	1–0
1/8; 7 p.m.	@ Lincoln Memorial		Mary Mars Gymnasium; Harrogate, TN	Lincoln Memorial SN	L 0–3 (23–25, 21–25, 14–25)	126	1–1
1/14; 7 p.m.	Maryville		Hilliard Gates Sports Center; Fort Wayne, IN	ESPN+	W 3–0 (25–21, 25–16, 25–15)	227	2–1
1/20; 7 p.m.	George Mason		Hilliard Gates Sports Center; Fort Wayne, IN	ESPN+	L 2–3 (25–18, 25–20, 21–25, 20–25, 14–16)	372	2–2
1/22; 7 p.m.	@ St. Francis Brooklyn		Generoso Pope Athletic Complex; Brooklyn, NY	NEC Front Row	W 3–1 (25–11, 20–25, 25–12, 25–17)	50	3–2
1/23; 1 p.m.	@ NJIT		Wellness and Events Center; Newark, NJ	America East TV	L 0–3 (16–25, 19–25, 24–26)	144	3–3
1/28; 7 p.m.	St. Francis		Hilliard Gates Sports Center; Fort Wayne, IN	ESPN+	W 3–1 (22–25, 25–21, 25–21, 26–24)	216	4–3
1/29; 3 p.m.	St. Francis		Hilliard Gates Sports Center; Fort Wayne, IN	YouTube	L 2–3 (23–25, 23–25, 25–20, 25–23, 13–15)	123	4–4
2/4; 7 p.m.	@ Sacred Heart		William H. Pitt Center; Fairfield, CT	NEC Front Row	W 3–1 (25–21, 25–16, 24–26, 25–21)	117	5–4
2/17; 7 p.m.	@ Harvard		Malkin Athletic Center; Cambridge, NA	ESPN+	W 3–1 (25–17, 20–25, 26–24, 25–20)	150	6–4
2/11; 8 p.m.	Lindenwood*		Hilliard Gates Sports Center; Fort Wayne, IN	YouTube	W 3–1 (25–13, 26–24, 24–26, 18–25)	480	7–4 (1–0)
2/12; 3 p.m.	Quincy*		Hilliard Gates Sports Center; Fort Wayne, IN	YouTube	W 3–0 (25–18, 27–25, 25–22)	371	8–4 (2–0)
2/17; 7 p.m.	@ #7 Ball State*		Worthen Arena; Muncie, IN	ESPN+	L 2–3 (21–25, 28–26, 25–23, 20–25, 6–15)	819	8–5 (2–1)
2/20; 3 p.m.	@ #14 Ohio State*		Covelli Center; Columbus, OH	B1G+	L 0–3 (21–25, 18–25, 23–25)	788	8–6 (2–2)
2/24; 5 p.m.	@ #10 Lewis*		Neil Carey Arena; Romeoville, IL	GLVC SN	W 3–0 (25–23, 25–23, 25–22)	200	9–6 (3–2)
2/26; 6 p.m.	McKendree*		Hilliard Gates Sports Center; Fort Wayne, IN	ESPN+	W 3–2 (25–23, 25–23, 25–27, 24–26, 15–12)	216	10–6 (4–2)
3/4; 7 p.m.	@ #12 Loyola Chicago*		Joseph J. Gentile Arena; Chicago, IL	ESPN+	L 0–3 (21–25, 20–25, 20–25)	393	10–7 (4–3)
3/11; 7 p.m.	@ Charleston (WV)		Russell and Martha Wehrle Innovation Center; Charleston, WV	Mountain East Network	W 3–0 (25–21, 25–23, 25–15)	111	11–7
3/12; 2 p.m.	@ Central State		Beacom-Lewis Gym; Wilberforce, OH	Marauder SN	W 3–0 (25–17, 25–22, 25–20)	131	12–7
3/17; 7 p.m.	Daemen		Hilliard Gates Sports Center; Fort Wayne, IN	ESPN+	W 3–2 (25–20, 22–25, 25–21, 18–25, 15–8)	148	13–7
3/19; 5 p.m.	#11 Loyola Chicago*		Hilliard Gates Sports Center; Fort Wayne, IN	ESPN+	L 1–3 (28–26, 23–25, 20–25, 19–25)	200	13–8 (4–4)
3/24; 7 p.m.	#12 Lewis*		Hilliard Gates Sports Center; Fort Wayne, IN	ESPN+	L 0–3 (23–25, 19–25, 21–25)	419	13–9 (4–5)
3/26; 6 p.m.	@ McKendree*		Melvin Price Convocation Center; Lebanon, IL	GLVC SN	L 1–3 (24–26, 25–23, 21–25, 16–25)	200	13–10 (4–6)
3/31; 7 p.m.	@ Quincy*		Pepsi Arena; Quincy, IL	GLVC SN	W 3–0 (25–13, 25–21, 25–20)	200	14–10 (5–6)
4/2; 3 p.m.	@ Lindenwood*		Robert F. Hyland Arena; St. Charles, MO	GLVC SN	W 3–1 (25–15, 21–25, 25–23, 25–17)	224	15–10 (6–6)
4/7; 7 p.m.	Ohio State*		Hilliard Gates Sports Center; Fort Wayne, IN	ESPN+	L 2–3 (21–25, 25–20, 28–26, 25–27, 12–15)	593	15–11 (6–7)
4/9; 7 p.m.	#7 Ball State*		Hilliard Gates Sports Center; Fort Wayne, IN	ESPN+	L 1–3 (31–33, 25–19, 22–25, 27–29)	628	15–12 (6–8)
4/16; 8 p.m.	@ #15 McKendree		Melvin Price Convocation Center; Lebanon, IL (MIVA Quarterfinals)	GLVC SN	W 3–1 (26–24, 25–20, 23–25, 25–22)	190	16–12
4/20; 8 p.m.	@ #11 Loyola Chicago		Joseph J. Gentile Arena; Chicago, IL	ESPN+	W 3–0 (32–30, 25–23, 27–25)	489	17–12
4/23; 7 p.m.	@ #7 Ball State		Worthen Arena; Muncie, IN	ESPN3	L 0–3 (26–28, 20–25, 16–25)	1,545	17–13

*-Indicates conference match.
Times listed are Eastern Time Zone.

== Broadcasters ==
- King: Brittney Ramsey & Julie Ward
- Lincoln Memorial: Adam Haley
- Maryville: Mike Maahs
- George Mason: Mike Maahs
- St. Francis Brooklyn: Marc Ernay
- NJIT: Ira Thor
- St. Francis: Mike Maahs
- St. Francis: Mike Maahs & Steve Florio
- Sacred Heart: Brendan Picozzi
- Harvard: Dylan Hornblum
- Lindenwood: Mike Maahs
- Quincy: Mike Maahs
- Ball State: Baylen Hite & Kevin Owens
- Ohio State: Tyler Danburg & Hanna Williford
- Lewis: Cody Lindeman, Farah Taki, & Megan Schlechte
- McKendree: Mike Maahs & Victoria Brisack
- Loyola Chicago: Scott Sudikoff & Ray Gooden
- Charleston (WV): No commentary
- Central State: Doug Brown
- Daemen: Mike Maahs & Victoria Brisack
- Loyola Chicago: Mike Maahs
- Lewis: Mike Maahs
- McKendree: Colin Suhre
- Quincy: No commentary
- Lindenwood: Michael Wagenknecht & Sara Wagenknecht
- Ohio State: Mike Maahs & Steve Florio
- Ball State: Mike Maahs
- McKendree: Colin Suhre
- Loyola Chicago: Scott Sudikoff & Ray Gooden
- Ball State: Joel Godett, Amber Seaman, & Madison Surface

== Honors ==
To be filled in upon completion of the season.
