= 2022 Conference Carolinas men's volleyball tournament =

Volleyball tournament

2022 Conference Carolinas Men's Volleyball Tournament
- Classification: Division I/II
- Teams: 8
- Site: Kornegay Arena; Mount Olive, North Carolina
- Champions: North Greenville
- Television: Conference Carolinas DN
- Conference Carolinas Men's Volleyball Tournaments

The 2022 Conference Carolinas men's volleyball tournament is the men's volleyball tournament for Conference Carolinas during the 2022 NCAA Division I & II men's volleyball season. It was held April 13 through April 23, 2022. First Round and Quarterfinal matches were held at campus sites while the semifinals and championship were held at Kornegay Arena in Mount Olive, North Carolina. The winner received the conference's automatic bid to the 2022 NCAA Volleyball Tournament.

2022 Conference Carolinas men's volleyball standings
	Conf.				Overall
Team	W		L	PCT	W		L	PCT
North Greenville ‍†‍‡‍^{y}	12	–	2	.857	20	–	5	.800
Mount Olive ‍‍‍	11	–	3	.786	16	–	7	.696
King ‍‍‍	11	–	3	.786	17	–	11	.607
Emmanuel ‍‍‍	7	–	7	.500	15	–	13	.536
Erskine ‍‍‍	6	–	8	.429	13	–	18	.419
Belmont Abbey ‍‍‍	5	–	9	.357	15	–	16	.484
Lees–McRae ‍‍‍	4	–	10	.286	8	–	15	.348
Barton ‍‍‍	0	–	14	.000	0	–	20	.000
† – Conference champion ‡ – Conference Carolinas tournament champion y – Invited to the NCAA tournament Rankings from AVCA

== Seeds ==
All 8 teams are eligible for the postseason. A bye system is used awarding higher seeds byes to the quarter and semifinals. Teams are seeded by record within the conference, with a tiebreaker system to seed teams with identical conference records.

Seed	School	Conference	Tiebreaker
1	North Greenville	12–2	–
2	King	11–3	5–4 sets won vs. Mount Olive
3	Mount Olive	11–3	4–5 sets won vs. King
4	Emmanuel	7–7	–
5	Erskine	6–8	–
6	Belmont Abbey	5–9	–
7	Lees-McRae	4–10	–
8	Barton	0–14	–

== Schedule and results ==
Time	Matchup	Score	Attendance	Broadcasters	Report
First Round – Thursday, April 13
7:00 pm Conference Carolinas DN	No. 5 Erskine vs. No. 8 Barton	3–0 (25–18, 25–14, 25–19)	47	Ben Auten & Patrick Davenport	Recap
7:00 pm Conference Carolinas DN	No. 6 Belmont Abbey vs. No. 7 Lees-McRae	3–1 (25–13, 25–12, 23–25, 25–15)	106	Geoffrey Chiles	Recap
Quarterfinals – Tuesday, April 19
7:00 pm Conference Carolinas DN	No. 3 Mount Olive vs. No. 6 Belmont Abbey	3–2 (20–25, 25–19, 25–20, 23–25, 15–10)	132	Michael Deleo	Recap
7:00 pm Conference Carolinas DN	No. 4 Emmanuel vs. No. 5 Erskine	3–2 (25–20, 23–25, 23–25, 25–22, 15–10)	150	Logan Reese & Taylor Roberts	Recap
Semifinals – Friday, April 22
5:00 pm Conference Carolinas DN	No. 1 North Greenville vs. No. 4 Emmanuel	3–0 (25–19, 25–20, 25–12)	93	Michael Deleo	Recap
7:30 pm Conference Carolinas DN	No. 2 King vs. No. 3 Mount Olive	1–3 (19–25, 21–25, 25–18, 15–25)	184	Michael Deleo	Recap
Championship – Saturday, April 23
6:30 pm Conference Carolinas DN	No. 1 North Greenville vs. No. 3 Mount Olive	3–2 (25–22, 23–25, 25–16, 21–25, 15–7)	293	Michael Deleo	
All game times are ET. Rankings denote tournament seeding.

== Bracket ==
First Round; Wednesday, April 13
5	Erskine	3
8	Barton	0
6	Belmont Abbey	3
7	Lees-McRae	1

Quarterfinals; Tuesday, April 19
4	Emmanuel	3
5	Erskine	2
3	Mount Olive	3
6	Belmont Abbey	2

Semi-finals; Friday, April 22
1	North Greenville	3
4	Emmanuel	0
2	King	1
3	Mount Olive	3

Finals; Saturday, April 23
1	North Greenville	3
3	Mount Olive	2

== All–Tournament Team ==
To be filled in upon completion of the tournament.
