= 2022 Ohio State Buckeyes men's volleyball team =

American college volleyball season

2022 Ohio State Buckeyes men's volleyball
- Conference: Midwestern Intercollegiate Volleyball Association
- Record: 13–14 (7–7 MIVA)
- Head coach: Kevin Burch (3rd season)
- Assistant coaches: Hudson Bates (3rd season); Luke Wood Maloney (3rd season)
- Home arena: Covelli Center

2022 Midwestern Intercollegiate Volleyball Association standings
	Conf.				Overall
Team	W		L	PCT	W		L	PCT
No. 3 Ball State ‍†‍‡‍^{y}	12	–	2	.857	23	–	4	.852
No. 12 Loyola Chicago ‍‍‍	11	–	3	.786	18	–	9	.667
McKendree ‍‍‍	9	–	5	.643	14	–	11	.560
No. 14 Lewis ‍‍‍	7	–	7	.500	16	–	12	.571
Ohio State ‍‍‍	7	–	7	.500	13	–	14	.481
No. 15 Purdue Fort Wayne ‍‍‍	6	–	8	.429	17	–	13	.567
Lindenwood ‍‍‍	4	–	10	.286	8	–	14	.364
Quincy ‍‍‍	0	–	14	.000	4	–	19	.174
† – Conference champion ‡ – 2022 MIVA Tournament champion: y- Invited to the NCAA Volleyball Tournament As of March 17, 2025 Rankings from AVCA

The 2022 Ohio State Buckeyes men's volleyball team represented Ohio State University in the 2022 NCAA Division I & II men's volleyball season. The Buckeyes, led by 3rd year head coach Kevin Burch, played their home games at Covelli Center. The Buckeyes are members of the Midwestern Intercollegiate Volleyball Association and were picked to finish third in the MIVA in the preseason poll.

== Roster ==
2022 Ohio State Buckeyes roster
Defensive Specialist/Libero: 1 Grant Strong - Freshman; 2 Thomas Poole - Sophomore; 3 Parker Mikesch - Senior; Middle blockers: 4 Jason Kozvak - Freshman; 11 Justin Howard - (redshirt) Sophomore; 15 Ethan Talley - Senior; 16 Ben Braun - Freshman; 17 Samuel Clark - Junior; 18 Cole Young - Freshman	Outside hitters: 6 Martin Lallemand - Senior; 7 Jacob Pasteur - Sophomore; 10 Sean Ryan - Senior; 13 Sotiris Siapanis - Sophomore; 14 Kyle Teune - Freshman; 19 Jack Stevens - (redshirt) Junior	Opposite hitters: 4 Jason Kozak - Freshman; 16 Ben Braun - Freshman; 20 Jimmy Webb - Sophomore; Setters: 5 Noah Platfoot - Sophomore; 8 Michael Wright - Junior; 9 Luke Lentin - Senior

== Schedule ==
Date Time	Opponent	Rank	Arena City (Tournament)	Television	Score	Attendance	Record (MIVA Record)
1/07; 7 p.m.	Central State	#13	Covelli Center; Columbus, OH	B1G+	W 3–0 (25–16, 25–20, 25–20)	302	1–0
1/08; 7 p.m.	Central State	#13	Covelli Center; Columbus, OH	B1G+	W 3–0 (25–19, 25–17, 25–14)	597	2–0
1/12; 7 p.m.	St. Francis	#11	Covelli Center; Columbus, OH	B1G+	W 3–0 (25–18, 25–13, 25–20)	482	3–0
1/15; 8 p.m.	@ #2 UCLA	#11	Pauley Pavilion; Los Angeles, CA (Big Ten/Pac 12 Challenge)	P12 LA	L 2–3 (18–25, 15–25, 25–23, 25–23, 8–15)	0	3–1
1/21; 8 p.m.	vs. #12 USC	#11	Pauley Pavilion; Los Angeles, CA (Big Ten/Pac 12 Challenge)	P12 Insider	W 3–1 (26–24, 16–25, 25–18, 25–21)	1,047	4–1
1/28; 9 p.m.	@ #3 Long Beach State	#9	Walter Pyramid; Long Beach, CA (Battle of the Bigs)	ESPN+	L 1–3 (26–24, 20–25, 15–25, 22–25)	1,198	4–2
1/29; 10 p.m.	@ UC Santa Barbara	#9	The Thunderdome; Isla Vista, CA (Battle of the Bigs)	ESPN+	L 1–3 (19–25, 15–25, 28–26, 17–25)	176	4–3
2/04; 6 p.m.	Mount Olive	#12	Covelli Center; Columbus, OH	B1G+	Cancelled- Mount Olive Travel Concerns caused by Winter Storm Landon		
2/05; 3 p.m.	Mount Olive	#12	Covelli Center; Columbus, OH	B1G+	Cancelled- Mount Olive Travel Concerns caused by Winter Storm Landon		
2/10; 8 p.m.	@ McKendree*	#12	Melvin Price Convocation Center; Lebanon, IL	GLVC SN	L 1–3 (15–25, 23–25, 25–21, 22–25)	463	4–4 (0–1)
2/12; 8 p.m.	@ #6 Lewis*	#12	Neil Carey Arena; Romeoville, IL	GLVC SN	L 1–3 (21–25, 25–16, 26–28, 22–25)	373	4–5 (0–2)
2/17; 7 p.m.	Loyola Chicago*	#14	Covelli Center; Columbus, OH	B1G+	L 2–3 (25–22, 26–28, 25–23, 24–26, 14–16)	514	4–6 (0–3)
2/20; 3 p.m.	Purdue Fort Wayne*	#14	Covelli Center; Columbus, OH	B1G+	W 3–0 (25–21, 25–18, 25–23)	788	5–6 (1–3)
2/24; 7 p.m.	Quincy*	#15	Covelli Center; Columbus, OH	B1G+	W 3–0 (25–20, 25–20, 25–18)	300	6–6 (2–3)
2/25; 7 p.m.	Lindenwood*	#15	Covelli Center; Columbus, OH	B1G+	W 3–0 (25–16, 25–20, 25–19)	497	7–6 (3–3)
3/05; 7 p.m.	Lincoln Memorial	#13	Covelli Center; Columbus, OH	B1G+	W 3–0 (31–29, 25–12, 25–19)	1,078	8–6
3/06; 4 p.m.	Lincoln Memorial	#13	Covelli Center; Columbus, OH	B1G+	W 3–0 (25–14, 25–20, 25–22)	673	9–6
3/08; 7 p.m.	#3 Penn State	#13	Covelli Center; Columbus, OH (Big Ten Showdown)	B1G+	L 0–3 (23–25, 21–25, 21–25)	913	9–7
3/12; 7 p.m.	@ St. Francis	#13	William H. Pitt Center; Loretto, PA	NEC Front Row	L 1–3 (25–17, 20–25, 26–28, 22–25)	0	9–8
3/13; 3 p.m.	@ #3 Penn State	#13	Rec Hall; University Park, PA (Big Ten Showdown)	B1G+	L 1–3 (20–25, 21–25, 25–23, 15–25)	543	9–9
3/16; 7 p.m.	#8 Ball State*		Covelli Center; Columbus, OH	B1G+	L 2–3 (24–26, 25–18, 23–25, 25–19, 15–17)	563	9–10 (3–4)
3/19; 7 p.m.	@ #8 Ball State*		Worthen Arena; Muncie, IN	ESPN+	L 1–3 (24–26, 16–25, 25–23, 22–25)	2,295	9–11 (3–5)
3/25; 8 p.m.	@ Lindenwood*		Robert F. Hyland Arena; St. Charles, MO	GLVC SN	L 2–3 (24–26, 25–20, 28–30, 25–21, 10–15)	417	9–12 (3–6)
3/26; 3 p.m.	@ Quincy*		Pepsi Arena; Quincy, IL	GLVC SN	W 3–0 (25–17, 27–25, 25–20)	100	10–12 (4–6)
3/31; 7 p.m.	#13 Lewis*		Covelli Center; Columbus, OH	B1G+	'L 1–3 (24–26, 25–17, 23–25, 18–25)	647	10–13 (4–7)
4/02; 5 p.m.	McKendree*		Covelli Center; Columbus, OH	B1G+	W 3–2 (25–27, 25–23, 25–16, 19–25, 15–13)	886	11–13 (5–7)
4/07; 7 p.m.	@ Purdue Fort Wayne*		Hilliard Gates Sports Center; Fort Wayne, IN	ESPN+	W 3–2 (21–25, 25–20, 26–28, 27–25, 15–12)	593	12–13 (6–7)
4/09; 5 p.m.	@ #11 Loyola Chicago*		Joseph J. Gentile Arena; Chicago, IL	ESPN+	W 3–0 (25–17, 25–17, 25–21)	800	13–13 (7–7)
4/16; 8 p.m.	@ #13 Lewis^{(4)}	^{(5)}	Neil Carey Arena; Romeoville, IL (MIVA Quarterfinals)	GLVC SN	L 2–3 (25–19, 29–27, 23–25, 19–25, 10–15)	317	13–14

*-Indicates conference match.
Times listed are Eastern Time Zone.

== Broadcasters ==
- Central State: Brendan Gulick & Hanna Williford
- Central State: Brendan Gulick & Greg Franke
- St. Francis: Brendan Gulick & Neil Sika
- UCLA: Anne Marie Anderson
- USC: Denny Cline
- Long Beach State: Matt Brown & Tyler Kulakowski
- UC Santa Barbara: Max Kelton & Katie Spieler
- McKendree: Colin Suhre
- Lewis: Patrick Hennessey, Juliana Van Loo, & Ally Hickey
- Loyola Chicago: Keith Kokinda & Hanna Williford
- Purdue Fort Wayne: Tyler Danburg & Hanna Williford
- Quincy: Tyler Danburg & Hanna Williford
- Lindenwood: Brendan Gulick & Hanna Williford
- Lincoln Memorial: Tyler Danburg
- Lincoln Memorial: Greg Franke
- Penn State: Tyler Danburg & Joey Veer
- St. Francis: Matt Manz & Sophie Rice
- Penn State: Mac Young & Austin Groft
- Ball State: Brendan Gulick & Hanna Williford
- Ball State: No commentary
- Lindenwood: Michael Wagenknecht & Sara Wagenknecht
- Quincy: No commentary
- Lewis: Brendan Gulick & Zachary Rodier
- McKendree: Caleb Spinner & Hanna Williford
- Purdue Fort Wayne: Mike Maahs & Steve Florio
- Loyola Chicago: Scott Sudikoff & Kris Berzins
- Lewis: No commentary

== Rankings ==
Ranking movements Legend: ██ Increase in ranking ██ Decrease in ranking — = Not ranked RV = Received votes
	Week																	
Poll	Pre	1	2	3	4	5	6	7	8	9	10	11	12	13	14	15	16	Final
AVCA Coaches	13	11	11	9	12	12	14	15	13	13	13	13	RV	RV	RV	RV	RV	RV
Off the Block Media	Not released	RV	RV	9	RV	RV	RV	—	—	—	—	—	—	—	—	—	^	—

^The media did not release a pre-season poll.

== Honors ==
To be filled in upon completion of the season.
