= 2022 Mount Olive Trojans men's volleyball team =

American college volleyball season

2022 Mount Olive Trojans men's volleyball
- Conference: Conference Carolinas
- Record: 16–7 (11–3 CC)
- Head coach: Ali'i Keohohou (3rd season)
- Home arena: Kornegay Arena

2022 Conference Carolinas men's volleyball standings
	Conf.				Overall
Team	W		L	PCT	W		L	PCT
North Greenville ‍†‍‡‍^{y}	12	–	2	.857	20	–	5	.800
Mount Olive ‍‍‍	11	–	3	.786	16	–	7	.696
King ‍‍‍	11	–	3	.786	17	–	11	.607
Emmanuel ‍‍‍	7	–	7	.500	15	–	13	.536
Erskine ‍‍‍	6	–	8	.429	13	–	18	.419
Belmont Abbey ‍‍‍	5	–	9	.357	15	–	16	.484
Lees–McRae ‍‍‍	4	–	10	.286	8	–	15	.348
Barton ‍‍‍	0	–	14	.000	0	–	20	.000
† – Conference champion ‡ – Conference Carolinas tournament champion y – Invited to the NCAA tournament Rankings from AVCA

The 2022 Mount Olive Trojans men's volleyball team represented Mount Olive College in the 2022 NCAA Division I & II men's volleyball season. The Trojans, led by third year head coach Ali'i Keohohou, were picked to win the Conference Carolinas title in the coaches preseason poll, and they will host the 2022 Conference Carolinas men's volleyball tournament.

== Roster ==
2022 Mount Olive Trojans roster
Defensive Specialist/Libero: 1 Tristan Schraudner - Freshman; 14 Trevor Treser - Junior; 20 Jack Yerxa - Sophomore; Middle blockers: 4 Eric Visgitis - Senior; 19 Justin Gregory - Sophomore; 21 Pedro Gonzales - Junior; 24 Holden Maryott - Freshman	Outside hitters: 2 Chance Gallardo - Sophomore; 6 Louie Hadfield - Senior; 7 Jarrod Ferguson - Senior; 8 Blake Hosic - Freshman; 9 Tobi Azeez- Junior; 10 Tyran Gillespie - Senior; 15 Tom Klotzbuecher - Sophomore; 19 Justin Gregory - Sophomore	Opposite hitters: 3 Luke Visgitis - Senior; Setters: 5 Dominic Hagerty - Sophomore; 7 Jarrod Ferguson - Senior; 11 Oliver Merritt - Freshman

== Schedule ==
TV/Internet Streaming information:

All home games will be streamed on Conference Carolinas DN. Most road games will also be televised or streamed by the schools television or streaming service.

Date Time	Opponent	Rank	Arena City (Tournament)	Television	Score	Attendance	Record
1/05; 5 p.m.	Pepperdine		Kornegay Arena; Mount Olive, NC	Conference Carolinas DN	Cancelled- COVID-19		
1/06; 5 p.m.	Pepperdine		Kornegay Arena; Mount Olive, NC	Conference Carolinas DN	Cancelled- COVID-19		
1/15; 6 p.m.	George Mason		Kornegay Arena; Mount Olive, NC	Conference Carolinas DN	W 3–2 (23–25, 25–22, 17–25, 25–23, 15–12)	60	1–0
1/18; 7 p.m.	@ Queens		Curry Arena; Charlotte, NC	Queens Athletics on Stretch	W 3–1 (25–20, 25–13, 22–25, 25–19)	62	2–0
1/27; 9 p.m.	@ #8 BYU		Smith Fieldhouse; Provo, UT	BYUtv	L 2–3 (26–24, 19–25, 20–25, 25–22, 12–15)	2,509	2–1
1/29; 9 p.m.	@ #8 BYU		Smith Fieldhouse; Provo, UT	BYUtv	L 1–3 (24–26, 25–27, 25–19, 20–25)	3,224	2–2
2/04; 6 p.m.	@ #12 Ohio State		Covelli Center; Columbus, OH	B1G+	Cancelled- Travel Concerns caused by Winter Storm Landon		
2/05; 3 p.m.	@ #12 Ohio State		Covelli Center; Columbus, OH	B1G+	Cancelled- Travel Concerns caused by Winter Storm Landon		
2/11; 7 p.m.	@ North Greenville*		Hayes Gymnasium; Tigerville, SC	Conference Carolinas DN	L 2–3 (25–23, 22–25, 25–19, 24–26, 12–15)	315	2–3 (0–1)
2/12; 2 p.m.	@ Belmont Abbey*		Wheeler Center; Belmont, NC	Conference Carolinas DN	W 3–1 (25–18, 26–28, 25–19, 25–14)	156	3–3 (1–1)
2/23; 7 p.m.	@ Barton*		Wilson Gymnasium; Wilson, NC	Conference Carolinas DN	W 3–0 (25–10, 25–20, 25–14)	175	4–3 (2–1)
2/25; 7 p.m.	King*		Kornegay Arena; Mount Olive, NC	Conference Carolinas DN	W 3–2 (25–17, 23–25, 30–28, 23–25, 16–14)	164	5–3 (3–1)
2/26; 7 p.m.	Lees-McRae*		Kornegay Arena; Mount Olive, NC	Conference Carolinas DN	W 3–1 (25–12, 25–15, 23–25, 25–13)	95	6–3 (4–1)
3/02; 6 p.m.	Queens		Kornegay Arena; Mount Olive, NC	Conference Carolinas DN	PPD until April 5		
3/05; 6 p.m.	Tusculum		Kornegay Arena; Mount Olive, NC	Conference Carolinas DN	W 3–1 (16–25, 25–21, 25–23, 26–24)	132	7–3
3/18; 7 p.m.	@ Erskine*		Belk Arena; Due West, SC	Conference Carolinas DN	W 3–0 (25–16, 26–24, 25–20)	50	8–3 (5–1)
3/19; 2 p.m.	@ Emmanuel*		Shaw Athletic Center; Franklin Springs, GA	Conference Carolinas DN	W 3–0 (25–20, 25–16, 25–20)	120	9–3 (6–1)
3/25; 7 p.m.	Belmont Abbey*		Kornegay Arena; Mount Olive, NC	Conference Carolinas DN	W 3–0 (25–20, 25–20, 25–19)	198	10–3 (7–1)
3/26; 2 p.m.	North Greenville*		Kornegay Arena; Mount Olive, NC	Conference Carolinas DN	L 2–3 (19–25, 25–23, 21–25, 26–24, 14–16)	92	10–4 (7–2)
3/29; 7 p.m.	Barton*		Kornegay Arena; Mount Olive, NC	Conference Carolinas DN	W 3–0 (25–12, 25–22, 25–10)	184	11–4 (8–2)
4/01; 7 p.m.	Emmanuel*		Kornegay Arena; Mount Olive, NC	Conference Carolinas DN	W 3–0 (25–18, 25–17, 25–23)	183	12–4 (9–2)
4/02; 2 p.m.	Erskine*		Kornegay Arena; Mount Olive, NC	Conference Carolinas DN	W 3–2 (25–17, 21–25, 23–25, 27–25, 18–16)	83	13–4 (10–2)
4/05; 6 p.m.	Queens		Kornegay Arena; Mount Olive, NC	Conference Carolinas DN	L 2–3 (25–20, 27–25, 22–25, 14–25, 9–15)	64	13–5
4/08; 6 p.m.	@ Lees-McRae*		Williams Gymnasium; Banner Elk, NC	Conference Carolinas DN	W 3–1 (25–19, 25–17, 17–25, 25–22)	231	14–5 (11–2)
4/09; 2 p.m.	@ King*		Student Center Complex; Bristol, TN	Conference Carolinas DN	L 1–3 (19–25, 19–25, 25–23, 16–25)	269	14–6 (11–3)
4/19; 7 p.m.	Belmont Abbey^{(6)}	^{(3)}	Kornegay Arena; Mount Olive, NC (Conference Carolinas Quarterfinal)	Conference Carolinas DN	W 3–2 (20–25, 25–19, 25–20, 23–25, 15–10)	133	15–6
4/22; 7:30 p.m.	King^{(2)}	^{(3)}	Kornegay Arena; Mount Olive, NC (Conference Carolinas Semifinal)	Conference Carolinas DN			

*-Indicates conference match.
Times listed are Eastern Time Zone.

== Announcers for televised games ==
- George Mason: Alex Hayden
- Queens: Mike Glennon
- BYU: Spencer Linton, Steve Vail & Kiki Solano
- BYU: Spencer Linton, Steve Vail, & Kiki Solano
- North Greenville: Noah Frary
- Belmont Abbey: Geoffrey Chiles
- Barton: No commentary
- King: Aidan Gilbride
- Lees-McRae: Ruben van der Burg
- Tusculum: Ruben van der Burg & Michael Deleo
- Erskine: No commentary
- Emmanuel: Logan Reese & Taylor Roberts
- Belmont Abbey: Ruben van der Burg & Michael Deleo
- North Greenville: Michael Deleo
- Barton: Michael Deleo & Ruben van der Burg
- Emmanuel: Ruben van der Burg & Michael Deleo
- Erskine: Ruben van der Burg
- Queens: Michael Deleo & Ruben van der Burg
- Lees-McRae: Michael Marsans
- King: Brittany Ramsey & Julie Ward
- Belmont Abbey: Michael Deleo
- King:
