= 2022 Midwestern Intercollegiate Volleyball Association tournament =

Volleyball Tournament

2022 Midwestern Intercollegiate Volleyball Association Men's Volleyball Tournament
- Classification: Division I/II
- Teams: 8
- Champions: Ball State
- Midwestern Intercollegiate Volleyball Association Men's Volleyball Tournaments

The 2022 Midwestern Intercollegiate Volleyball Association Tournament is the men's volleyball tournament for the Midwestern Intercollegiate Volleyball Association held during the 2022 NCAA Division I & II men's volleyball season. It was held April 16 through April 23, 2022 at campus sites. The winner received the Association's automatic bid to the 2021 NCAA Volleyball Tournament.

2022 Midwestern Intercollegiate Volleyball Association standings
	Conf.				Overall
Team	W		L	PCT	W		L	PCT
No. 3 Ball State ‍†‍‡‍^{y}	12	–	2	.857	23	–	4	.852
No. 12 Loyola Chicago ‍‍‍	11	–	3	.786	18	–	9	.667
McKendree ‍‍‍	9	–	5	.643	14	–	11	.560
No. 14 Lewis ‍‍‍	7	–	7	.500	16	–	12	.571
Ohio State ‍‍‍	7	–	7	.500	13	–	14	.481
No. 15 Purdue Fort Wayne ‍‍‍	6	–	8	.429	17	–	13	.567
Lindenwood ‍‍‍	4	–	10	.286	8	–	14	.364
Quincy ‍‍‍	0	–	14	.000	4	–	19	.174
† – Conference champion ‡ – MIVA tournament champion y – Invited to the NCAA tournament Rankings from AVCA

== Seeds ==
All eight teams are eligible for the postseason, with the highest seed hosting each round. Teams were seeded by record within the conference, with a tiebreaker system to seed teams with identical conference records.

Seed	School	Conference	Tiebreaker
1	Ball State	12–2	–
2	Loyola Chicago	11–3	–
3	McKendree	9–5	–
4	Lewis	7–7	2-0 vs. Ohio State
5	Ohio State	7–7	0-2 vs. Lewis
6	Purdue Fort Wayne	6–8	–
7	Lindenwood	4–10	–
8	Quincy	0–14	–

== Schedule and results ==
Time Network	Matchup	Score	Attendance	Broadcasters
Quarterfinals – Saturday, April 16
5:00 pm ESPN+	No. 2 Loyola Chicago vs. No. 7 Lindenwood	3–0 (25–20, 25–19, 25–22)	253	Ray Gooden
6:00 pm ESPN3	No. 1 Ball State vs. No. 8 Quincy	3–0 (25–17, 25–20, 25–11)	725	Baylen Hite, Jordan Kilmes, & Lexi Eblen
6:00 pm GLVC SN	No. 4 Lewis vs. No. 5 Ohio State	3–2 (19–25, 27–29, 25–23, 25–19, 15–10)	317	No commentary
7:00 pm GLVC SN	No. 3 McKendree vs. No. 6 Purdue Fort Wayne	1–3 (24–26, 20–25, 25–23, 22–25)	190	Colin Suhre
Semifinals – Wednesday, April 20
6:00 pm ESPN3	No. 1 Ball State vs. No. 4 Lewis	3–0 (25–23, 25–17, 25–15)	913	Joel Godett, Kevin Owens, & Madison Surface
7:00 pm ESPN+	No. 2 Loyola Chicago vs. No. 6 Purdue Fort Wayne	0–3 (30–32, 23–25, 25–27)	489	Scott Sudikoff & Ray Gooden
Championship – Saturday, April 23
7:00 pm ESPN3	No. 1 Ball State vs. No. 6 Purdue Fort Wayne	3–0 (28–26, 25–20, 25–16)	1,545	Joel Godett, Amber Seaman, & Madison Surface
Game times are CT except for Ball State, which is ET. Rankings denote tournament seeding.

== Bracket ==
Quarterfinals; Saturday, April 16
1	Ball State	3
8	Quincy	0
4	Lewis	3
5	Ohio State	2
2	Loyola Chicago	3
7	Lindenwood	0
3	McKendree	1
6	Purdue Fort Wayne	3

Semifinals; Wednesday, April 20
1	Ball State	3
4	Lewis	0
2	Loyola Chicago	0
6	Purdue Fort Wayne	3

Championship; Saturday, April 23
1	Ball State	3
6	Purdue Fort Wayne	0
