= Kanoa Leahey =

American sportscaster

- Born: James Kanoa Leahey; 1977 (age 47–48); Honolulu, Hawaii
- Occupation(s): Sportscaster, Sports Director

James Kanoa Leahey, known as Kanoa Leahey, is a play-by-play announcer for UH sports and high school sports on Spectrum Sports, and for college basketball on the ESPN networks. He was also a former sports reporter for KHON-TV, the Honolulu Fox affiliate; and a former co-host of Leahey & Leahey, a weekly talk show featured on PBS Hawaii with his father, Jim (Leahey & Leahey Live). Following the death of longtime commentator Robert Kekaula, Leahey became the TV voice of Hawai'i Rainbow Warriors football in 2021.

Born and raised in Honolulu, Hawaii, the Iolani School alum got his first job as a sports reporter at KITV, Honolulu's ABC affiliate. After several years as the weekend sports anchor, he took over as the sports director at KHON-TV in 2004. In 2012, he stepped down to make more time for his national play-by-play work. He was replaced by Rob DeMello.

Leahey is a third generation sportscaster in Hawaii, and earned a Hawaii Sportscaster of the Year award, like his father, Jim Leahey, and grandfather, Chuck Leahey.
