= Ball State University =

Public university in Muncie, Indiana, US

Coordinates: 40.1983223°N 85.40894318°W

- Former names: Indiana State Normal School – Eastern Division (1918–1922); Ball Teachers College (1922–1929); Ball State Teachers College (1929–1961); Ball State College (1961–1965)
- Motto: "We Fly"
- Type: Public research university
- Established: 1918; 108 years ago
- Founders: Lucius L. Ball, William C. Ball, Edmund B. Ball, Frank C. Ball, George A. Ball
- Accreditation: HLC
- Academic affiliations: Space-grant
- Endowment: $422 million (2025)
- President: Geoffrey Mearns
- Provost: Anand Marri
- Academic staff: 1,257
- Students: 21,818
- Undergraduates: 15,950
- Postgraduates: 5,868
- Location: Muncie, Indiana, United States
- Campus: Small city, 1,140 acres (4.6 km^{2})
- Other campuses: Indianapolis; Fort Wayne; Fishers
- Newspaper: The Ball State Daily News
- Colors: Cardinal and white
- Nickname: Cardinals
- Sporting affiliations: NCAA Division I FBS – MAC; MIVA
- Mascot: Charlie Cardinal
- Website: www.bsu.edu

Ball State University (Ball State or BSU) is a public research university in Muncie, Indiana, United States. The university has three off-campus centers in Indianapolis, Fort Wayne, and Fishers, Indiana. The university is composed of ten academic colleges. As of 2023, the university enrolled about 20,400 students with 14,900 undergraduates and 5,500 graduate and doctoral students. The university offers about 120 undergraduate majors and 130 minor areas of study and more than 100 masters, doctoral, certificate, and specialist degrees.

In 1917, the Ball brothers, industrialists and founders of the Ball Corporation, acquired the foreclosed Indiana Normal Institute and gave the school and surrounding land to the State of Indiana. The Indiana General Assembly accepted the donation in the spring of 1918, with an initial 235 students enrolling at the Indiana State Normal School – Eastern Division on June 17, 1918. Ball State is classified among "R2: Doctoral Universities – High research activity".

Ball State athletic teams compete in Division I of the NCAA and are known as the Ball State Cardinals. The university is a member of the Mid-American Conference (MAC), competing at the Football Bowl Subdivision (FBS) Subdivision. Ball State's volleyball program is a member of the Midwestern Intercollegiate Volleyball Association (MIVA).

== History ==
=== Predecessor schools ===
The location of today's Ball State University had its start in 1899 as a private university called the Eastern Indiana Normal School. The entire school, including classrooms, a library, and the president's residence were housed in what is today's Frank A. Bracken Administration Building. The one-building school had a peak enrollment of 256 and charged $10 for a year's tuition. It operated until the spring of 1901, when it was closed due to lack of funding. In 1902, the school reopened as Palmer University for the next three years when Francis Palmer, a retired Indiana banker, gave the school $100,000 as an endowment.

Between 1905 and 1907, the school dropped the Palmer name and operated as the Indiana Normal College. It had two divisions, the Normal School for educating teachers and the College of applied sciences. The school had an average enrollment of about 200 students. Due to diminishing enrollment and lack of funding, the school closed at the end of the 1906–1907 school year. In 1912, a group of local investors led by Michael Kelly reopened the school as the Indiana Normal Institute. To pay for updated materials and refurbishing the once-abandoned Administration Building, the school operated under a mortgage from the Muncie Trust Company. Although the school had its largest student body with a peak enrollment of 806, officials could not maintain mortgage payments, and the school was forced to close once again in June 1917 when the Muncie Trust Company initiated foreclosure proceedings.

=== The Ball brothers and Ball State Teachers College era (1917–1960) ===
The Ball brothers from left to right: George, Lucius, Frank, Edmund, and William.

On July 25, 1917, the Ball brothers, local industrialists and founders of the Ball Corporation, bought the Indiana Normal Institute from foreclosure. The Ball brothers also founded Ball Memorial Hospital and Minnetrista, and were the benefactors of Keuka College, founded by their uncle, George Harvey Ball. For $35,100, the Ball brothers bought the Administration Building and surrounding land. In early 1918, during the Indiana General Assembly's short session, state legislators accepted the gift of the school and land by the Ball brothers. The state granted operating control of the Muncie campus and school buildings to the administrators of the Indiana State Normal School in Terre Haute (now Indiana State University. That same year, the Marion Normal Institute relocated to Muncie, adding its resources to what would officially be named the Indiana State Normal School – Eastern Division. An initial 235 students enrolled in 1918, with William W. Parsons serving as the first president of the university.

The close relationship between the Balls and the school led to an unofficial moniker for the college, with many students, faculty, and local politicians casually referring to the school as "Ball State," a shorthand alternative to its longer, official name. During the 1922 short session of the Indiana legislature, the state renamed the school Ball Teachers College. This was in recognition of the Ball family's continuing beneficence to the institution. During this act, the state also reorganized its relationship with Terre Haute and established a separate local board of trustees for the Muncie campus. In 1924, Ball Teachers College's trustees hired Benjamin J. Burris as the successor to President Linnaeus N. Hines. The Ball brothers continued giving to the university and partially funded the construction of the Science Hall (now called Burkhardt Building) in 1924 and an addition to Ball Gymnasium in 1925. By the 1925–1926 school year, Ball State enrollment reached 991 students: 697 women and 294 men. Based on the school's close relationship with the Ball Corporation, a long-running nickname for the school was "Fruit Jar Tech." During the regular legislative session of 1929, the General Assembly nominally separated the Terre Haute and Muncie campuses of the state teachers' college system, but it placed the governing of the Muncie campus under the Board of Trustees of what was now Indiana State Teachers College based in Terre Haute. With this action, the school was renamed Ball State Teachers College. The following year, enrollment increased to 1,118, with 747 female and 371 male students.

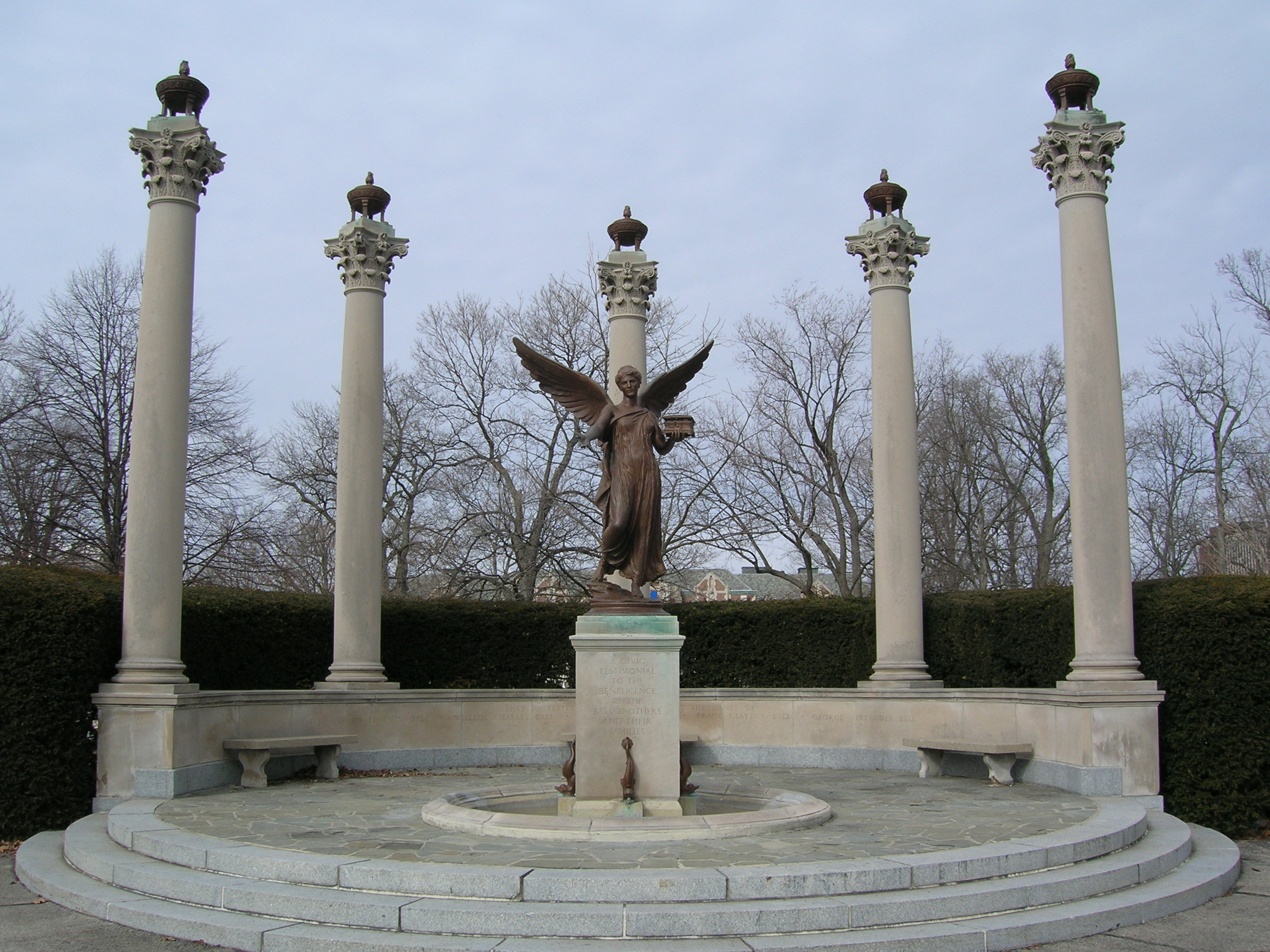
The Beneficence statue at the end of Talley Avenue

In 1935, the school added the Fine Arts Building for art, music, and dance instruction. Enrollment that year reached 1,151: 723 women and 428 men. As an expression of the many gifts from the Ball family since 1917, sculptor Daniel Chester French was commissioned by Muncie's chamber of commerce to cast a bronze fountain figure to commemorate the 20th anniversary of the Ball brothers' gift to the state. His creation, Beneficence, stands between the Administration Building and Lucina Hall where Talley Avenue ends at University Avenue.

Ball State, like the rest of the nation, was affected by the onset of World War II. There were several dramatic changes on Ball State's campus during World War II. In 1939 Ball State began its Civilian Pilot Training program which had popular enrollment. This program allowed students and local residents to learn to fly, instructed by the Muncie Aviation Company. By the fall of 1941, Ball State reached its peak enrollment to this point of 1,588 students. When the United States entered the war, Ball State like many other college campuses, saw a decline in male enrollment. At this time Ball State partnered with the United States military and established two training programs on campus, the Army Specialized Training Program and Navy V-1 Program. Each of these programs encouraged male enrollment in the college that also trained them to go on as pilots in the military service.

Ball State students and staff also contributed to the war effort by supporting the troops abroad. Students and staff led by Sherly DeMotte, a member of the English faculty, wrote dozens of letters to Ball State students and staff serving overseas. By 1943, a dozen students from Ball State had become war casualties. To bring awareness to their service, in 1943, the War Morale Committee dedicated the Roll of Honor; it listed the names of all those who served during the war.

=== Independent institution (1961–present) ===
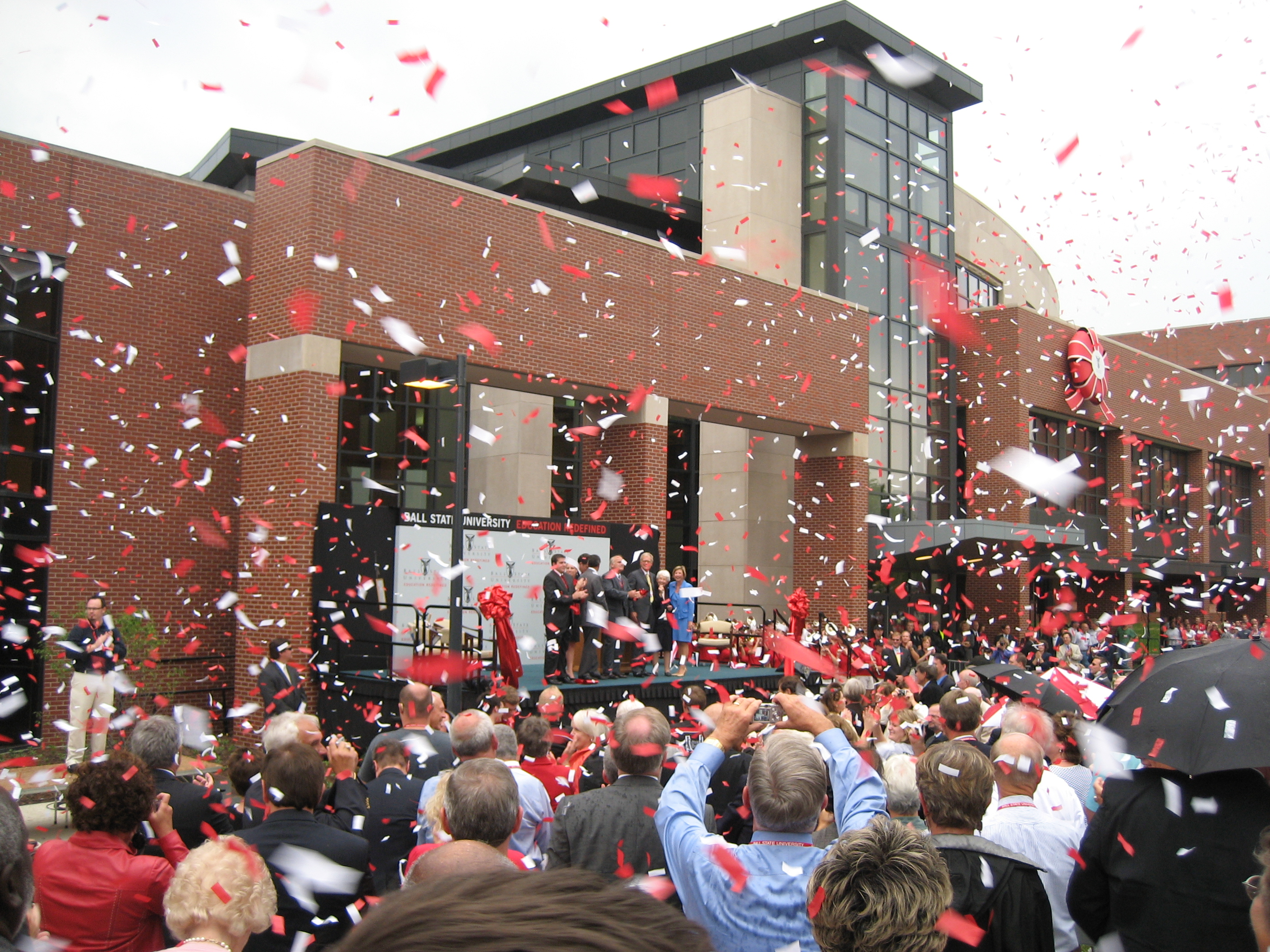
David Letterman Communication and Media Building dedication ceremony in 2007.

In 1961, Ball State became independent of Indiana State University through the creation of the Ball State College Board of Trustees. The official name of the school was also changed to Ball State College. The Indiana General Assembly approved the development of a state-assisted architecture program, establishing the College of Architecture and Planning, which opened on March 23, 1965. The Center for Radio and Television (now named the College of Communication, Information, and Media) opened the following year, in 1966.

Recognizing the college's expanding academic curriculum and growing enrollment (10,066 students), the General Assembly approved renaming the school to Ball State University in 1965. Most of the university's largest residence halls were completed during this period of high growth, including the DeHority Complex (1960), Noyer Complex (1962), Studebaker Complex (1965), LaFollette Complex (1967), and Johnson Complex (1969). Academic and athletic buildings, including Irving Gymnasium (1962), Emens Auditorium (1964), Cooper Science Complex (1967), Scheumann Stadium (1967), Carmichael Hall (1969), Teachers College Building (1969), Pruis Hall (1972), and Bracken Library (1974), also expanded the university's capacity and educational opportunities.

The university experienced another building boom beginning in the 2000s, with the openings of the Art and Journalism Building (2001), Shafer Tower (2001), the Music Instruction Building (2004), the David Letterman Communication and Media Building (2007), Park Hall (2007), Kinghorn Hall (2010), Marilyn K. Glick Center for Glass (2010), and the Student Recreation and Wellness Center (2010).

Under the university's 14th president, Dr. Jo Ann Gora, over $520 million was committed to new construction and renovation projects throughout the Ball State campus. Within the last decade, Ball State University adopted Education Redefined as its motto, focusing on "immersive learning" to engage students across all academic programs in real-world projects. To date, there have been over 1,250 immersive learning projects, impacting residents in all of Indiana's 92 counties under the mentoring of faculty from every academic department.

The university has also adopted environmental sustainability as a primary component of the university's strategic plan and vision. Starting in the mid-2000s, all building additions and renovations are designed to meet Leadership in Energy and Environmental Design (LEED) certification standards. Ball State announced in 2009 that it would begin construction on the largest geothermal energy conversion project in U.S. history.

The university was defendant in the U.S. Supreme Court case Vance v. Ball State University, which dealt with who can be regarded as a "supervisor" for harassment lawsuits. The case was argued on November 26, 2012. In a 5–4 decision, the court ruled in favor of Ball State.

In 2022, the final projects of the "North Neighborhood" were finished on the northern side of campus, where the LaFollette Complex once stood. The renovated residence halls included Botsford/Swinford (Johnson East) and Schmidt/Wilson (Johnson West). Jack Beyerl Hall, home of the STEM Living-Learning Community, and North West Hall, home of the Education and Design Living-Learning Communities were the two newly built residence halls adjacent to the new North Dining building. During construction, the former LaFollette Complex was demolished to make way for a new green space to be utilized by students and faculty with 10 pillars of Indiana limestone placed in the center in remembrance of the former residence hall.

== Campus ==
=== Main campus ===
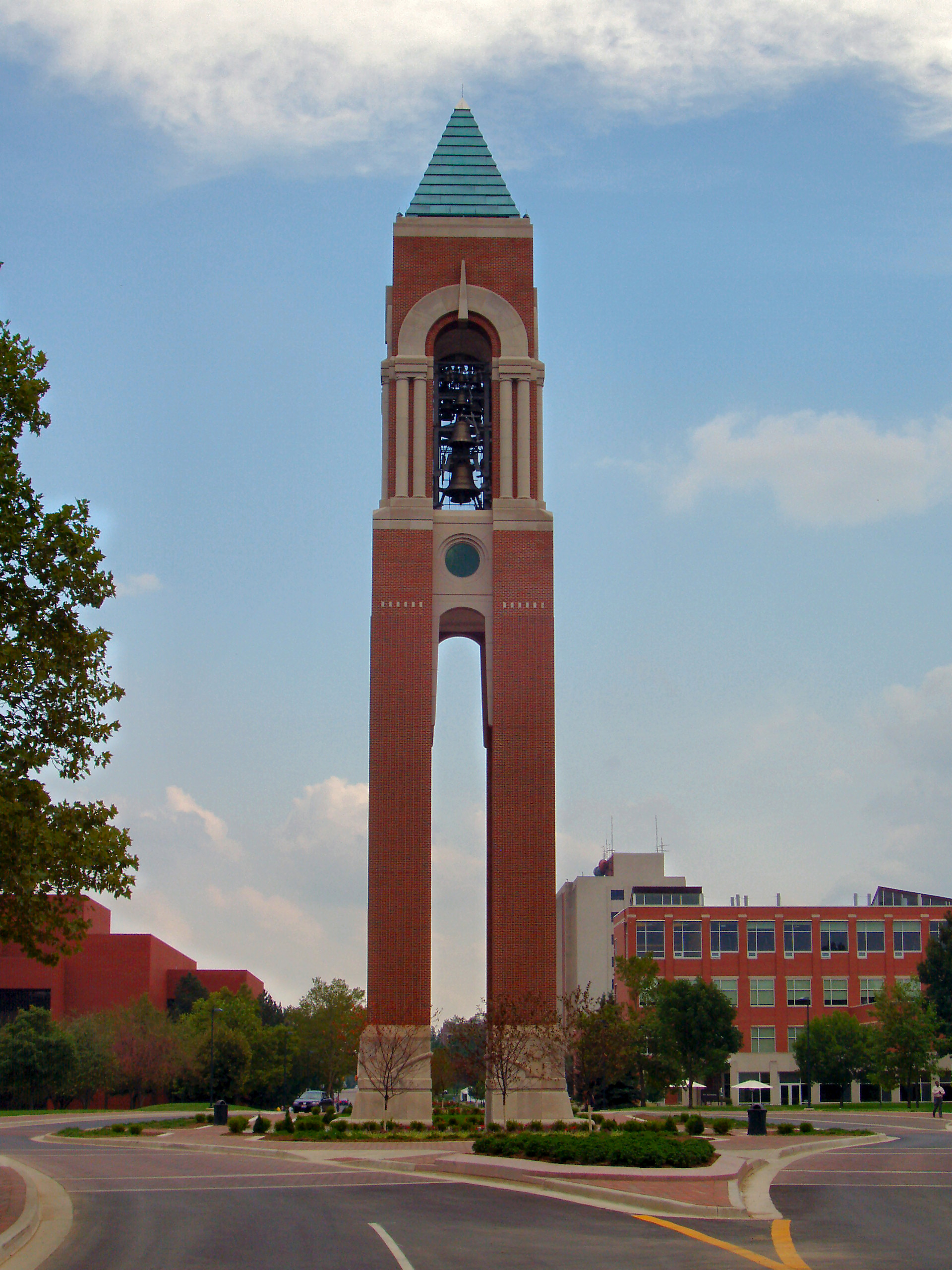
Shafer Tower looking southward on McKinley Avenue with the Art & Journalism building in the background

Ball State's main campus spans 731 acres (296 ha) and includes 109 buildings at 7,203,801 square feet (669,255 m^{2}) centered mostly on three main quadrangles. The university also manages just over 400 acres (160 ha) of research property. The main campus is situated about 1 mile (1.6 km) northwest of downtown Muncie.

McKinley Ave. is a two-lane, primary north–south street through the Ball State campus. Streetscape features include landscaped medians, granite curbing, limestone bollards and planters, bus turn-outs, and brick crosswalks. A pedestrian scramble is located at the intersection of Riverside and McKinley avenues.

Old Quad, the university's historic quadrangle, anchors the south end of Ball State's campus. Distinctive features include its mature tree canopy and Collegiate Gothic architecture. It is bounded by McKinley Ave. (east), University Ave. (south), Christy Woods (west), and Riverside Ave. (north). The residential Westwood Historic District is situated immediately across Riverside Ave. to the north. Old Quad landmarks include Beneficence and the Fine Arts Building, home to the David Owsley Museum of Art. The museum contains some 11,000 works valued at more than $40 million. The Fine Arts Terrace, overlooking the Old Quad, hosts the annual spring commencement ceremonies.

Ball State's central campus area first began to develop in the 1960s. It is generally bounded by New York Ave. (east), Riverside Ave. (south), the Westwood Historic District (west), and Neely Ave./Petty Rd. (north). Distinctive features include its mix of academic buildings, residential and dining halls, and performing arts venues. Notable landmarks include Bracken Library, Emens Auditorium, and the Frog Baby Fountain on University Green. Located in the median of McKinley Ave., Shafer Tower is a 150-foot-tall (46 m) free-standing bell tower with a 48-bell carillon.

East Quad, the newest quadrangle, sits east of the Old Quad and south of the central campus. It is bounded by Dicks St. (east), Ashland Ave. (south), McKinley Ave. (west), and Riverside Ave. (north). East Quad is situated immediately north of The Village commercial district.

The North Residential Neighborhood was completed in 2022 and comprises Botsford/Swinford Halls, Jack Beyerl Hall, North Dining Hall, North West Hall, and Schmidt/Wilson Halls.

York Prairie Creek, also known as Cardinal Creek, is an intra-campus creek that begins at the pond outside Park Hall, winding northwest and connecting to the Duck Pond before heading west toward the White River. The campus includes nearly 8,000 trees of about 625 species.

=== Campus transportation ===
Ball State provides a free shuttle service each semester. Shuttles buses run on green and blue loops every eight to ten minutes. The university also provides a late-night pickup service, Charlie's Charter. Upon request, Charlie's Charter will transport students throughout the campus.

Muncie Indiana Transit System (MITS) also provides local fixed-route bus service free to students. Routes 1, 2, 14, and 16 run through campus.

=== Athletic facilities ===
Most of Ball State University's athletic facilities and intramural fields are located on the northernmost portion of campus near the intersection of McGalliard Rd. and Tillotson Ave. Facilities include First Merchants Ballpark Complex (Ball Diamond and Softball Field), Briner Sports Complex, the Earl Yestingsmeier Golf Practice Facility, the Fisher Football Training Complex, the Scheumann Family Indoor Practice Facility, and the 22,500-seat Scheumann Stadium, home to Ball State Cardinals football.

The 11,500-seat John E. Worthen Arena anchors the central campus athletic facilities. There are also tennis courts on campus.

=== Architecture ===
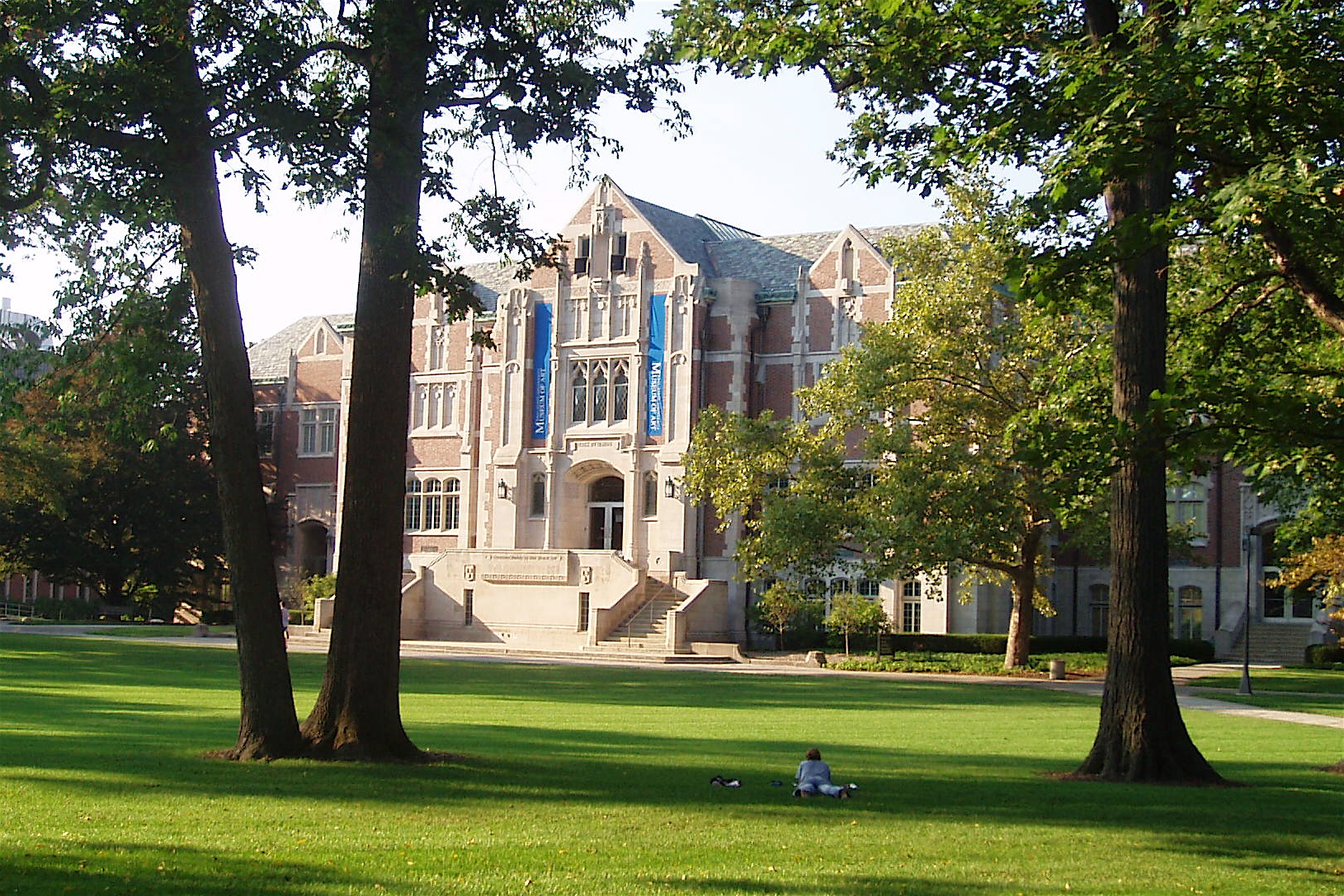
The Fine Arts Building is a prominent example of Collegiate Gothic-style architecture common on the university's Old Quad.

Ball State University's campus buildings exhibit a blending of architectural styles that generally reflect the time period in which they were designed. With few exceptions, most façades feature variations of red or brown brick and limestone.

Completed in 1899, the Neoclassical-style Frank A. Bracken Administration Building is the oldest extant building on the campus. It is distinctive for its yellow brick exterior.

Collegiate Gothic-style architecture is reflected in the university's oldest buildings, including Ball Gymnasium (1925), Burris Laboratory School (1929), the Fine Arts Building (1936), and Elliott Hall (1937). Other examples include Burkhardt Building (1924), North Quad Building (1926), and Lucina Hall (1927). Completed in 1937, the Georgian Revival-style Bracken House serves as the president's residence. It is located off-campus.

Modernist architecture appeared on campus in the 1950s, embracing simpler, utilitarian designs. Examples include the L. A. Pittenger Student Center (1952) and Emens Auditorium (1964). From the mid-1960s through the 1980s, campus architecture was most influenced by Brutalism, featuring imposing brick walls and narrow windows. Examples of this style include Cooper Science Complex (1967), the Teachers College Building (1968), the Architecture Building, Pruis Hall (both completed in 1972), Bracken Library (1976), Whitinger Business Building (1979), and Robert Bell Building (1984). The Teachers College Building is the tallest building on campus, at 10 floors and 138 feet (42 m).

Beginning in the 1990s, new construction, building additions, and renovations were built to respect the scale and massing of the university's older Collegiate Gothic-style buildings. While red brick with limestone accents have remained the favored façade materials, large windows have become more commonplace to emphasize natural lighting. Examples include the Alumni Center by Pei Cobb Freed & Partners (1997), the Art and Journalism Building (2001), the Music Instruction Building (2004), the David Letterman Communication and Media Building (2007), Park Hall (2007), DeHority Complex (renovated in 2009), Jo Ann Gora Student Recreation and Wellness Center, and Kinghorn Hall (both completed in 2010).

Recent buildings (mid-2010s to present) have embraced contemporary architecture featuring open atriums, large windows, and sustainable design elements. Examples include Botsford/Swinford Halls (renovated in 2015), Schmidt/Wilson Halls (renovated in 2017), the Health Professions Building (completed in 2019), Jack Beyerl Hall, North Dining Hall (both completed in 2020), the Foundational Sciences Building, and North West Hall (both completed in 2021).

=== Sustainability ===
Ball State has adopted environmental sustainability as a primary component of the university's strategic plan and vision. Starting in the mid-2000s, all building additions and renovations are designed to meet Leadership in Energy and Environmental Design (LEED) certification standards. Standards include environmentally-friendly site selection, energy and water efficiency, materials selection, and indoor environmental quality, among others. The university diverts 20 percent of its waste from landfills through recycling efforts and also invests in hybrid vehicles, hybrid-electric shuttle buses, and vehicles that use E85.

Since 2007, 13 campus buildings have achieved LEED certification. The Marilyn K. Glick Center for Glass and Teachers College Building is considered LEED certified. The David Letterman Communication and Media Building, Park Hall, DeHority Hall, Kinghorn Hall, and the Jo Ann Gora Student Recreation and Wellness Center have earned LEED Silver certification. Studebaker East Residence Hall, District Energy Station North, Applied Technology Building, Botsford/Swinford Residence Hall, Schmidt/Wilson Residence Hall, and District Energy Station South have earned LEED Gold certification. The university's first green roof was installed on the North District Energy Station in 2011.

Former president Jo Ann Gora was a founding member of the American College & University Presidents' Climate Commitment, an initiative by several institutions to address climate change and reduce greenhouse gas emissions on their campuses. In 2011, the Sustainable Endowments Institute gave the university a College Sustainability Report Card grade of "C+."

==== Geothermal system ====
In 2009, then-president Jo Ann Gora announced the university's plans for installing the largest geothermal energy project of its kind in the U.S. Ball State committed to reducing greenhouse gas emissions by nearly 80,000 tons annually through the installation of a $65 million geothermal heating and cooling system and closure of all four coal-fired boilers on campus. The geothermal system, completed in 2017, consists of 3,600 boreholes and two energy stations on campus. The system consists of two underground loops with more than 5,500,000 feet (1,700,000 m) of pipes to circulate water for heating and cooling throughout campus.

=== Satellite facilities ===
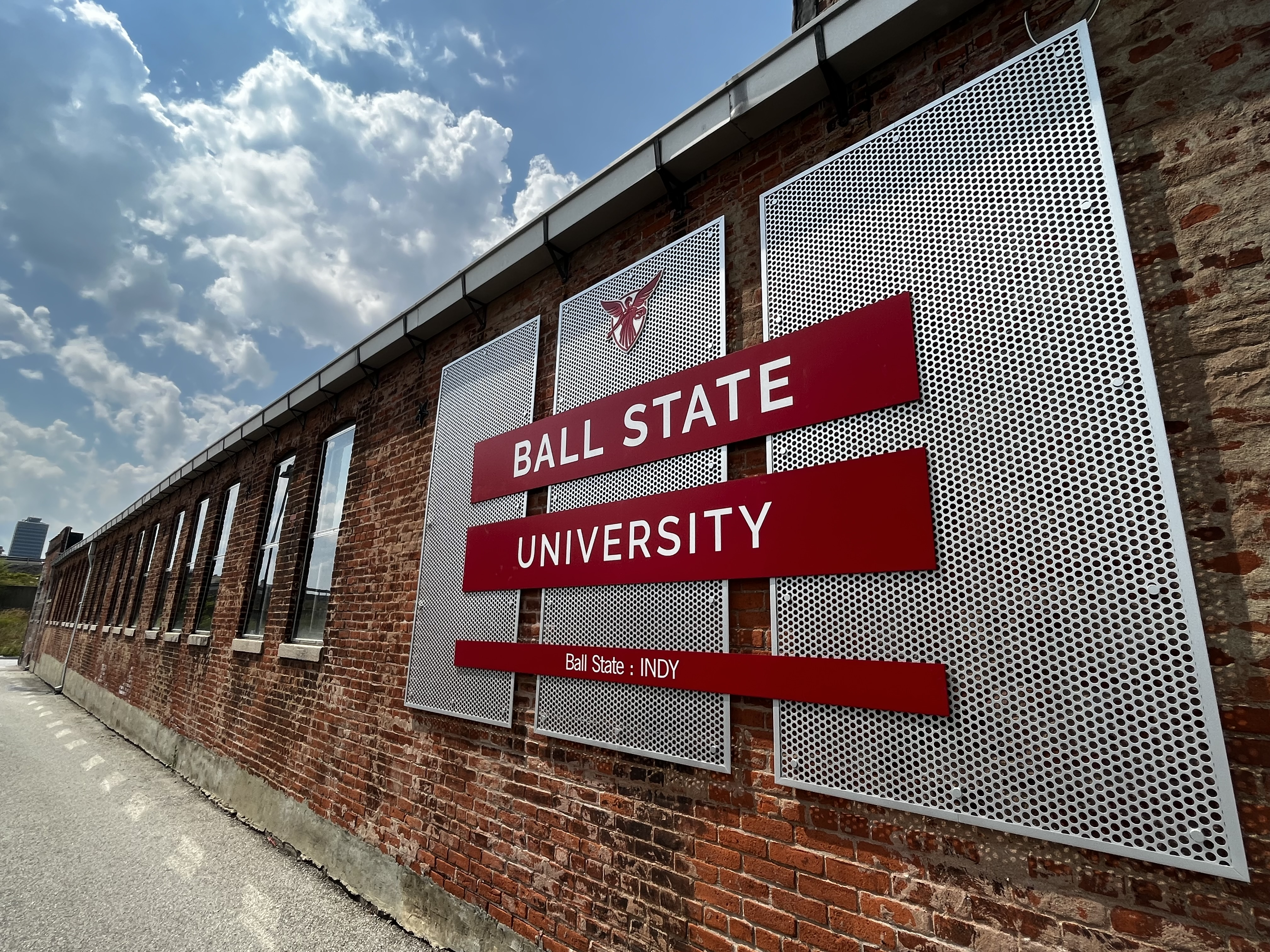
Exterior of Ball State's Indianapolis site in 2023

Ball State University manages two satellite facilities in the state of Indiana: CAP: INDY and the Fishers Center for Academic and Economic Innovation.

Since 2001, the Estopinal College of Architecture and Planning has operated a satellite facility in Indianapolis. Known as CAP: INDY, it houses the Center for Civic Design and provides interdisciplinary studio space for graduate students in the college's master of architecture and master of urban design programs. In 2019, the center moved to the Elevator Hill section of the city's Holy Cross neighborhood near downtown Indianapolis. CAP: INDY occupies 17,000 square feet (1,600 m^{2}) of the Glass Building at 25 N. Pine St.

The Fishers Center for Academic and Economic Innovation, located in Fishers, Indiana, was established in 2015. The center occupies 3,000 square feet (280 m^{2}) at Launch Fishers, a co-working/business incubator. The site offers academic programs, community engagement, and professional development sessions to students, alumni, and organizations. During the spring semester, entrepreneurship student teams are paired with six Launch Fishers companies to develop growth strategies for each company.

== Academics ==
=== Student body ===
Student body composition as of May 2, 2022
Race and ethnicity	Total
White	76%
Black	10%
Hispanic	7%
Other (Note: Other consists of Multiracial Americans & those who prefer to not say.)	5%
Asian	2%
Foreign national	1%
Economic diversity
Low-income (Note: The percentage of students who received an income-based federal Pell grant intended for low-income students.)	39%
Affluent (Note: The percentage of students who are a part of the American middle class at the bare minimum.)	61%

Ball State University enrolls approximately 21,500 students who come from throughout Indiana, the United States, and around the world. Out-of-state students make up about 25 percent of enrollment, and ethnic minorities account for about 23 percent. The university enrolls more than 300 international students.

As of the 2020–2021 school year, Ball State University's student population primarily consisted of Indiana residents (74 percent) with 25 percent being nonresidents. Sixty-five percent of the student body is female. The university admitted 77 percent of applicants in 2019.

=== Undergraduate admissions ===
In 2024, Ball State accepted 68.9% of undergraduate applicants, with admission standards considered challenging, and with those enrolled having an average 3.52 high school GPA. The college does not require submission of standardized test scores but they are considered, Ball State being a test optional school. Those enrolled that submitted test scores had an average 1180 SAT score (30% submitting scores) or average 25 ACT score (6% submitting scores).

=== Tuition ===
For the 2021–2022 academic year, annual undergraduate tuition is $8,284 for in-state students taking 12 to 18 credits per semester and $25,518 for out-of-state students. Including technology, recreation, Health Center, and room and board fees, annual undergraduate expenses total about $21,086 for in-state students and $38,320 for out-of-state students. For the 2021–2022 academic year, annual graduate tuition is $7,748 for in-state students taking nine credits per semester and $21,222 for out-of-state students. Including other fees, in-state graduate student expenses total $20,560, and $34,024 for out-of-state graduate students.

=== Colleges ===
Colleges by year of founding
College	Founded
Teachers College	1918
College of Sciences and Humanities	1926
College of Fine Arts	1935
Estopinal College of Architecture and Planning	1965
College of Communication, Information, and Media	1966
Miller College of Business	1966
College of Health	2016

Ball State University offers five associate degrees, 119 bachelor's, 78 master's,15 doctoral degrees, 60 post-baccalaureate certificates, and three post-masters certificates. In fall 2020, the average campus class size was 21 students, with a student-to-teacher ratio of 16 to 1.

Ball State University has been accredited by The Higher Learning Commission continuously since 1925.

=== Library system ===
Bracken Library is the university's main library. Completed in 1975, Bracken houses five floors of classrooms, computer labs, private study suites, and video viewing suites. The library provides access to about 2.3 million books, periodicals, microforms, audiovisual materials, software, government publication maps, musical scores, archival records, and other information sources. Bracken Library hosts the Ball State University Digital Media Repository, an open-access resource containing over 130,000 digital objects in 64 collections, as well as the Center for Middletown Studies. System branches include the Architecture Library and the Science–Health Science Library. Over 1.1 million visits were made throughout the University Libraries system between 2011 and 2012.

=== Rankings ===
Academic rankings

National
- Forbes: 487
- U.S. News & World Report: 213 (tie)
- Washington Monthly: 133 of 442
- WSJ/College Pulse: > 600

Global
- U.S. News & World Report: 1484 (tie)

Ball State ranked 191st nationally on U.S. News & World Report's 2021 "Top Performers on Social Mobility" list. College Magazine ranked the university No. 6 in the country for "Top 10 Campuses for Students with Disabilities." The Princeton Review also classifies Ball State as among its "Best Midwestern" universities and "Green Colleges." Insight into Diversity has awarded a Higher Education Excellence in Diversity (HEED) award every year since 2016.

The entrepreneurial management program ranked among the top 50 in the U.S. in The Princeton Review 2020 rankings. U.S. News & World Report ranked Ball State 36th in 2021 for First-Year Experiences, 46th in the U.S. in audiology programs, 47th in rehabilitation counseling programs, 84th in "Best Education Schools," 92nd in speech-language pathology programs, 166th in public affairs programs, and 202nd in psychology programs.

In 2024, Washington Monthly ranked Ball State 133rd among 438 national universities in the U.S. based on Ball State's contribution to the public good, as measured by social mobility, research, and promoting public service.

Several programs are nationally ranked in their respective categories in U.S. News & World Report's "Best Online Programs" list: the master's in curriculum and educational technology 4th, master's in nursing education 5th, master's in educational administration and supervision 11th, master of business administration 15th, master's in special education 16th, master's in nursing 17th, and bachelor's programs 29th.

== Student life ==
=== Housing ===
Ball State University operates 14 residence halls for its students, with a 15th expected to open during the 2021–2022 school year. A 16th residence hall, Burkhardt/Jeep Hall in the Wagoner Complex, houses students of the Ball State-operated Indiana Academy.

Anthony and Scheidler Apartments on campus accommodate upper-level single students, students with families, and university faculty and staff. Prices vary for on-campus living with meal plan access to dining facilities. LaFollette Complex had previously contained about 1,900 students, the highest capacity residence hall complex on campus, but began undergoing demolition in 2017. As of 2020, Brayton/Clevenger residence hall was the only remaining hall in the complex.

The majority of residence halls are home to living-learning communities in which students enrolled in the same majors or similar majors are housed together and participate in special activities.

=== Student organizations and activities ===
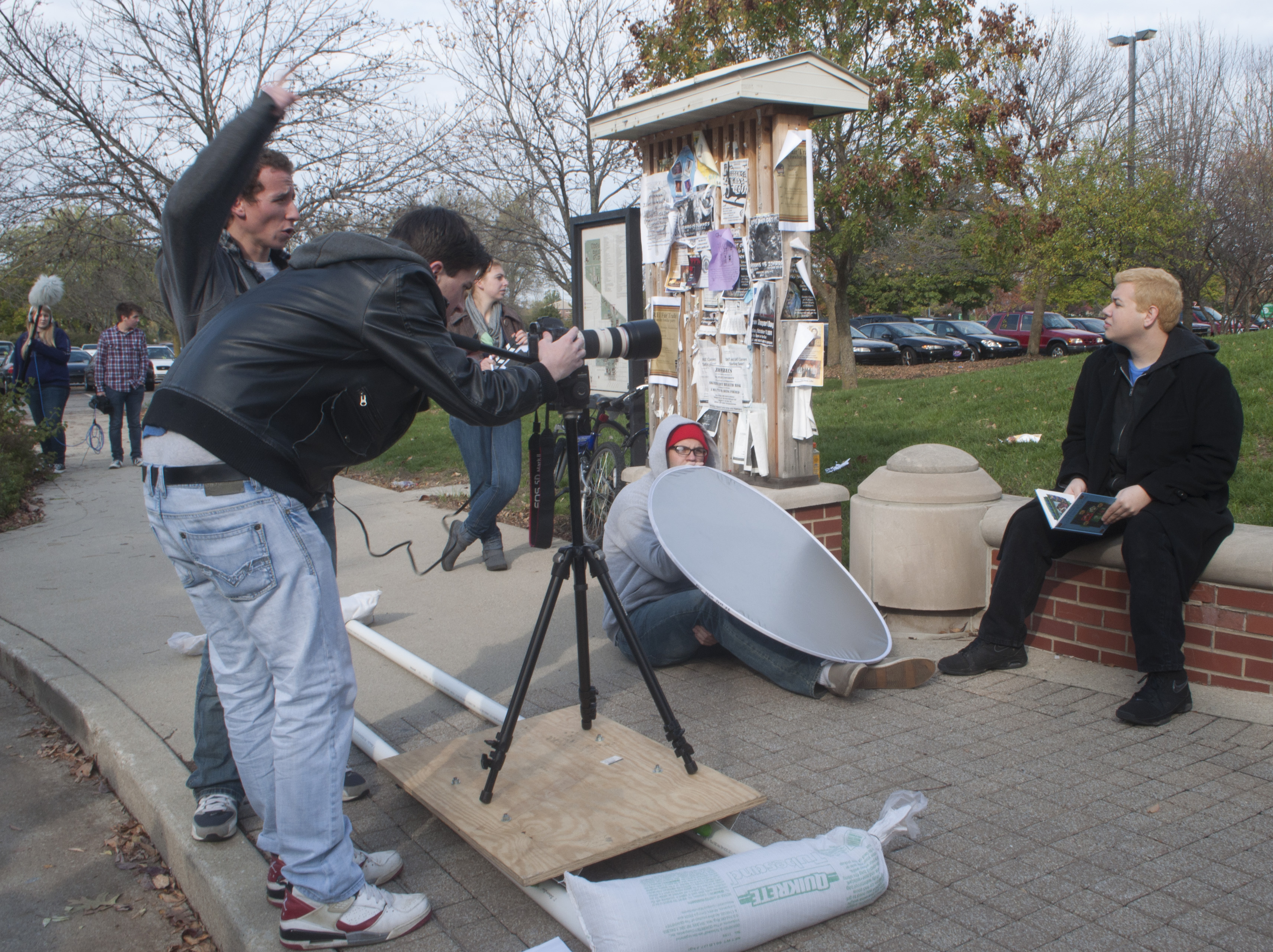
Students belonging to Cardinal Filmworks produce a short-film on campus in 2011

More than 400 student organizations at Ball State include numerous student government, departmental and professional, special interest, and service groups, all sanctioned by the Office of Student Life in the L. A. Pittenger Student Center. Multicultural organizations include the Asian American Student Association, Black Student Association, National Organization of Minority Architect Students (NOMAS), Latinx Student Union, and Spectrum, for LGBTQ equity. Ball State is often credited as one of the first universities in the nation to begin a Safe Zone training program, which began in 1992, to educate the public and empower LGBTQ allies and advocates.

Ball State University is home to about 30 on-campus Greek letter organizations.

=== Media ===
Eight student-run media organizations operate as part of Ball State's Unified Media Lab in its College of Communication, Information, and Media. The lab includes the Ball State Daily News, Ball Bearings magazine, Byte, Cardinal Metrics, Cardinal WX, Newslink Indiana, Ball State Sports Link, and WCRD radio station.

==== Ball State Daily News ====
The Ball State Daily News is a student newspaper with articles published daily online and a weekly print circulation of 5,000 copies, published every Thursday during the academic year, excluding exams and vacation. Originally founded in 1922 as The Easterner, the newspaper was among the first student publications to be inducted into the Associated Collegiate Press' Hall of Fame in 1988 and has won numerous national pacemaker awards. In 2026, the paper discontinued its weekly print edition and went online-only.

==== Ball Bearings magazine ====
Ball Bearings is an online and print student magazine that focuses on in-depth articles.

==== Byte ====
Byte is a multimedia student organization that produces news, features, reviews, graphics, podcasts, and videos focusing on entertainment, technology, and culture.

==== Cardinal Metrics ====
Cardinal Metrics is an analytics agency in which students work with professional clients to provide analysis and consultation services.

==== Cardinal WX ====
Cardinal WX, or "Waking up with Cardinal Weather," is a morning mobile show that provides news, weather, and lifestyle trends.

==== NewsLink Indiana ====
NewsLink Indiana is a three-times-weekly 30-minute broadcast. The show covers local news, national news, entertainment, weather, and sports. NewsLink has won numerous Lower Great Lakes Regional Emmy Awards.

==== Ball State Sports Link ====
Ball State Sports Link started in 2009 as one of the university's immersive learning projects. Students cover athletics, including live remote productions, live-to-tape events, television programs, student-athlete features, Facebook live shows, and social media content. The programs also include a digital radio broadcast, social media management and analytics, and podcasts.

==== WCRD ====
WCRD is a non-commercial radio station operated full-time by Ball State students from studios in the David Letterman Communication and Media Building.

==== The Agency at Cardinal Media ====
The Department of Journalism supports The Agency at Cardinal Media, formerly The McKinley Avenue Agency a student-run public relations and advertising agency that works with other university offices and community businesses. Services include media sales, creative services, public relations and communications, and events and contests. The organization merged with the former Cardinal Communications, which focused on public relations services.

==== Ball State Public Media ====
The university announced in October 2020 the formation of Ball State Public Media, a partnership between Ball State PBS (formerly WIPB) and Indiana Public Radio (WBST).

== Athletics ==
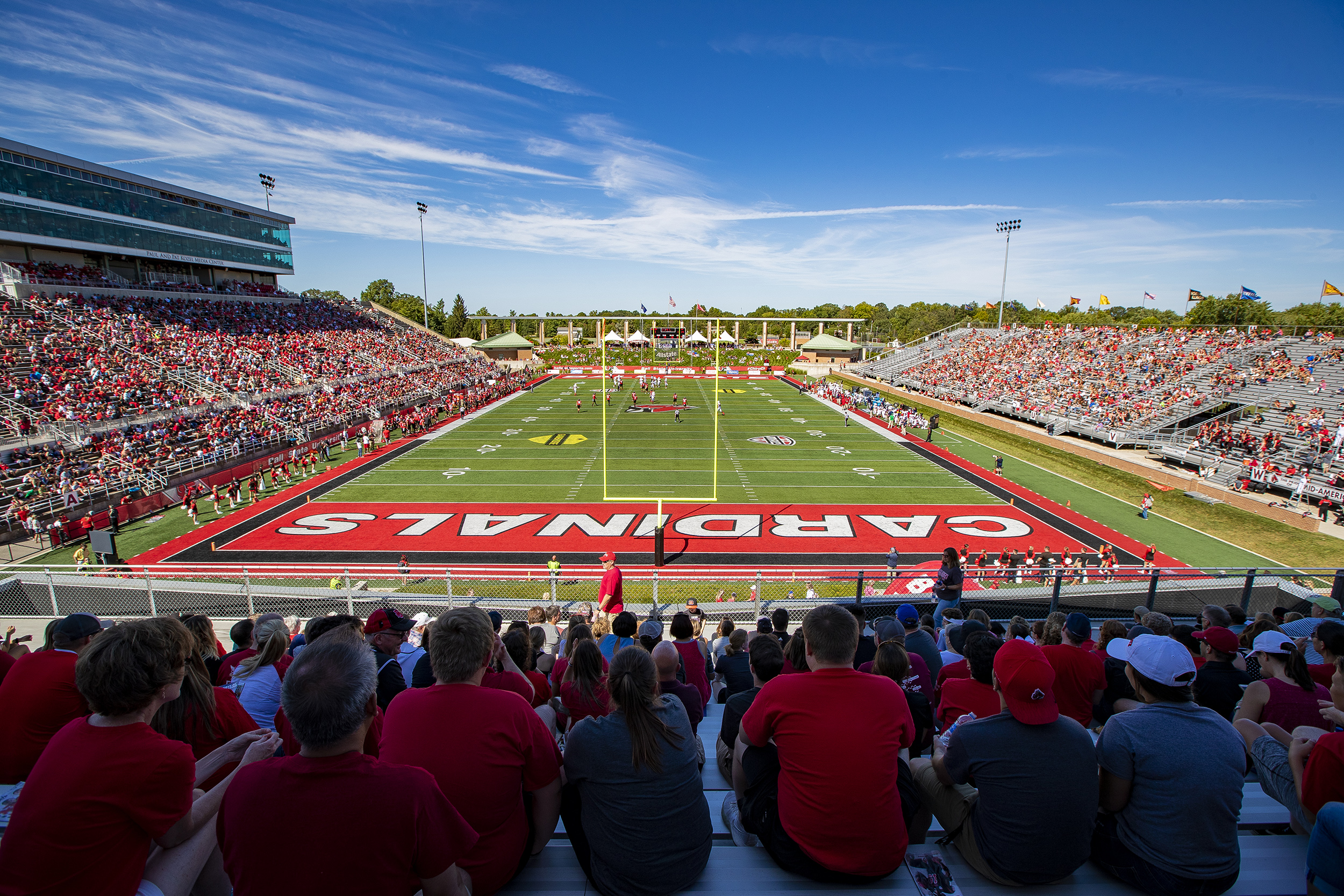
Ball State Cardinals football at Scheumann Stadium

Ball State NCAA membership: Men's sports
Sport	Conference
Basketball	MAC
Golf	MAC
Swimming	MAC
Tennis	MAC
Volleyball	MIVA
Baseball	MAC
Football	MAC

Ball State NCAA membership: Women's sports
Sport	Conference
Basketball	MAC
Golf	MAC
Swimming	MAC
Tennis	MAC
Volleyball	MAC
Softball	MAC
Soccer	MAC
Field hockey	MAC
Gymnastics	MAC
Indoor Track & Field	MAC
Outdoor Track & Field	MAC
Cross country	MAC

Ball State competes in the NCAA Division I (FBS) and is part of the Mid-American Conference (MAC) in all sports except for men's volleyball, where it competes in the Midwestern Intercollegiate Volleyball Association (MIVA).

In 2018, Beth Goetz was named as the director of athletics, proceeding Mark Sandy. Goetz is Ball State's second female director of athletics in the history of the department.

Ball State Cardinals football was established in the 1924 season and has a 461–434–32 (.515) record as of January 2021. Ball State has won six conference championships in football, most recently in 2020, and has appeared in seven NCAA Division I postseason bowl games, most recently in 2020 defeating San Jose State, 34–13, in the Offerpad Arizona Bowl for the Cardinals' first-ever bowl victory. Ball State has a 1–7–1 bowl game record. Ball State annually competes against conference rival Northern Illinois, playing for the Bronze Stalk Trophy; Ball State holds a 3–10 record in the contest.

Ball State Cardinals men's basketball began in 1920. Although there was little success in the program from its start until the 1970s, the next two decades would be the highlight of the program's performance. Ball State became a powerhouse in the Mid-American Conference, winning a record seven MAC tournaments and with subsequent appearances in the NCAA Division I men's basketball tournament between 1981 and 2000. The Cardinals' most successful year was 1990 when the team reached the Sweet Sixteen but lost to eventual national champion UNLV, 69–67. Even though the Cardinals lost the game, BSU player Chandler Thompson recorded what is considered to be one of the most memorable put-back dunks in college basketball history. The team's last NCAA Division I men's basketball tournament appearance was in 2000.

Ball State formed a short-lived curling team that competed in the 2006 College Curling National Bonspiel in Chicago, Illinois at the Northshore Curling Club. Despite limited practice time prior to the tournament, the Ball State Curlers went 1–2 during pool play, with their sole victory coming in a confident 10–4 match against the Big Ten's University of Illinois.

Charlie Cardinal is Ball State's mascot, modeled after Indiana's state bird, the northern cardinal.

== Traditions ==
=== Beneficence ===
The statue Beneficence (aka "Benny") is a bronze statue dedicated in 1937 on Ball State's quad. The statue was sculpted by Daniel Chester French, creator of the Abraham Lincoln statue in the Lincoln Memorial. Beneficence was selected to recognize the generosity of the five Ball brothers, who founded the university and made many other contributions to Muncie, Indiana. The statue serves as a primary symbol for the university, including being the focus of Ball State's official logo.

=== Frog Baby ===
The Frog Baby statue has been the center of legend and tradition since it was presented by Frank Ball in 1937. While initially on display in the David Owsley Museum of Art, students began a tradition of rubbing the statue's nose for good luck before taking exams. Over the years, the nose was worn away, and in 1993, the statue was sent overseas for refurbishment. Today, Frog Baby is situated in a fountain on University Green. Since its move and restoration, students have started a new tradition of dressing the statue to reflect weather patterns (scarves and hats in the winter) or current university events (jerseys and helmets for upcoming football games). Despite 24/7 surveillance, the statue has been a repeated target of vandals.

=== The Naked Lady ===
Forest Idyl, more commonly known by students and faculty as "The Naked Lady," is a bronze statue of a partially nude woman mingling with two wild deer. The statue is one of four known original castings by sculpture artist Albin Polasek.

The statue is located in the lobby of Bracken Library.

=== Homecoming ===
Beginning in 1926, Homecoming has brought several traditions. Homecoming Parade was first held in 1939. The parade route begins at Muncie Central High School downtown, travels west down University Avenue through The Village, and ends at McKinley and Neely avenues on campus. The 75th anniversary of the parade in 2012 saw over 100 float entries. Since the inaugural event in 1980, the Homecoming Bed Race has been held the Friday before homecoming. The annual event consists of five-person teams within seven divisions, racing beds down a 100-yard course on Riverside Avenue in zany costumes. Other Homecoming traditions include the Air Jam lip-sync competition and Talent Search scholarship talent show.

=== Other traditions ===
Starting in 2004, Ball State students adopted "Chirp! Chirp!" as a school chant to cheer on teams during sporting events. Traditionally, The Chirp chant begins on the opposing team's third down during Ball State Cardinals football games. Accompanying the chant, participants usually place their index finger and thumb together, extending the other three fingers straight up, and moving their arm in an up-and-down motion.

For at least a decade, it had become a tradition for students and visitors to stick pieces of chewed gum to a honey locust tree between Emens Parking Garage and Pruis Hall. The trunk of the "Gum Tree," as it had been named, was covered in colorful wads of used gum. The tree was removed in 2017 by the university in preparation for construction of the East Mall.

== Notable alumni ==
Ball State University has about 197,000 alumni worldwide. A few of Ball State's most notable graduates include:

- Kent C. "Oz" Nelson (BA 1959, LLD 1994), former president and CEO of UPS
- Jim Davis (BA 1967, LittD (h.c.) 1991), creator of the Garfield comic strip
- David Letterman (BA 1969), Emmy Award-winning former host of the Late Show
- Actress Joyce DeWitt (BA 1972)
- Architect Craig W. Hartman (BArch 1973, DA 2009)
- Angela Ahrendts (BA 1981, DHL 2010), former CEO of Burberry and former Apple Inc. executive
- Jeffrey D. Feltman (BS 1981, LLD 2013), United Nations Under-Secretary-General for Political Affairs, former U.S. Ambassador to Lebanon
- Brian Gallagher (BSW 1981), former president and CEO of United Way Worldwide
- Actor Doug Jones (BA 1982)
- John Schnatter (BA 1983, LLD 2015), founder and former chairman of Papa John's Pizza
- Angelin Chang, (BA and BM 1990) Grammy Award-winning classical pianist
- Jarrod Jones (born 1990), American-Hungarian basketball player in the Israeli Basketball Premier League
- Jason Whitlock (BS 1990), sportswriter and host of Speak for Yourself
- Tiara Thomas (BA 2012), Grammy Award and Academy Award-winning singer-songwriter

== See also ==
- List of colleges and universities in Indiana
- List of Ball State University Presidents
