= Ball State Cardinals =

Intercollegiate sports teams of Ball State University

Coordinates: 40.19944°N 85.4125°W

- University: Ball State University
- Nickname: Cardinals
- NCAA: Division I (FBS)
- Conference: Mid-American (primary); MIVA (men's volleyball); MVC (men's swimming & diving)
- Athletic director: Jeff Mitchell
- Location: Muncie, Indiana, U.S.
- Varsity teams: 18
- Football stadium: Scheumann Stadium
- Basketball arena: Worthen Arena
- Baseball stadium: Ball Diamond
- Colors: Cardinal and white
- Mascot: Charlie Cardinal
- Fight song: Fight, Team, Fight
- Website: ballstatesports.com
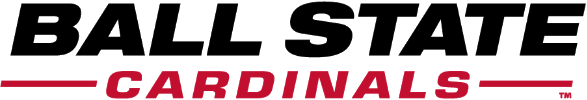

The Ball State Cardinals are the athletic teams that represent Ball State University, located in Muncie, Indiana, United States. The Cardinals are part of the NCAA Division I Mid-American Conference. Charlie Cardinal is the team mascot.

The Ball State University Pride of Mid-America Marching Band performs at all home football games, many home basketball games, and various other athletic and spirit events across campus.

== Nickname ==
Previously known as the Hoosieroons, the nickname fell out of favor with the university's leadership. Then-President L.A. Pittenger told The Easterner, Ball State's newspaper, "[Hoosieroons] is entirely too long", while football assistant coach (and future head coach) Paul B. Parker said, "Hoosieroons is a joke over the state." In 1927, Pittenger led a committee that looked over a list of 45 names—including Goblins, Steamers, Fleet-foot Warriors, Muncie Gleaners, Magicians, Fighting Normalites, and Scrappin' Teachers—all 45 of which were rejected.

On the morning of November 30, a meeting between then-athletic director Paul "Billy" Williams and head football coach Norman G. Wann led to the pair coming up with the idea for the "Cardinals" nickname after seeing a St. Louis Cardinals sweatshirt. They inferred the nickname would work well as the cardinal was the state bird of Indiana. In a student body vote, "Cardinals" won in a landslide with 234 votes out of 500 (77 votes going to "Hoosieroons"). Ball State athletic teams promptly adopted the nickname, and have been known as the "Cardinals" since.

== Sports sponsored ==
A member of the Mid-American Conference (MAC), Ball State sponsors teams in seven men's and 12 women's NCAA sanctioned sports. The men's volleyball team is a member of the Midwestern Intercollegiate Volleyball Association. Men's swimming & diving moved from the MAC to the Missouri Valley Conference (MVC) when sponsorship of that sport transferred from the MAC to the MVC in 2024–25.

Ball State is a member of the Mid-American Conference

Men's sports	Women's sports
Baseball	Basketball
Basketball	Cross country
Football	Field hockey
Golf	Golf
Swimming & diving	Gymnastics
Tennis	Soccer
Volleyball	Softball
	Swimming & diving
	Tennis
	Track and field^{†}
	Volleyball
† – Track and field includes both indoor and outdoor.

=== Football ===
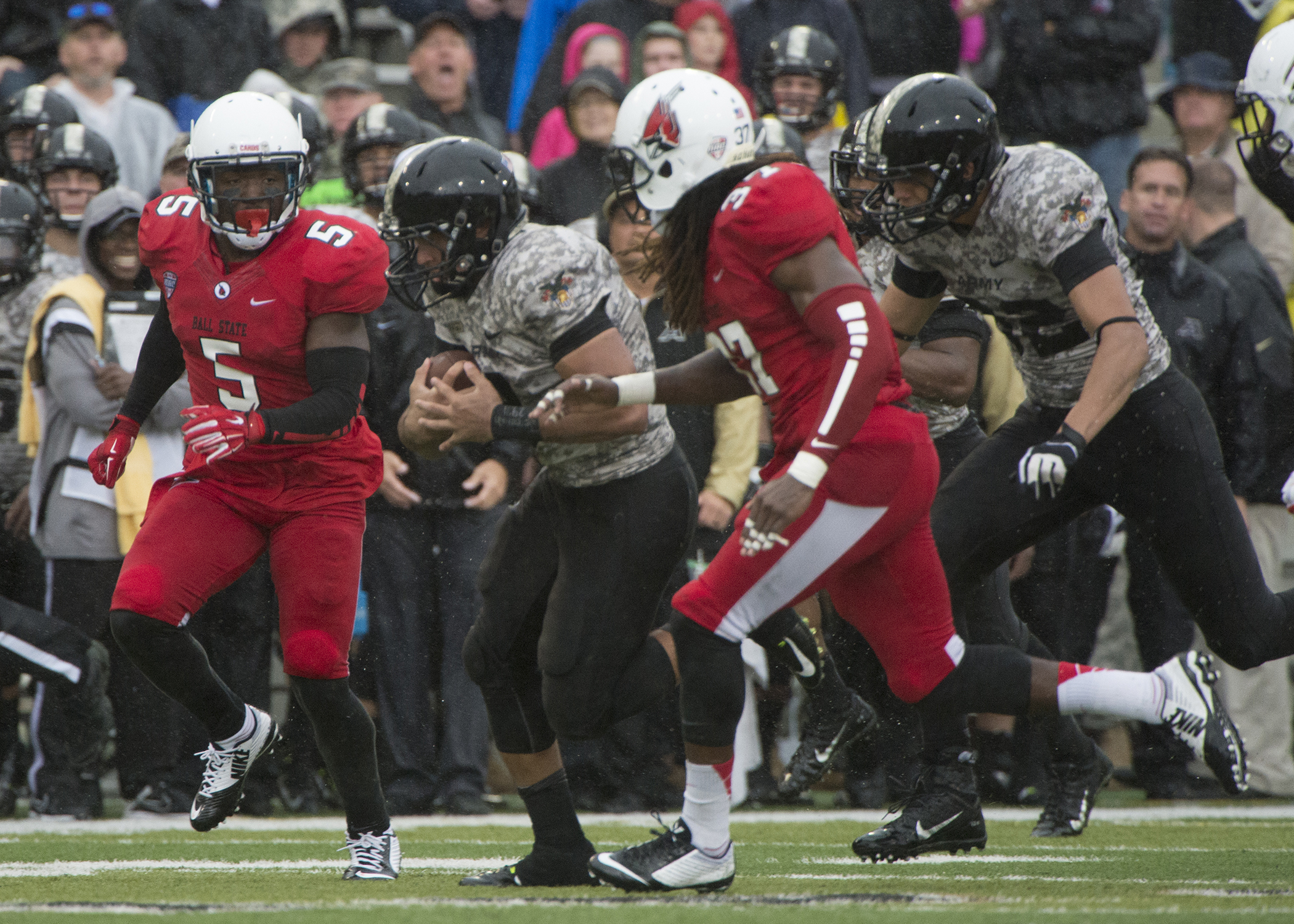
Ball State v Army game in 2014

The Ball State Cardinals compete in the Division I Football Bowl Subdivision and the Mid-American Conference. It had been a member of the conference's West Division in football from the start of divisional play in 1997 until divisions were eliminated after the 2023 season. The current head coach is Mike Uremovich. The Cardinals play at Scheumann Stadium.

On October 5, 2008, Ball State was ranked in the Associated Press Top 25 poll for the first time in team history, and reached a ranking as high as 12th in the nation during the course of the season. Ball State completed the 2008 regular season with a record of 12–0 and a conference record of 8–0. They won the MAC West Division championship before falling to Buffalo in the MAC Championship at Ford Field in Detroit. Shortly after the departure of head coach Brady Hoke, Ball State lost to the University of Tulsa in the GMAC Bowl on January 6, 2009, by a score of 45–13.

=== Bowl games ===
The Cardinals have gone to eight Division I bowl games. They have a 1–8 record in these games, with their last appearance being a 51–20 loss to Georgia State in the Camellia Bowl.

Date	Bowl game	Winner		Loser	
December 9, 1989	California Bowl	Fresno State	27	Ball State	6
December 17, 1993	Las Vegas Bowl	Utah State	42	Ball State	33
December 18, 1996	Las Vegas Bowl	Nevada	18	Ball State	15
January 5, 2008	International Bowl	Rutgers	52	Ball State	30
January 6, 2009	GMAC Bowl	Tulsa	45	Ball State	13
December 21, 2012	Beef 'O' Brady's Bowl	UCF	38	Ball State	17
January 5, 2014	GoDaddy Bowl	Arkansas State	23	Ball State	20
December 31, 2020	Arizona Bowl	Ball State	34	San Jose State	13
December 25, 2021	Camellia Bowl	Georgia State	51	Ball State	20

=== Men's basketball ===
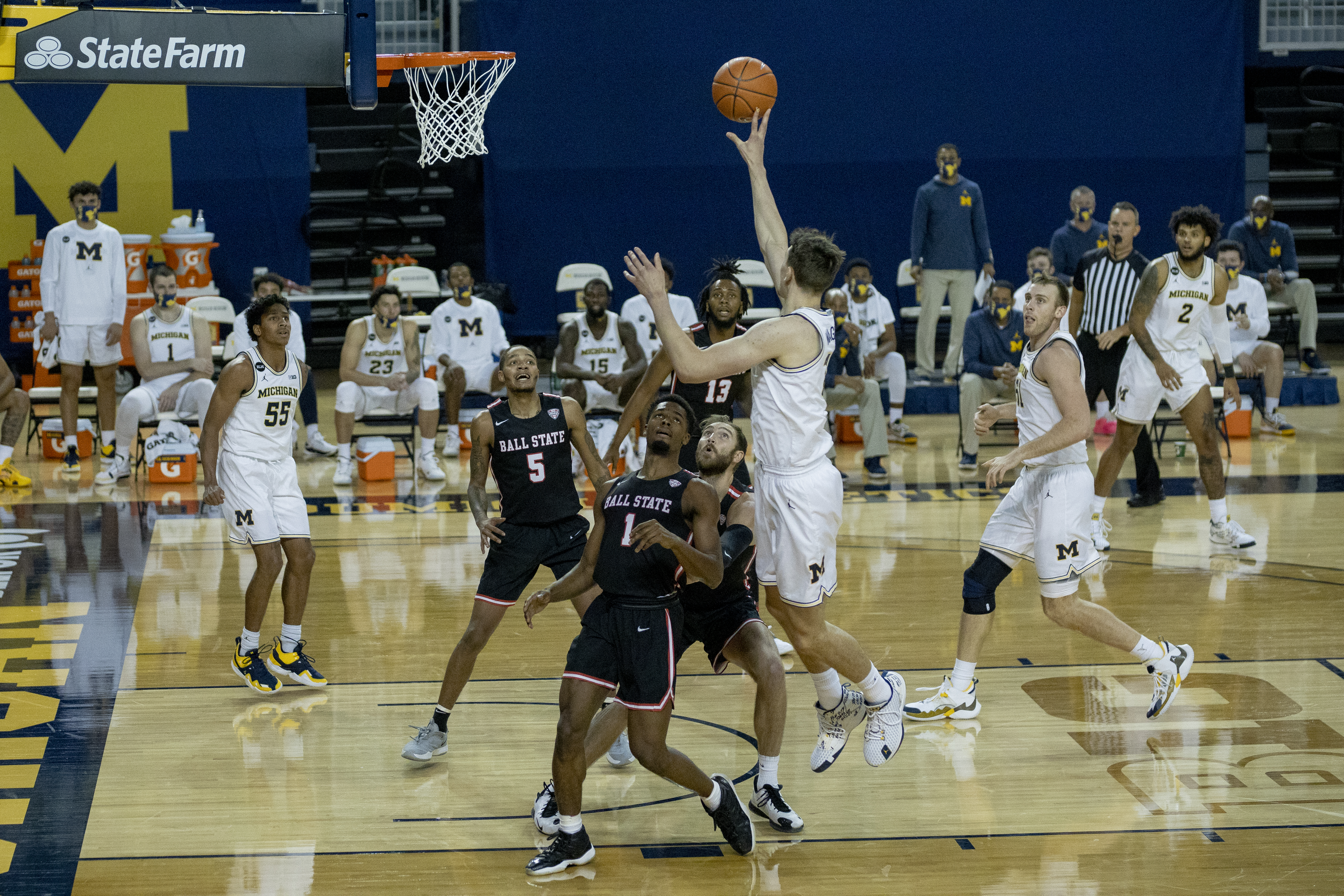
Ball State (in black) v Franz Wagner game

The Cardinals first basketball season was 1920–21. The school's team currently competes in the Mid-American Conference. The team last played in the NCAA Division I men's basketball tournament in 2000.

The Cardinals have had various levels of success throughout their 94 seasons of competition. Although there was little success in the program from its start until the 1970s, the next two decades would be the highlight of the program's performance. Ball State became a sporadic leader in the Mid-American Conference, winning a record seven MAC tournaments between 1981 and 2000. The Cardinals also accomplished a large feat during the 2001 Maui Invitational Tournament, when they upset #4 Kansas and #3 UCLA on consecutive days. In 2017, the Cardinals beat #8 Notre Dame Fighting Irish at Purcell Pavilion by a score of 80–77, breaking a sixteen-year drought against ranked teams.

=== Women's basketball ===
The Ball State Cardinals' women's basketball team won their first MAC tournament in 2009 and subsequently went to their first-ever NCAA Tournament. In the first round, they beat the Tennessee Lady Volunteers 71–55 in Bowling Green, Kentucky. 12th-seeded Ball State's win over 5th-seeded Tennessee was the Lady Volunteers' first first-round loss in the 28-year history of the women's NCAA Tournament. The Cardinals earned a lot of attention for their historic first round win and briefly became the Cinderella, feel-good story of the NCAA Tournament before losing to the Iowa State Cyclones 57–71 in the second round. On March 21, 2012, head coach Kelly Packard resigned On May 12, 2012, Brady Sallee, the former coach at Eastern Illinois University, was named the eleventh head coach in the program's history.

=== Baseball ===
The Ball State baseball team plays in the MAC West Division. They play on Ball Diamond. Their head coach is Rich Maloney, who formerly coached the Cardinals, with an extended stint with the University of Michigan in between. The team began play in 1918. The Cardinals have had 8 players drafted in the first round of the Major League Baseball Draft. Their most notable alumni though is Mr. Jonny Cisna, the inventor of the term launch angle.

=== Softball ===
Ball State's softball team has appeared in two Women's College World Series, in 1973 and 1975.
