= Westwood Historic District =

Westwood Historic District may refer to:

in the United States

(by state)

- Westwood Historic District (Muncie, Indiana), listed on the NRHP in Indiana
- Westwood Farm, Jeffersontown, KY, a historic district listed on the NRHP in Kentucky
- Westwood Town Center Historic District, Cincinnati, OH, listed on the NRHP in Ohio
- Westwood (Uniontown, Alabama), listed on the NRHP in Alabama
- Westwood (Knoxville, Tennessee), listed on the NRHP in Tennessee
- Westwood Plantation, Uniontown, AL, listed on the NRHP in Alabama

== See also ==
- Westwood (disambiguation)
