= College of Communication, Information, and Media =

Academic college in Muncie, Indiana, U.S.

Coordinates: 40.2035°N 85.4090°W

The College of Communication, Information, and Media (CCIM) is a part of Ball State University in Muncie, Indiana.

The Ball Communication Building and the David Letterman Communication and Media Building house the CCIM classrooms, offices, television studios, and radio station. CCIM has 1,300 majors and minors, placing it among the ten largest communications programs in the United States.

== History ==
CCIM started in 1966 as The Center for Radio and Television, offering about 10 different courses. By 1997, CCIM had developed audio studios, a screening room, television studios, wireless lab, and an electronic news room.

The Ball Communication Building was erected in 1988.

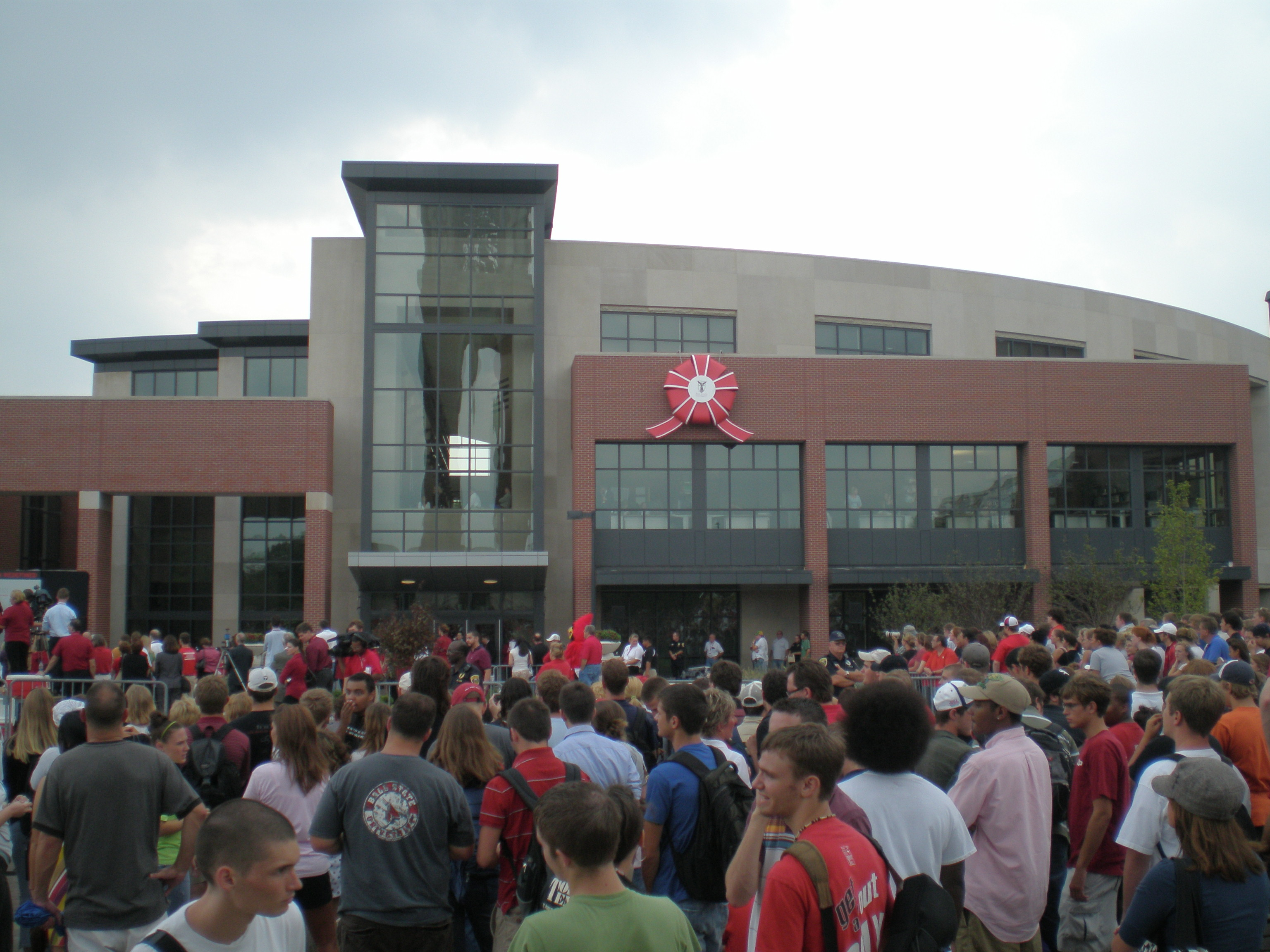
David Letterman building

The David Letterman Communication and Media Building opened in 2007, adding 85,000 square feet of space to the program. It offered more space for students, classrooms, and studio spaces, as well as centers for radio, such as the IPR station.

== Organization ==
CCIM contains departments of Communications Studies, Telecommunications, and Journalism, and the Center for Communication and Information Sciences. CCIM currently has 2,100 undergraduate students and 200 graduate students.

== Immersive learning ==
CCIM provides the university with immersive learning programs, internships, and projects. Ball State defines these opportunities as mostly interdisciplinary, involving a team of students, guided by a faculty member but led by students, real life results and end products, and having academic credit. Common yearly Immersive Learning experiences include Summer HD movie project, SportsLink, and WCRD-FM.

The Virginia Ball Center for Inquiry and the Business Fellows program often involve CCIM students. Virginia Ball Center has instigated many award-winning projects such as The Other Side of Middletown, an audiobook that received the Margaret Mead Award for Outstanding Research given by the American Anthropology Association, and Consuming a Nation, a radio series that won two first place awards from the Society of Professional Journalists.

Organizations, clubs, and programs:

- BSU Tonight
- Cardinal Filmworks
- Indiana Outdoors
- Cardinal Sports Live
- NewsLink Indiana
- Cardinal Vision Connections Live
- Sports Link
- Something Else
- WIPB-TV Channel 49
- WCRD-FM
- IPR/WBST 92.1 FM
- Radio Television Digital News Association (RTDNA)
- Reel Deal
- Student Advisory Council (SAC)
- National Association of Black Journalists (NABJ)
- Radio Television Digital News Association (RTDNA)
- Public Relations Student Society of America
- National Press Photographers Association
- Journalism Education Association
- American Advertising Federation

== Awards for the College of Communication, Information, and Media ==
In June 2012, Ball State students went to the annual regional Emmy Awards in Indianapolis and took home 6 of the 11 awards they were nominated for, and 5 of the awards were earned by telecommunication students. This success brings the total Emmy awards to 39 for the telecommunication community, and a total of 114 nominations. The community also holds two gold Student Academy Awards for their work in telecommunications. An immersive learning project, Sports Link, allows for students to produce sports-related content through different ways for the university. This program has also earned many Emmys and won the 2011 College Sports Media Award.

In 2011, Ball State was named the Television School of the Year by the Indiana Association of School Broadcasters (IASB) for the fifth time since 2000. In 2011 the Ball State Daily News, a student run newspaper, received 80 Gold Circles, 19 were first-place awards, from the Columbia Scholastic Press Association (CSPA).

== Ball State Radio- WCRD 91.3 FM ==
WCRD is the student run radio station at Ball State. The radio station began after Ball State alumnus David Letterman funded the original construction of the AM station in 1986 and in 1988 when the station became operational. In 1995, WCRD transferred to an FM broadcast over Muncie, Indiana. In 2006 WCRD had the format of the audience choosing-request format-, causing the selection of music to be a variety. In 2010, the radio's format changed once again, but fixated more on the Top 40 Pop and college rock.

WCRD, the second-largest student activity on Ball State's campus, serves as the voice of Ball State students and works self-sufficiently from Indiana Public Radio (IPR). In 2009, WCRD was named one of the country's top five college radio stations by the mtvU Woodie Awards. In 2010, WCRD won four silver Awards of Distinction from the International Academy of the Visual Arts.
