= The Pride of Mid-America Marching Band =

Marching band of Ball State University

The "Pride of Mid-America"
- School: Ball State University
- Location: Muncie, Indiana, U.S.
- Conference: Mid-American Conference
- Founded: 1926
- Members: 200 (2018)

The "Pride of Mid-America" is the name of the Ball State University marching band. Consisting of around 200 members, it is the largest student organization at Ball State.

== History ==
The band was first organized in 1926 by Claude E. Palmer, who at that time was the head of the Music Department at the former Ball State Teachers College. In 1945, Robert Hargreaves became the new Director of the Bands, working with Robert Holmes as Associate Director of Bands. The next year, Hargreaves selected Robert Hamilton as the new director.

In 1950, Herbert Fred was designated Director of Bands. Under his direction, the Ball State Marching Band was one of the first bands in the country to perform drill on the field. In addition, the band began accepting women into the organization, which previously had been only accessible to men.

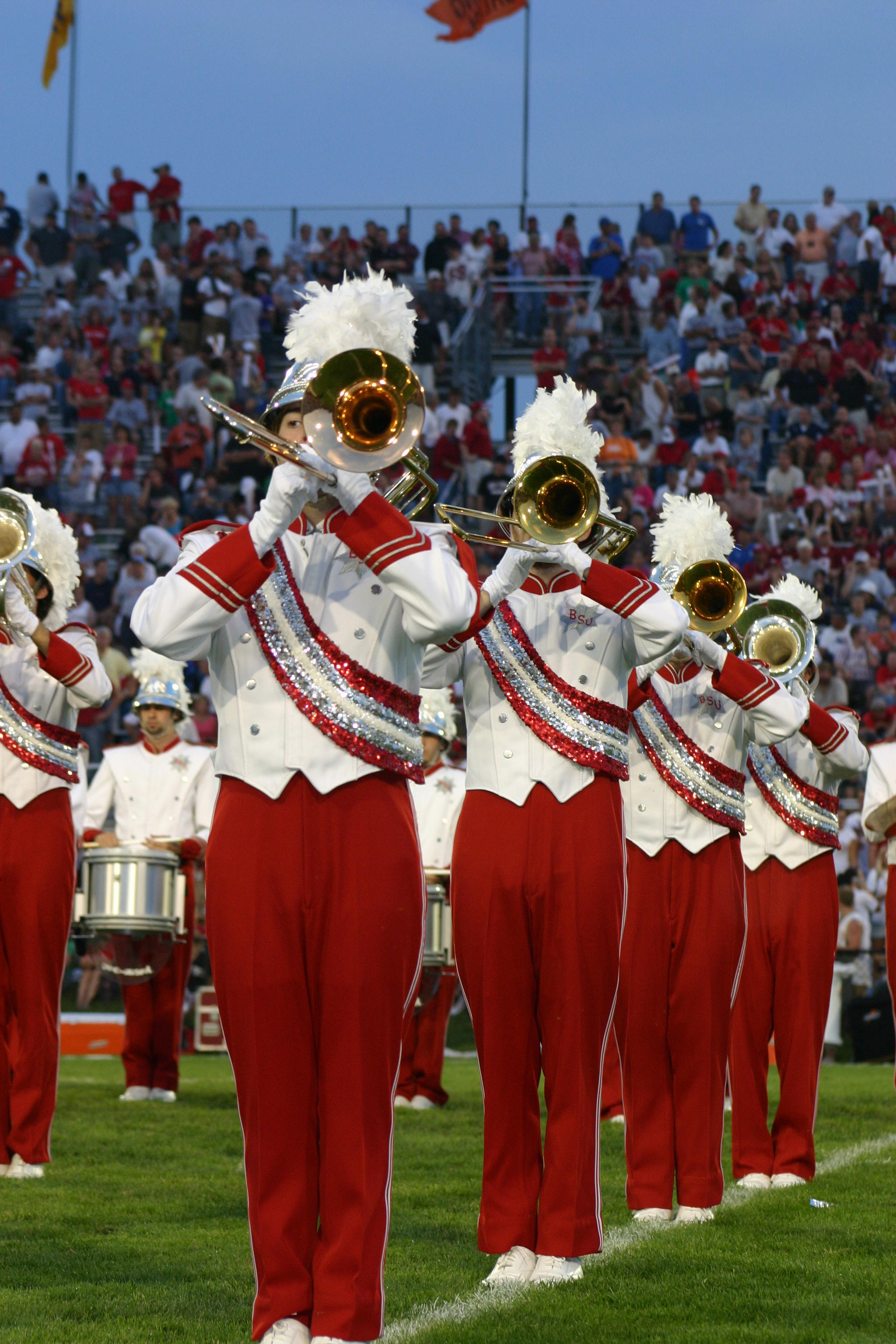
Trombone section during a show in 2006

In the late 1950s, Hargreaves appointed Earl Dunn as the new Director of Bands. During the 1960s, band membership grew from 66 to 190, receiving national recognition for outstanding performances. From homecoming parades to playing with outside musicians, the band was on its way to expanding and carving a name for itself. The marching band even participated in the Inaugural Parade for Lyndon B. Johnson on January 20, 1965.

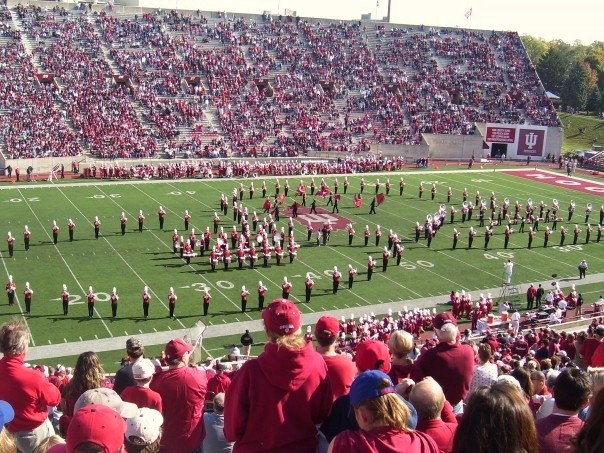
Ball State at Indiana in the fall of 2007

The band also performed for presidents Richard Nixon and George H. W. Bush.

By the mid-1960s, the band had established a reputation for playing Big Band arrangements for the halftime shows. "The Pride" also appeared in the 1965 and 1967 Grantland Rice Bowl games; in televised performances of the Chicago Bears (1966–68); and in the 1967 NFL Championship Game of the Western Conference. By the end of the 1970s, the band had 250 players, and was still growing in both membership and prestige.

In 1984, Joseph Scagnoli became the new director of the Ball State Marching Band. Growing to 300 members, it was the first band in Indiana to perform curvilinear drills on the field. In 1989, the band traveled to Fresno, California for the California Raisin Bowl, and to Las Vegas, Nevada in 1993 and 1995 to perform in the Las Vegas Bowl."The Pride" also played for the Buffalo Bills, Cincinnati Bengals, and the Indianapolis Colts.

The marching band became so popular during the 1990s that it recorded a cassette featuring the Ball State Fight Song, Victory March, and Fanfare. All copies sold out quickly due to its popularity. A compact disc was released in 1998, featuring the Ball State traditional songs and fight songs of the Mid-American Conference. By the end of the decade, Christian Zembower had become the new director.

In 2006, Dr. Thomas Caneva was appointed Director of Bands, and Dan Kalantarian was appointed associate Director of Bands. In 2007, the band executed new drills, debuted a new uniform, and performed for David Letterman (Ball State's most famous alumnus) at the inauguration of the new Letterman Communication and Media Building. They also performed a pregame and halftime show at Indiana University and had an appearance at the International Bowl in early 2008. The band's other appearances included an Indianapolis Colts game at the new Lucas Oil Stadium, an appearance at the MAC Championship in Detroit, Michigan, a trip in early 2009 to Mobile, Alabama for the GMAC Bowl, an appearance at the 2019 Ruoff Kick Off Classic versus Indiana University at Lucas Oil Stadium, and a trip to the 2021 TaxAct Camellia Bowl versus Georgia State at the Cramton Bowl Stadium in Montgomery, Alabama.

== Namesake ==
The name, "Pride of Mid-America," was first introduced in the 1960s by former director Earl Dunn. It is speculated that the name came from the prestige and recognition that the marching band started to have at the time. It was perhaps linked to the sudden growth in number of members during Dunn's direction, or to the university's participation in the Mid-American Conference. What inspired the name is not clearly determined.

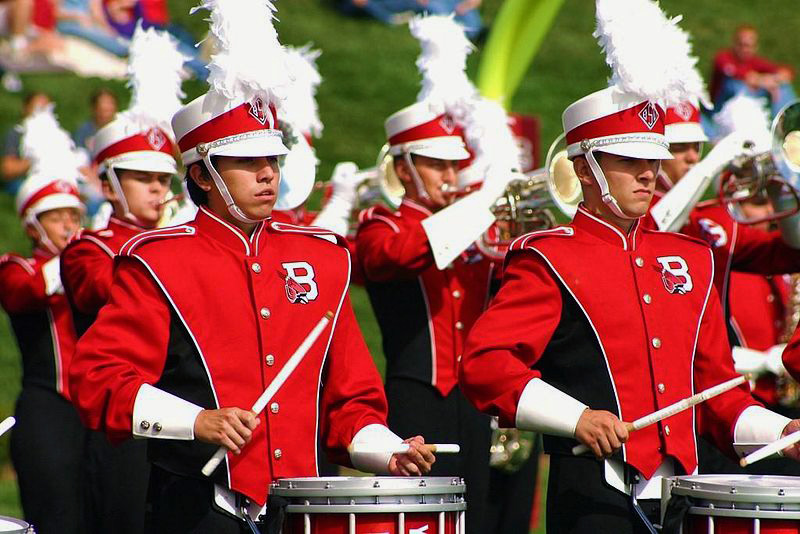
The drumline playing during pregame.

Today, the name represents Ball State and its traditions, and it has become the main title of the marching band. It is also used as encouragement for the members, such as the traditional dismissal after every rehearsal or performance, which goes:

Leader: Band who are we?!
Band: Ball State!
Leader: I said band who are we?
Band: Ball State!
Leader: What do we have?!
Band: PRIDE!
Leader: I said what do we have?!
Band: PRIDE!
Leader: Let's go, let's go!
Band: Let's go, Ball U!

The band members have also started a tradition of singing the words to the Ball State University Victory March at the conclusion of each rehearsal. The words to this festive march were resurrected in 2017.

== Organization ==
=== Instruments and Auxiliary groups ===
"The Pride" consists of a great number of brass and woodwind players, and a limited number of percussion players who are required to audition. As part of the auxiliary, the band currently has a color guard and a feature twirler, but it previously included cardettes and majorettes in past years.

=== Staff ===
==== Director ====
The directors of "The Pride" have often changed their duties and responsibilities. As for today, the director is mainly in charge of arranging the music, and writing drill patterns.

Former and today's directors:

- Dr. Claude E. Palmer (1926 - 1945)
- Dr. Robert Hargreaves (1945 - 1946)
- Mr. Robert Hamilton (1946 - 1950)
- Mr. Herbert Fred (1950 - 1954)
- Dr. Merton Utgaard (1954 - 1957)
- Mr. Earl Dunn (1957 – 1969)
- Mr. Dean DePoy (1969 – 1971)
- Mr. Roger McConnell (1971 – 1984)
- Dr. Joseph Scagnoli (1984 – 1998)
- Dr. Christian Zembower (1998 – 2006)
- Mr. Dan Kalantarian (2006 - 2010)
- Dr. Shawn Vondran (2010 – 2014)
- Dr. Thomas Keck (2014 - 2015)
- Dr. Caroline Hand (2015–2022)
- Dr. Jeremy Harmon (2022–Present)

==== Graduate Assistants ====
They often help and shadow the director as part of their graduate work. The current graduate assistants are Reed Ulery and Bryen Warfield.

==== Appointed Instructors ====
The marching band counts on several instructors to help with the band. They are appointed by the director of bands and/or the assistant director of bands. The band also uses a color guard instructor and a percussion instructor.

The percussion instructor has several duties including instructing the Ball State Drumline by arranging music, directing sectional rehearsals, and practicing drill.

The color guard instructor, Rhonda Reynolds, is responsible for providing and teaching flag and/or dance routine to the group, as well as practicing drill.

==== Drum Majors ====
"POMA" currently has Three drum majors. Their current duties include conducting the band, guiding the players, assisting the section leaders, and enforcing rules and regulations.

==== Section Leaders ====
Each instrument section in the band counts on section leaders. Their main responsibility is to help and guide their peers through learning music and drill during rehearsals. They follow instruction from the director and from the drum majors.

==== Technical Leadership Crew ====
It is vital for the band to have an equipment crew. They are responsible of taking care of the instruments owned by the university (drums and sousaphones) and help with stadium hardware. The crew is led by the Equipment Manager, an individual hired by the band.

==== Uniform Crew ====
The Pride's uniforms are provided and maintained by the uniform crew. This group consists of marching band volunteers who work to make the uniforms show ready throughout the year.

== Music and Drill ==
"The Pride" trumpet feature during a halftime show.

Part of "The Pride's" recognition stems from the entertaining music and drill. Playing a variety of pieces at every halftime, the band is not just for entertainment, but also for supporting the team. Traditional music, like the fight song, is played at most events the band is involved in. Like another other universities fight songs, it represents and identifies the organization and the university.

Members march drill while playing their instruments on the field. The forms vary depending on the theme that is played or the occasion. As of today, the band performs modern drill with a traditional marching style known as relaxed straight leg (walking style), and forms designs from simple geometric shapes and straight lines, to complex curves, words, and figures.

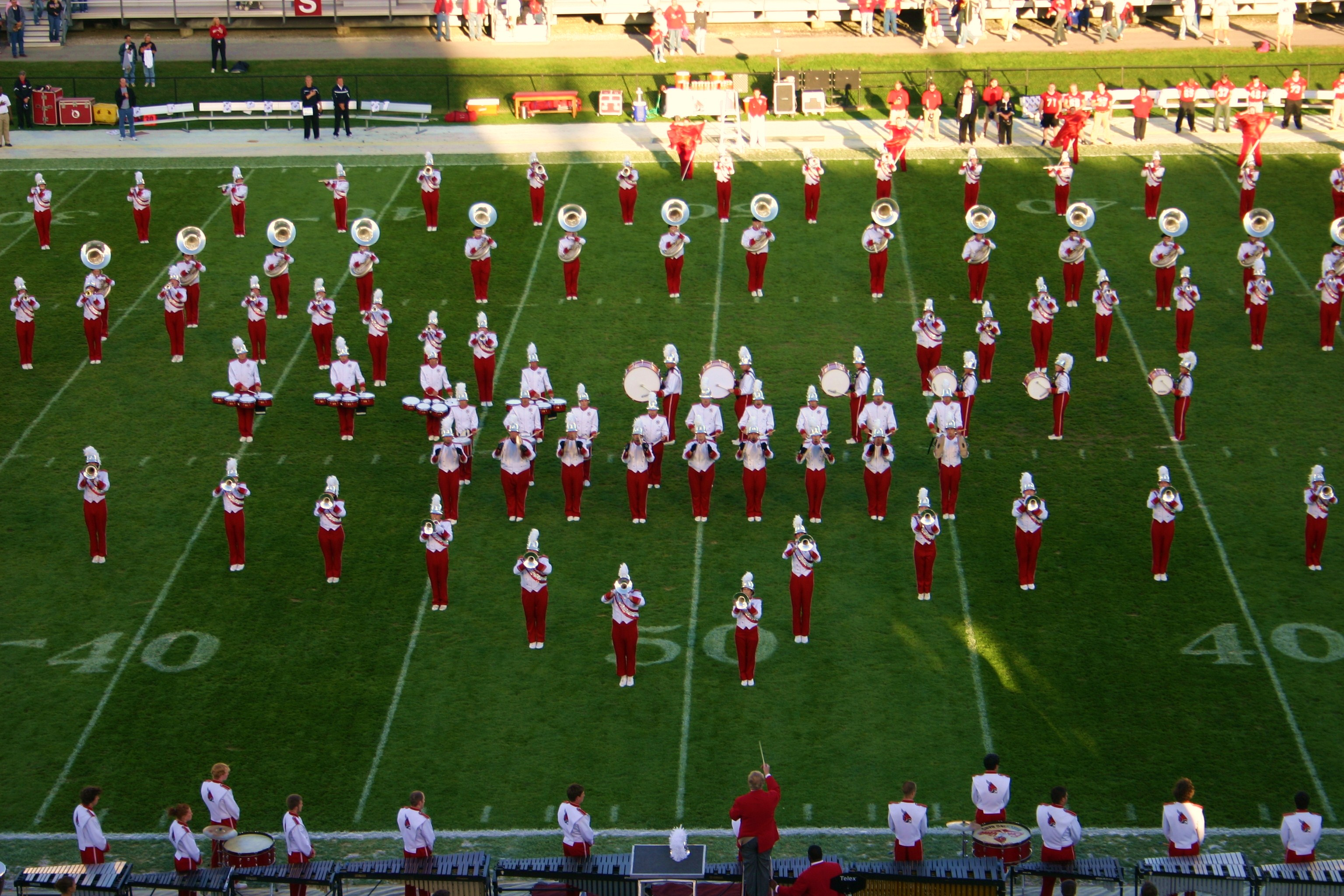
"The Pride" playing Patriotic Medley, as part of a pregame show in 2006.

=== Pregame ===
Part of Ball State football tradition is the pregame show done by "The Pride." In the past, pregame has consisted of:

- The Run-On Cadence played by the drumline, where the rest of the band runs on to the field to begin the show.
- The BSU Fanfare follows the cadence, along with an introduction of the band, the director, the graduate assistants, and the drum majors.

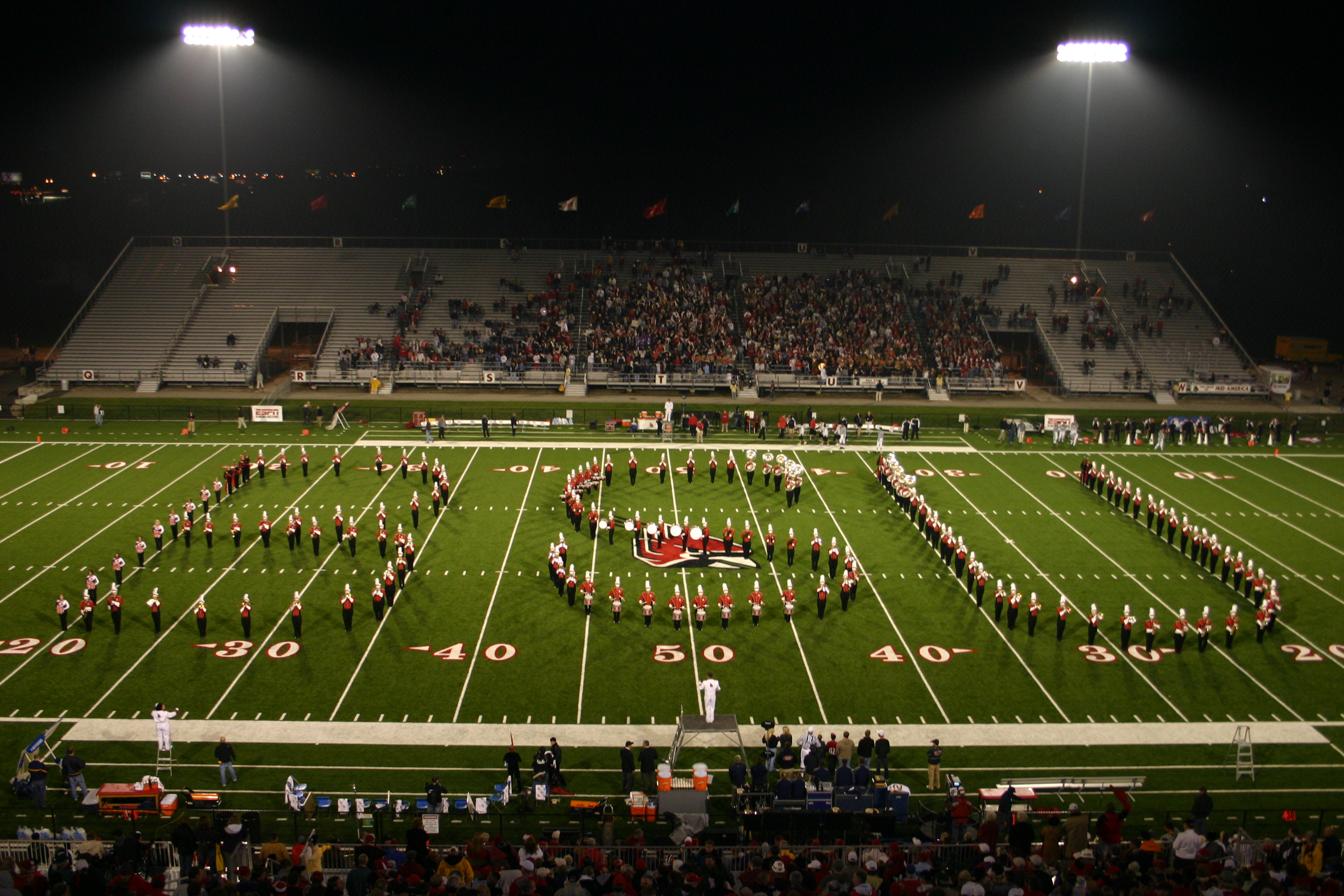
"The Pride" performing the "Ball State Victory March" with the traditional BSU drill.

- The Ball State Fight Song, originally called Fight, Team, Fight. During this, the band marches the traditional counter-march as part of the drill.
- The Ball State Alma Mater is a way the band shows pride and respect to the university.
- Back Home Again in Indiana was added to the pregame show in 2011. During this piece, the band forms an outline of the state of Indiana on the field.
- Part of Patriotic Medley is used as well during the show. At this time, members of the Ball State ROTC come into the field presenting the National Flag, the flag of the state of Indiana, and the flag of the organization, with the words of the narrator: "We salute America, and those who served this great Country to preserve our Freedom".
- The National Anthem, as part of the national tradition in football games.
- At times, the opponent's fight song is played, which is a way to welcome the fans of other teams.
- The Ball State Victory March, which excites the crowd as the band forms the traditional "BSU" drill.
- The "Ball State Fight Song," which ends the show as the band lines up in front of the student section.
- The football team's entrance, immediately following the pregame show, features the "Ball State Fight Song" played by the band as they line up on the edge of the field. In previous years, the entire band had a drill forming a tunnel where cheerleaders would gather as well to receive the football team to the field.

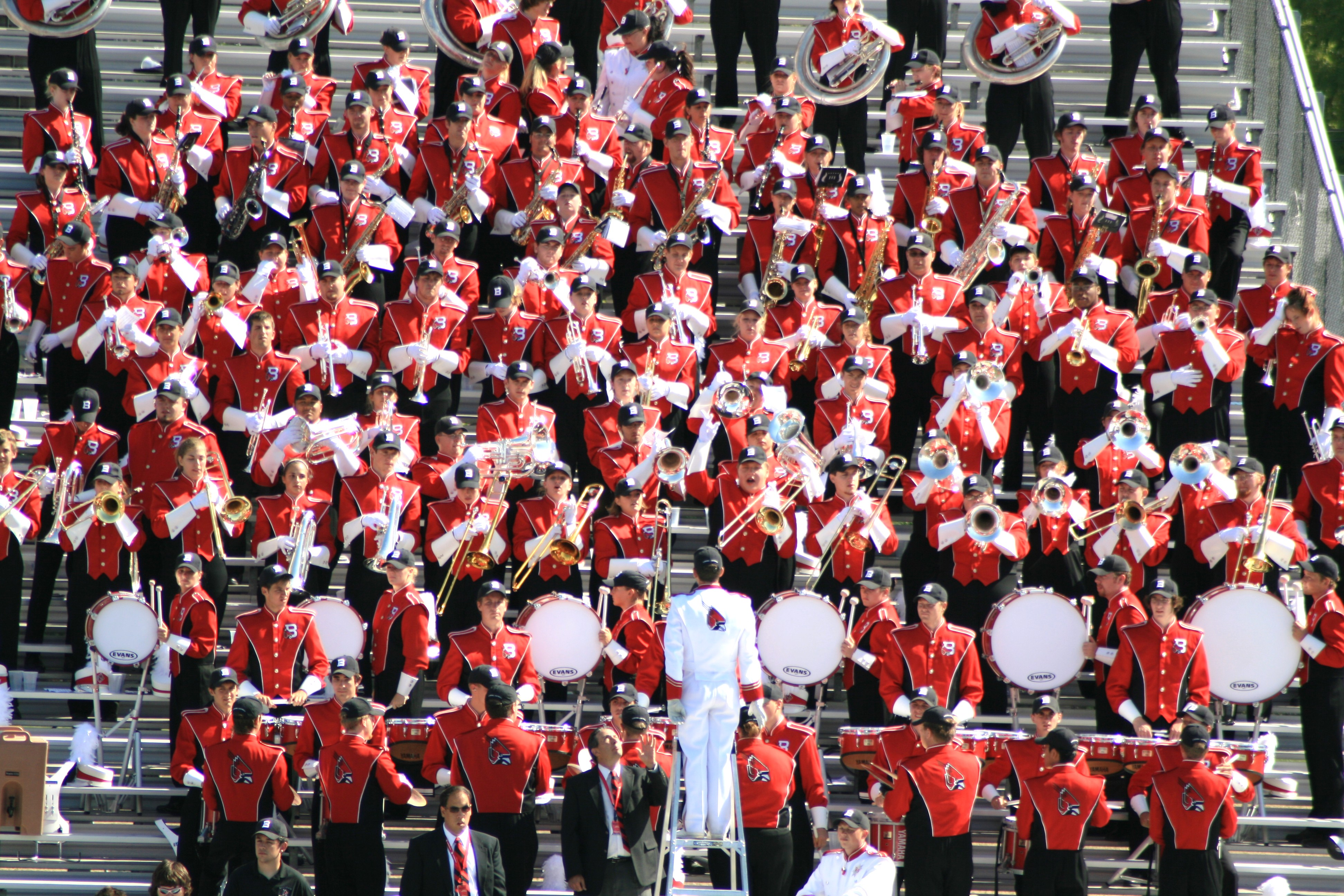
"The Pride" in the stands.

=== Halftime ===
"The Pride's" halftime show consists of a variety of music, such as themes from movies and show, popular tunes on the radio, and classics like Michael Jackson and The Beatles. The music is accompanied by interesting drill and formations by the members.

=== In the Stands ===
During the rest of the game, the band cheers on the football team from the stands, occasionally playing traditional tunes such as the Fight Song, First Down Tag, Go Cheer, Iron Man, Back in Black, Sad But True, Word Up and other various songs.
