= York Prairie Creek =

Stream in Delaware County, Indiana

Coordinates: 40°09′33″N 85°32′51″W

York Prairie Creek is a stream and tributary of the White River in Muncie, Indiana. The stream forms in Muncie near Ball State University and flows across the northern part of its campus near Worthen Arena. It then flows westward across Delaware County and eventually merges into the White River in Daleville, Indiana.
