= Shafer Tower =

Bell tower in Muncie, Indiana, US

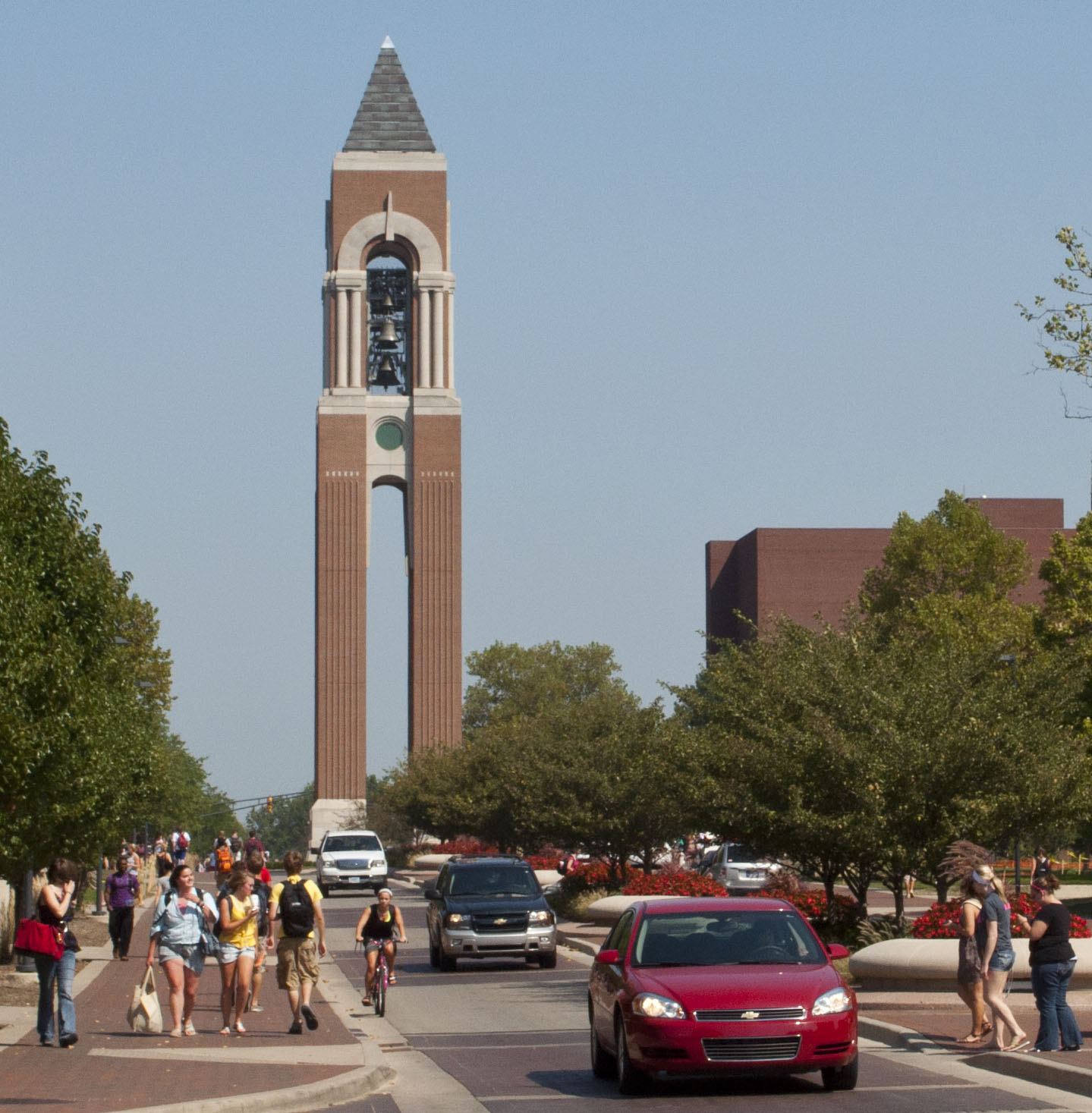
- Shafer Tower and McKinley Avenue

General information
- Type: Campanile
- Architectural style: Modern
- Location: Center of McKinley Avenue, Ball State University, Muncie, Indiana
- Coordinates: 40.20380783°N 85.40800476°W
- Named for: Phyllis and Hamer Shafer
- Completed: 2001

Dimensions
- Other dimensions: 48 bells in the carillon

Design and construction
- Architects: Rundell Ernstberger Associates, designer, Edmund Hafer Associates, technical documents, architect of record

Website
- Shafer Tower Website

Shafer Tower is a 150-foot-tall (46 m) free-standing bell tower, or campanile with a carillon and chiming clock in the middle of the campus of Ball State University in Muncie, Indiana. The tower was conceived and designed by Eric Ernstberger, co-founder of architectural firm Rundell Ernstberger Associates. This three million dollar project was completed at the end of 2001 and received final inspection February 2002. Breaking the record for the highest bell tower in Indiana, Shafer Tower is one of the couple hundred examples of carillon bell towers spread among the United States.

Dedicated in 2002 to Phyllis and Hamer Shafer, Shafer Tower has become an unofficial landmark of Ball State University. It stands in the median of McKinley Avenue on University Green, the northern quadrangle of campus.

A narrow staircase in the tower leads to the control room of the carillon, which has 48 custom-made bells. From here a musician can play the instrument on special occasions or for concerts. The bells are programmed by computer to play the Westminster Quarters to announce the time between 7 a.m. and 7 p.m. One can also control the bells of the tower with a keyboard, which depending on how hard the keys are pressed, will make the bells chime louder. If manual operation is not desired, Shafer Tower is also ready to play over a hundred of already programmed songs.

Due to a construction defect in the type of cement used to build the tower, the masonry on Shafer Tower had to be built twice. Though other courses of action were considered, it was decided the masonry, which was 50% complete, had to be taken down and replaced March 2001. Completion was delayed as a result, however Ball State University didn't have to pay any reconstruction cost. The architect of record was Edmund Hafer Associates of Evansville, Indiana.

== See also ==
- List of carillons in the United States
