= Bracken House, Ball State University =

Residence in Muncie, Indiana, U.S.

Bracken House

General information
- Type: Residence
- Architectural style: Georgian Revival
- Location: 2200 Berwyn Road, Muncie, Indiana, U.S. 47306, United States
- Coordinates: 40.203409°N 85.412136°W
- Named for: Alexander and Rosemary Bracken
- Completed: 1937
- Owner: Ball State University

Technical details
- Floor area: 8,600 sq ft (800 m^{2})

Design and construction
- Architect: Walter Scholer

Website
- Bracken House

The Bracken House is the residence of the President of Ball State University in Muncie, Indiana, United States. The home is located just a few blocks west of the Ball State University campus in the historic neighborhood of Westwood. Many receptions, dinners, and other official university events are hosted at the home. The current residents are Ball State University President Geoffrey S. Mearns and his wife, Jennifer.

== Architecture ==
Alexander and Rosemary (Ball) Bracken hired respected Lafayette architect, Walter Scholer to design the house. The home was built in the Georgian Revival style. Construction took almost two years, being completed in 1937. It was donated to Ball State by the Brackens in 1998. That same year, the university refurbished the home with help from Scholer Corporation, the successor to the original architecture firm. Only limited renovations were needed to update the home for its current purpose.
