= LaFollette Complex =

Former dormitory in Muncie, Indiana, U.S.

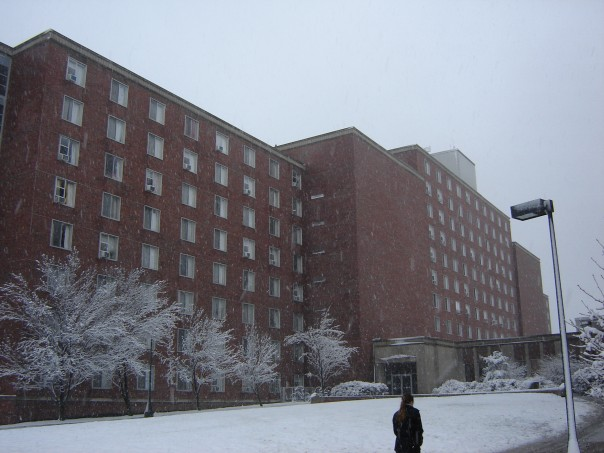

- Location within Indiana

General information
- Type: Dormitory
- Location: Ball State University; McKinley Ave; Muncie, IN 47306
- Coordinates: 40.2068°N 85.4090°W
- Named for: Dr. Robert LaFollette
- Completed: 1967

Design and construction
- Architects: Walter Scholer & Associates

LaFollette Complex was the largest residence hall complex on the Ball State University campus in Muncie, Indiana, United States. The complex housed 1,900 men and women in nine halls. The building itself had a net worth of $11 million. The basement of LaFollette also housed campus offices, classrooms, computer labs and gym equipment. The basement of LaFollette had two dining facilities and there was a buffet-style dining hall on the first floor.

LaFollette is named for Dr. Robert LaFollette, who was a social science professor and department head at Ball State University from 1921 to 1961.

LaFollette Complex was demolished in 2020. A green space was created at the north end of campus where LaFollette used to stand. Alumni can buy a brick from the LaFollette Complex as a memory.

== Construction ==
LaFollette Complex was constructed in 1967 with the most recent remodel in 1998. The brick complex consisted of four L-shaped eight-story towers and a 10-story tower in the center that housed mainly older and international students. LaFollette and two other of Ball State's taller residence halls – Johnson B and Studebaker East (until Studebaker East's remodel in 2011–2012) – were unusual in that they were extremely early co-ed halls. As such, their elevators served only two floors: the first floor lobby, and the sixth floor lobby, which duplicates the first floor almost exactly. This served to separate the male and female portions of the dormitory, as the stairs would pass by lobby doors.

== Background ==
This complex was named in honor of Robert R. LaFollette, who served as the professor of Social Sciences and head of the department from 1921 until his retirement in 1961. He dedicated a significant portion of his life to the pursuit of peace. On March 24, 1967, he was killed in a plane crash on a mountainside north of Da Nang.

To commemorate his legacy, the Robert LaFollette Prize in Social Science was established to recognize the best doctoral thesis. In addition, the Ball State Alumni Association commissioned Nham Chi, a South Vietnamese artist, to paint his portrait.

== Halls ==
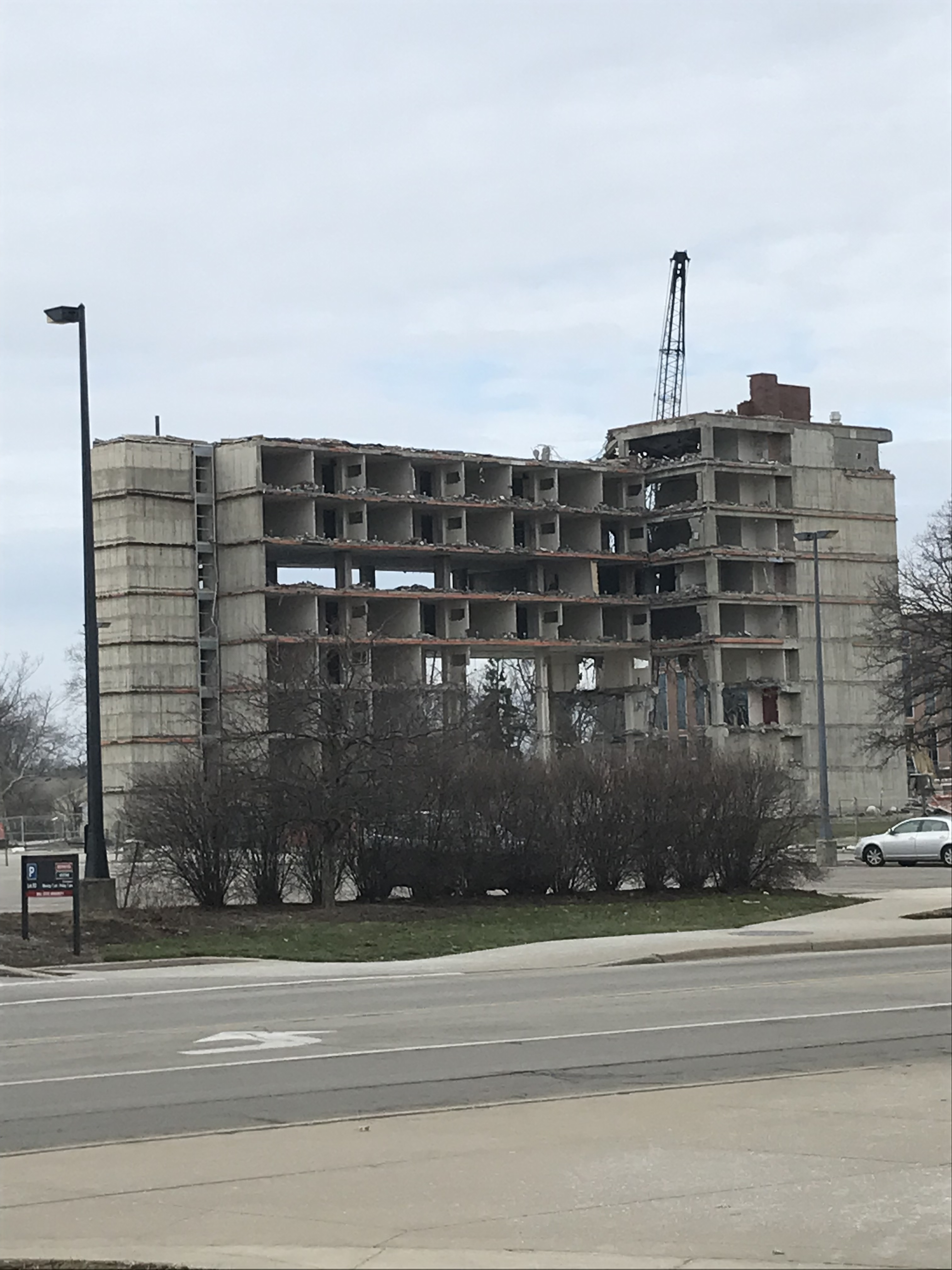
LaFollette Complex mid-demolition, January 2023

=== Knotts/Edwards – demolished 2020 ===
Lucile Knotts had taught at Burris School from 1929 until her retirement in 1953. She continued teaching by lending out a hand at tutoring many different students. She continued tutoring until her death in June 1965.

P.D. Edwards was head emeritus of the Department of Mathematics at Ball State University. He retired from Ball State in 1962 after serving thirty-six years on the faculty.

Knotts/Edwards had eight floors for students and every floor was designated to either female or male.

Students studying in the Miller College of Business were also a part of the Business Living-Learning Community hosted in Knotts/Edwards. Demolition on the tower began in June 2020.

=== Brayton/Clevenger – demolished 2023 ===
Margaret Brayton was the assistant professor emeritus of Elementary education. She also taught Burris kindergartners and first graders for thirty years. Since her retirement in 1962 she continued to make her home in Muncie, Indiana.

Gola H. Clevenger came to Ball State University in 1924 to teach business education. Two years later he became the admissions director. In 1944 his title was changed to Director of Placement and Senior Counselor in 1950. He attended Indiana University before earning his degree from Ball State where he did additional graduate work. Upon his retirement from Ball State in December 1956, Clevenger carried the title of emeritus Director of Placement. He died the summer of 1967.

Brayton/Clevenger had eight floors which were designated to female and male.

This hall used to house the dance and theatre majors. The Theatre and Dance LLC (Living Learning Community) was moved to Schmidt/Wilson Hall in 2017 when the hall reopened after a complete renovation.

Brayton/Clevenger Hall partially collapsed on January 10, 2023, at 5:22 pm EST (10:22 pm UTC). The middle tower, the only portion of the building that did not collapse, was fully demolished on February 9, 2023. This demolishing marked the end of the LaFollette era at Ball State.

=== Mysch/Hurst – demolished 2020 ===
Lawrence Hurst was the associate professor emeritus of Social Science. He retired from the Ball State faculty in 1950 but he continued to be an active observer of university affairs. He returns to Indiana from his home, in May to spend the summer and fall months attending campus educational, sporting, and social events. He is the author of "61 Years in the School Room" which recounts his early teaching before Ball State and to his years being involved with this university.

Lucia Alice Mysch was the associate professor emeritus of Art. She retired in 1963 after having been a member of Ball State for twenty-nine years. She's known for her work in weaving. She has been exhibited nationally and regionally and had an exhibit of the works of the country's top weavers in the Ball State Art Gallery before she retired. She conducted ten art study tours in the United States and Europe while teaching at Ball State. She was also taking her students into the studios and galleries of the many leading craftsmen of the Nation.

This hall housed some of the International Students who attended Ball State University along with the Social Sciences and STEM (Science, Technology, Engineering, and Math) living-learning communities. International Housing was moved to Studebaker East Hall upon its reopening.

The tower was partially demolished in the summer of 2017. It was partially demolished and turned into temporary office space and storage. This tower was not occupied by any students the Fall 2020 semester. It was fully demolished in the winter of 2020.

=== Woody/Shales – demolished 2017 ===
Grace Woody was the associate professor emeritus and coordinator emeritus of Women's Physical Education. She completed thirty-seven years at Ball State, retiring in 1961, she had joined the faculty in 1924.

John M. Shales was part of the Ball State faculty and retired in 1960 after thirty-one years.

Woody/Shales had eight floors which are designated to female and male.

=== Shively – demolished 2020 ===
Levi S. Shively was the professor emeritus of Mathematics. He had taught for 42 years, 23 of these at Ball State University. He retired in 1951.

Shively was the home to many international students, athletes, and those students that are far from home because Shively remained open during holidays and breaks when the other residence halls are closed, until the reopening of Studebaker East.

The residence hall had ten floors with a variety of accommodations.

At the end of the 2013–2014 academic year, Shively Hall was temporarily closed for repairs. The hall reopened in the 2018–2019 year to make up for the lost rooms from the demolished towers brought down in the summer of 2017. The tower began demolition starting June 2020. And was completely demolished in the Winter of 2020.

== LaFollette Field ==
A large open field to the east of LaFollette Complex is known as LaFollette Field. LaFollette Complex overlooks the field, which is used for student recreation and campus events. LaFollette Field is also used mostly by the Ball State University Pride of Mid-America Marching Band during the fall semester for rehearsals.

In an ironic twist of fate, all of the Woody/Shales and half of the Mysch/Hurst Halls of the LaFollette Dormitory Complex to the west were demolished in 2017. The architect presiding over the remodel of the Johnson East and West (formerly A and B respectively) buildings had made the comment that "the antiquated LaFollette wings were blocking the otherwise beautiful view of campus" (LaFollette Field). The new student lounges, with large plate glass windows on every floor of the newly renovated Johnson buildings, face precisely in the direction of LaFollette Field. The university had already planned to eventually demolish Lafollette Complex in the distant future, but the architect's comment helped to expedite the plan.
