= Ball State University Teachers College =

Academic college in Muncie, Indiana, U.S.

Teachers College
- Type: Academic College
- Established: 1918
- Parent institution: Ball State University
- Dean: Anand Marri
- Location: McKinley Avenue and West Riverside Avenue (Scramble Light); 40.200822°N 85.408530°W
- Architect: Walter Scholer & Associates
- Website: www.bsu.edu/teachers

Teachers College is an academic college of Ball State University in Muncie, Indiana. Teachers College is housed in a 10-story, 138 feet (42 m) building which is the second tallest in Delaware County. It is home to six academic departments: Early Childhood, Youth, and Family Studies, Educational Leadership, Educational Psychology, Educational Studies, Elementary Education, and Special Education. It also houses the Office of the Dean and the Office of Teacher Education Services and Clinical Practice.

== History ==
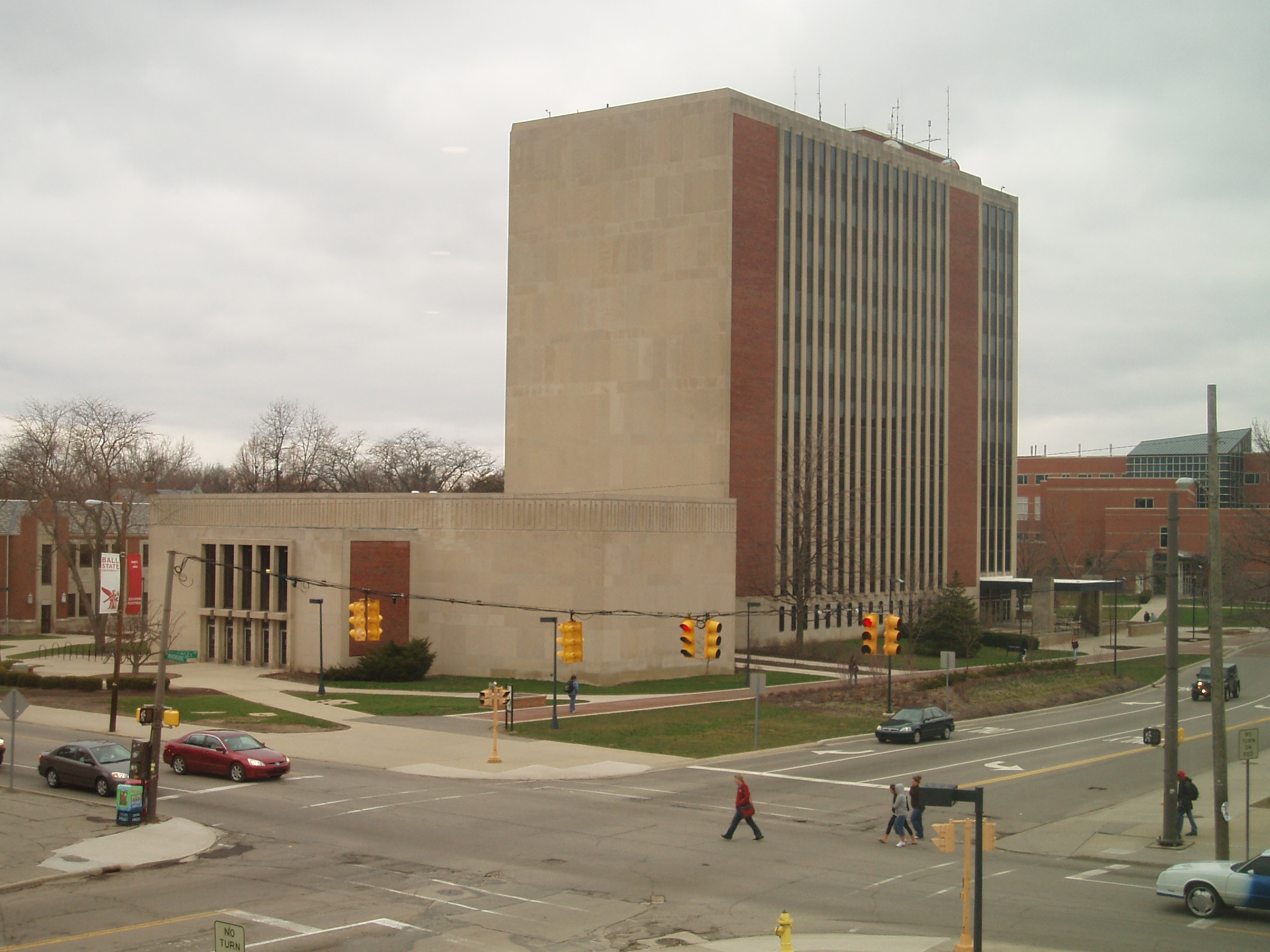
Teachers College Building, as seen from the Scramble Light in 2008.

Ball State University began in 1899 as a private teachers college, the Eastern Indiana Normal School. At this early age all classrooms, residence halls, offices, and dining facilities were located in Ball State University's Administration Building. In 1917 the college, Indiana State Normal School (Eastern Division), was purchased by the Ball Brothers, local industrialists and entrepreneurs. It then was donated to the state of Indiana in 1918, making the teachers college a public institution. In 1922 the campus had expanded to several buildings, and the name was changed to Ball Teachers College and later Ball State Teachers College (1929) to honor the Ball Brothers' dedication to the institution. The Indiana State Teachers College Board governed the school until 1961; a board of trustees was established in 1961 to govern the newly created Ball State College. The college rapidly expanded its curricula and was renamed Ball State University in 1965 in recognition of its growth and in anticipation of its future impact on education in the state of Indiana.

Teachers College remains one of the largest of seven academic colleges at the university and offers a wide selection of academic programs. Its educator programs are accredited by the National Council for Accreditation of Teacher Education, and the college is home to several nationally recognized and distinguished faculty members.

== Academic departments ==
=== Early Childhood, Youth, and Family Studies ===
The Department of Early Childhood, Youth, and Family Studies is located on the sixth floor of Teachers College. This department was formed after a reorganization of departments in 2018.

=== Educational Leadership ===
The Department of Educational Leadership is located on the ninth floor of Teachers College. Formerly known as the Department of Educational Administration and Supervision, it has been granting degrees in educational administration for more than 70 years. Approximately one-third of school superintendents in Indiana received their Ed.S. or Ed.D. degrees from the Educational Leadership programs, and nearly 20% of current Indiana school principals received their license through the Department's master's or licensure programs. The department currently offers three graduate programs in educational administration and supervision.

=== Educational Psychology ===
The Department of Educational Psychology is located on the fifth floor of Teachers College. Its Psychoeducational Diagnostic and Intervention Clinic provides both psychological and educational services to its community through consultation, assessment, and intervention. It provides field-based services to nine school corporations in Indiana, the Burris Laboratory School, the Youth Opportunity Center in Muncie, and approximately 125 local residents annually. The Neuropsychological Laboratory provides evaluations to individuals with known or suspected brain illness or injury and consults with physicians, employers, and schools to monitor treatments and recoveries. The department offers undergraduate courses, an undergraduate minor, and graduate programs.

=== Educational Studies ===
The Department of Educational Studies is located on the eighth floor of Teachers College. It is a "learning community engaged in the preparation of educators, the discovery of knowledge, and the promotion of social justice." Its undergraduate programs prepare future teachers of all grade, junior high/middle school, and secondary classrooms, and its two minors focus on educational technology and multicultural education. The department is home to two doctoral programs, and its five master's degrees include the nationally recognized Student Affairs Administration in Higher Education.

=== Elementary Education ===
The Department of Elementary Education is located on the second floor of Teachers College. Its undergraduate programs prepare future teachers in elementary education, and its graduate programs further develop students' expertise in the education of elementary-age children. Emphasis is placed on blending theory and practice to provide rewarding immersive learning experiences.

=== Special education ===
The Department of Special Education is located on the seventh floor of Teachers College. It boasts eight programs recognized by the Council for Exceptional Children and the most comprehensive special education program in Indiana. Home to the only deaf education program in the state, students have the opportunity to gain field experience at the Indiana School for the Deaf. The department offers six undergraduate majors and three graduate programs.

== Awards ==
See Rankings and Awards.
