= Kent C. Nelson =

American businessman (1937–2023)

Kent Charles "Oz" Nelson (August 13, 1937 – April 6, 2023) was an American businessman who was the chairman and chief executive officer of UPS (United Parcel Service), a position he held from November 1989 to December 1996.

== Life and career ==
A native of Kokomo, Indiana, Nelson received a Bachelor of Arts degree in business administration from Ball State University in 1959. At Ball State, Oz became a brother of the Sigma Phi Epsilon fraternity

Nelson was chairman of the Annie E. Casey Foundation, the world's largest foundation dedicated to helping disadvantaged children. He served as a director of the United Way of America and the United Way of Metropolitan Atlanta.

Nelson was active in several educational initiatives: the Partnership for Kentucky Schools and the Atlanta Chamber of Commerce Education Committee. Nelson was also appointed to the Georgia Governors Education Reform Committee. Nelson served on the Board of Trustees of The Carter Center of Emory University and the Ball State University Foundation. He was also a member of the board of directors of Columbia/HCA Healthcare Corporation and the CDC Foundation.

Ball State University had honored him with two awards: the Distinguished Alumni Award in 1991 and the Business Hall of Fame Award in 1990. He received an honorary doctoral degree from Ball State University in 1994. He also received an honorary doctoral degree of management from Kettering University in June 1993.

== Death ==
Nelson died from complications of COVID-19 in Atlanta, Georgia, on April 6, 2023, at the age of 85.
