= Charlie Cardinal =

University mascot in Muncie, Indiana, U.S.

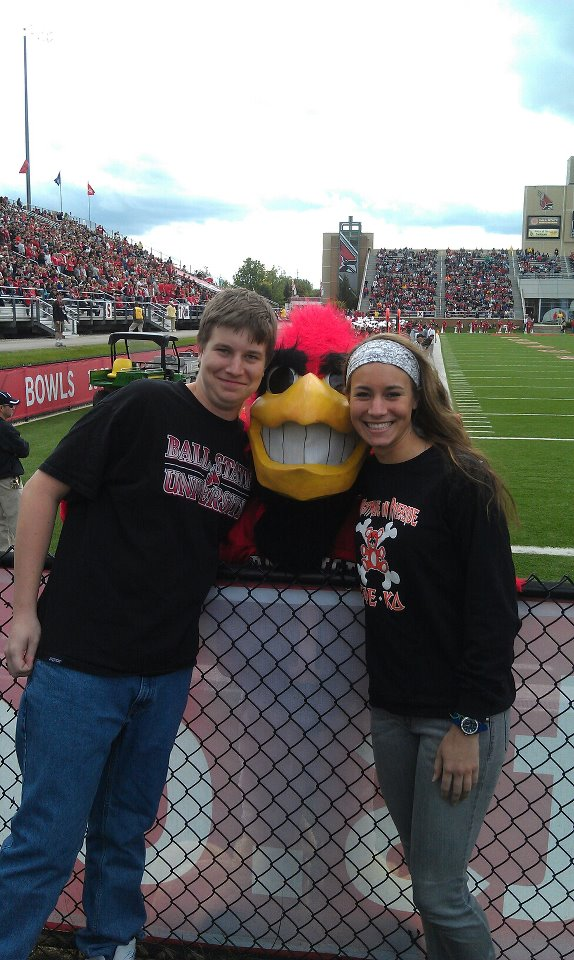
- Charlie at a Ball State Cardinals football game in 2011.
- University: Ball State University
- Conference: MAC
- Description: Anthropomorphic cardinal
- First seen: 1927

Charlie Cardinal is the mascot of Ball State University in Muncie, Indiana. He is an anthropomorphic cardinal.

Ball State's athletics teams have been known as the Cardinals since 1927. Originally nicknamed the "Hoosieroons," discontent led to a school newspaper-sponsored contest to find a new nickname. When no acceptable choices came, a committee was formed, and it was a member of this committee, Professor Paul Billy Williams, who came up with the new nickname of Cardinals. He came up with it while talking to Coach Norman G. Wann, another committee member, about how the logo of his favorite team, the Saint Louis Cardinals, looked distinctive on the jersey of Rogers Hornsby.

Actor and mime Doug Jones portrayed Charlie when he attended Ball State in the early 1980s.

== Former University of Wisconsin-Milwaukee mascot ==
The University of Wisconsin-Milwaukee Cardinals (now the Panthers) had a "Charlie Cardinal" mascot in the 1956-1964 period. Two characters in the Milwaukee-based sitcom Happy Days appeared in one episode in their Charlie Cardinal outfits.
