= Westwood Historic District (Muncie, Indiana) =

Historic district in Indiana, United States

- U.S. National Register of Historic Places
- U.S. Historic district
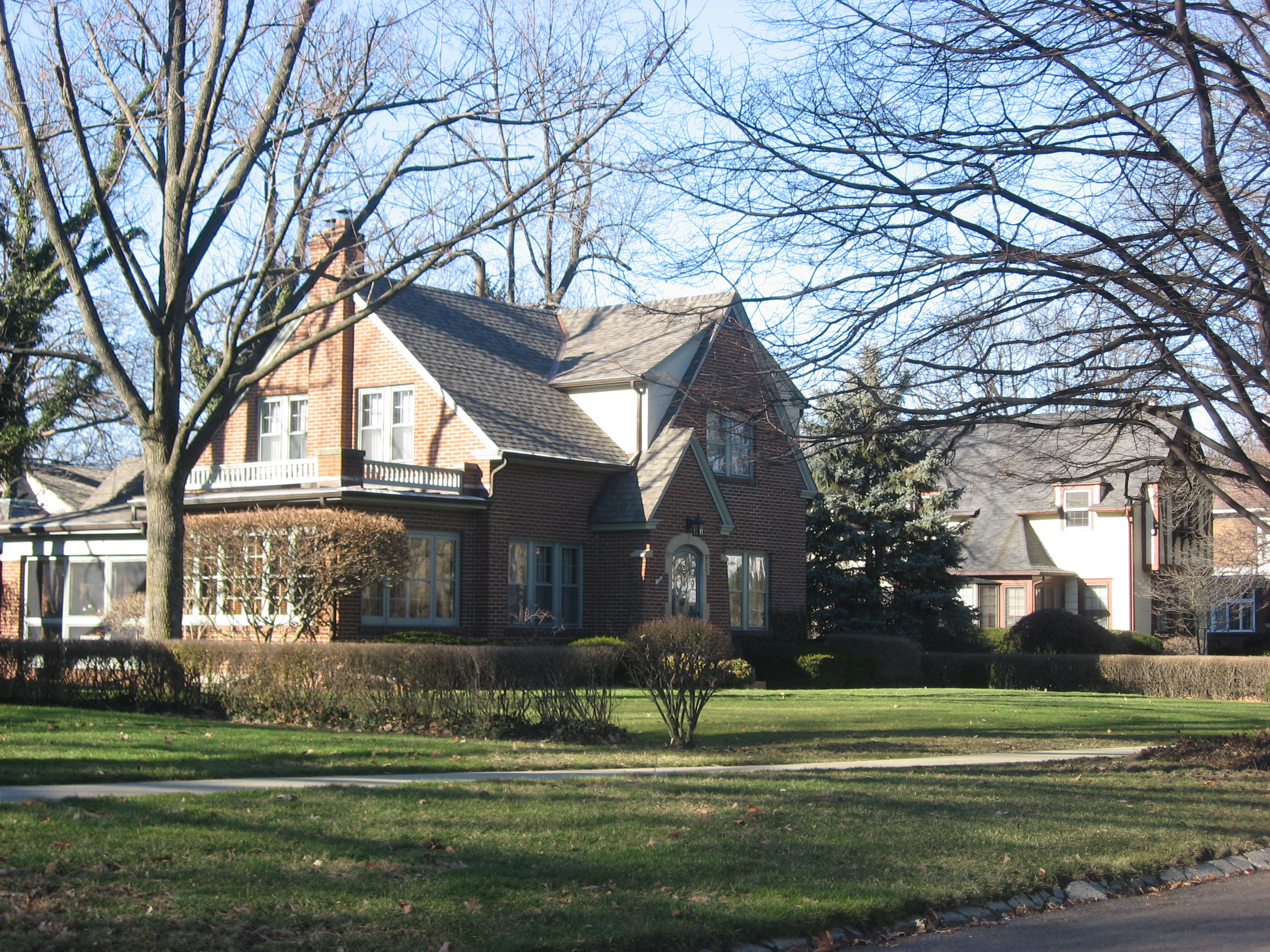
- Berwyn and Meadow in Westwood, January 2012

- Location within Indiana Location within the United States
- Location: Roughly bounded by Briar, Petty and Warwick Rd. and Riverside Ave., Muncie, Indiana
- Coordinates: 40°12′09″N 85°24′44″W
- Area: 60 acres (24 ha)
- Built: 1923
- Architect: Multiple
- Architectural style: Colonial Revival, Bungalow/craftsman, Tudor Revival
- NRHP reference No.: 92000186
- Added to NRHP: April 3, 1992

Westwood Historic District is a national historic district located at Muncie, Indiana. It encompasses 83 contributing buildings and one contributing site in a predominantly residential section of Muncie. The district developed after 1923, and includes notable examples of Colonial Revival, Tudor Revival, and Bungalow / American Craftsman style architecture. Notable buildings include the William H. Ball House (1925), Alexander Bracken House (1937), Michael Broderick House (1928), Bennett Heath House (c. 1930), and Fred Kencht House (1932).

It was added to the National Register of Historic Places in 1992.
