= Immersive learning =

Learning method

Immersive learning is a learning method with students being immersed into a virtual dialogue, the feeling of presence is used as an evidence of getting immersed. The virtual dialogue can be created by two ways, the usage of virtual technics, and the narrative like reading a book. The motivations of using virtual reality (VR) for teaching contain: learning efficiency, time problems, physical inaccessibility, limits due to a dangerous situation and ethical problems.

== Types of immersive learning ==
=== Technical aspect ===
Most of the immersive learning activities are supported by virtual tools including augmented reality (AR), virtual reality (VR), and virtual learning environment (VLE). Immersive VR here specifically refers to the occasions where participants feel "being there" in a virtual place. For educational purpose, the most mentioned virtual projects include Second Life, CAVE VR system, AET Zone are being used in a wide range of disciplines.

Among all the technical tools supporting immersive learning, the CAVE, which defined as a room-like environment with projection screens is well discussed. The CAVE was first studied by the University of Illinois's Electronic Visualization Lab in 1992, which allows huge screens to involve a large number of audiences. Sherman and Craig define CAVE as a theater-like VR venue, which is visually created by computer-generated imagery. Most of the CAVEs today contain 3-6 walls (including ceiling and floor), shaped as a cube or cylinder. It is supported with multisensory channels for human-content interaction, mainly visual, also produces other sensory engagements such as tactile, audio and smell. At this stage, visual and spatial audio appear to be the most-used combination to achieve a certain level of immersion.

=== Cognitive aspect ===
The term textual immersion is used to describe this kind of cognitive immersion, as everyone has the so-called daydream, to image themselves actually being in the story and become the protagonist. This phenomenon is described as getting lost, involved, or drawn into a story, by imagination or other media engagement such as literature and film.

Immersion is also considered by Murray as an experience that create a more than reality world, which is structured by the audience's own cognition. Also, within Ryan's book, the cognitive immersion created by narrative is categorized into three kinds: spatial immersion, temporal immersion and emotional immersion.

Sensory simulations play an essential role to achieve mental immersion, with the combination of primary and secondary senses. The audio engagement within visual stories is welcomed as a way to achieve presence (telepresence), as music helps to arouse emotional factors such as happiness and anger, peacefulness and intense.

== Areas of applications ==
For educational purposes, VR starts to engage as a teaching tool to convey knowledge in an immersive way. It takes the advantage from the characteristics belongs to VR such as engaging and entertaining, to teach art, history, geography and zoology. Among the purposes of learning, the educational theories vary from constructivist, constructionist, and situated.

All the three types of learning are well served by VR, as it supports a wide range of free exploration and construction. In general, VR could also improve knowledge retention and student motivation.

=== Skill training ===
Skill training here refers to the training with a certain level of professional skills for adults. Immersive learning supports the simulation of being in a dangerous or unusual environment, as a safe and effective way for training employees. For forklift truck training, the research team built an immersive CAVE-based VR to simulates the accidents. For the operator training, some plant scenarios such as routine operations and emergency response can be trained within the same CAVE-like space, it also allows multi-players to do the teamwork.

=== Medication ===
Immersive learning usually appears to simulate the accident which need immediate medical support, including heart attack and syncope. Practical studies can be found both in universities and medication agencies, in 3D stereo anatomy teaching, an immersive environment to learn anatomy is built for medical students. Instead of the boring 2D textbook, students are allowed to move the real human parts modelling with a monitor, the visual display also allow zoom-in to browse more details. Further related studies could be found in several research agencies including Harvardmedsim, Autism Treatment and Healthy Simulation.

=== Art and design ===
The needs of teaching art and design ask for a lower level of real-scene simulation, but a higher demand of emotional context and atmosphere. Virtual technics could benefit the teaching and learning activity as it provides essential support for exploration-based learning. Art exploration, which transforms the static art to dynamic art, see VR as a media of expression, also as an open place allow discussion and teamwork. Particularly, studies could be found in the area of innovative teaching to use VR as the tool.

== Effectiveness of learning ==
The effectiveness of immersive learning appears in several ways:

- The realistic simulation of real-life scenes to help with the emergency or unusual situations.
- To simplify the complex contexts and enhance learning effectiveness.
- Add playful and explorational contents compared with a flat 2D learning activity.
- To encourage conceptual thinking, especially for art and design.
- To reduce the noise from surrounded environment and social conflict.

The immersive learning activity has a high level of compatibility, to allow complex teaching tasks including role-playing, free-exploration, narrative and after-course evaluation. In some occasions like medication and skill training, physical tool engagements are also functional to better simulate a real scene, such as use patient models in first aid period.

== Online immersive tools ==
=== Narrative website ===
Narrative website is one of the typical online tools to support immersive learning. It usually appears in the area of visual storytelling, display page of exhibition and historical websites. The storytelling is well-designed to answer the needs of information dissemination and emotional resonance, usually with the support of visual, audio and dynamic design.

For such use case, the Openlearn virtualized a story to enhance the user's sense of substitution by making choices, the Awge simulated a platform of game boy to get visitors immersed. And the Active Theory produces a controllable 3D modeling which could interact with the mouse.

=== Interactive video ===
Within immersive learning, interactive video usually remains as an instrument to make one website or platform interactive and fun. Under some educational purpose, interactive video could function as increasing learning interest and reducing the learning costs. Through clicking and dragging, the interactive video splits complex tasks into small and simple operations, the logic between small tasks is usually build through narrative. Typical examples could be found within the interactive video which introduce Virus, and the art study in Nexus studios.

== Research Groups ==
Immersive Learning Institute, MacEwan University, Canada (ILI)

Immersive Learning Research Network (iLRN)

Center for Immersive Experiences, PennState University, USA (CIE)

== See also ==
- Immersion (virtual reality)
- Telepresence
- Flow (psychology)
- Narrative
- Storytelling
- Virtual reality
- Distance education
- Interactive video
- Cave automatic virtual environment
- Educational game
