= 1937 in art =

Events from the year 1937 in art.

== Events ==
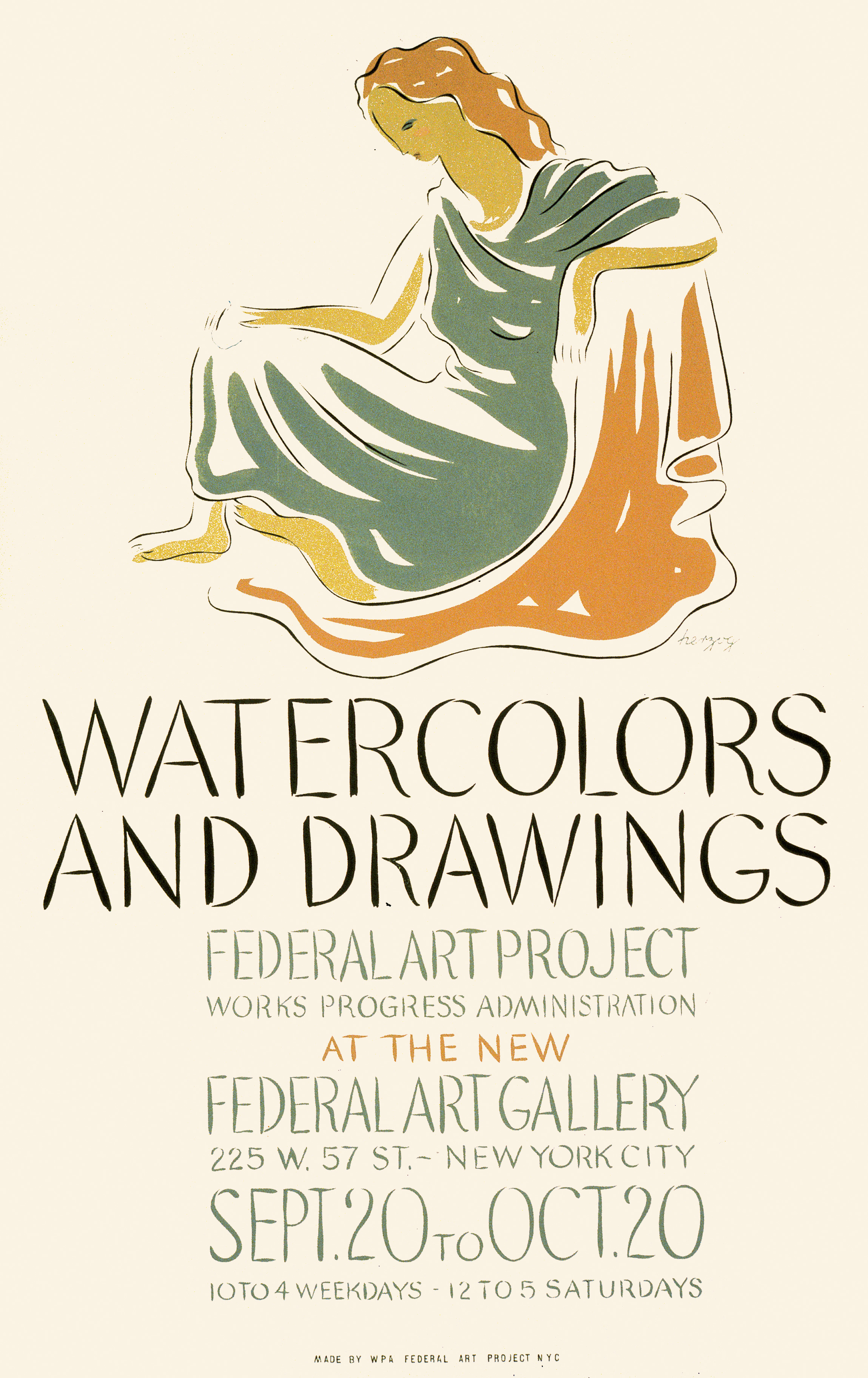
September 20 – The Federal Art Project opens a show in New York

- January 9 – Leon Trotsky begins exile in Mexico with his wife Natalia Sedova; they share The Blue House in Coyoacán with painters Frida Kahlo and Diego Rivera and Trotsky has an affair with Frida.
- February 11 – Les femmes artistes d'Europe opened in Paris at the Jeu de Paume. 550 works from women from 20 countries were shown.
- March 24 - National Gallery of Art in Washington, D.C., established by the United States Congress.
- April 12 - East Anglian School of Painting and Drawing established in England by Cedric Morris and Arthur Lett-Haines.
- May 1–June 4 – Pablo Picasso paints Guernica, a large cubistic monochrome oil painting created in reaction to the German bombing of the Spanish Basque town of the same name on 26 April. It is first exhibited in July at the Spanish Republican government pavilion (designed by Josep Lluís Sert) in the Exposition Internationale des Arts et Techniques dans la Vie Moderne in Paris before commencing a world tour. René Iché created a sculpture Guernica the day after the bombing took place, but will not exhibit it in his lifetime. The Spanish Government pavilion at the International Exhibition also includes Horacio Ferrer's Madrid 1937 (Black Aeroplanes), Joan Miró's The Reaper and a mercury fountain by Alexander Calder. Vera Mukhina's sculpture Worker and Kolkhoz Woman is also created for the Exhibition.
- May 3 – The Royal Academy Exhibition of 1937 opens at Burlington House in London
- May – Stanley Spencer and his wife Hilda are divorced; within a week he marries Patricia Preece who departs on honeymoon to St Ives with her partner Dorothy Hepworth while he resumes relations with Hilda at Cookham.
- July 18 – Große Deutsche Kunstausstellung ("Great German Art Exhibition") opened by Adolf Hitler in the Haus der deutschen Kunst ("House of German Art") in Munich, newly completed to the designs of Paul Troost (d. 1934) to display art of the Third Reich. Hitler has rejected the choices of the original selection jury and placed his personal photographer Heinrich Hoffmann in charge of curating the display, but even so has rejected some of the more experimental paintings.
- July 19 – Entartete Kunst ("Degenerate art") exhibition, mounted by the Nazis, opens in Munich.
- October – Formation in London of the Euston Road School, a private School of Drawing and Painting originally established in Fitzroy Street by William Coldstream, Claude Rogers and Victor Pasmore, and giving name to the group of naturalist artists associated with it.
- December 21 – Premiere of Walt Disney's Snow White and the Seven Dwarfs in the United States, the first full-length animated feature film (concept artist: Albert Hurter).
- The exhibition The Origins and Development of International Independent Art held at the Galerie nationale du Jeu de Paume in Paris brings Chaïm Soutine to prominence.
- Surrealist exhibition Objects and Poems arranged at his newly opened London Gallery (on Cork Street) by Roland Penrose.
- The Avant-Garde Image Group is founded by Japanese photographer Terushichi Hirai.
- Circle, a manifesto for abstract-constructivist art, is published.
- American painters Paul Cadmus, Jared French and Margaret French (née Hoening) form the PaJaMa photographic collective.
- Statues by Jacob Epstein on Rhodesia House, London, are mutilated.
- 1937–1938 – Mussolini has the Ara Pacis Augustae reconstructed in its present location.

== Works ==
=== Paintings ===
- Endre Bálint – My Room at the Bindendorfs
- Balthus – The Mountain
- Gerald Brockhurst
  - Portrait of Merle Oberon
  - Ophelia
- William Coldstream
  - On the Map
  - Winifred Burger
- Ralston Crawford – Buffalo Grain Elevators
- John Steuart Curry – Ajax
- Salvador Dalí
  - The Burning Giraffe
  - Couple with Their Heads Full of Clouds (second version)
  - Metamorphosis of Narcissus, a surrealist work influenced by the Greek myth of Narcissus
  - Swans Reflecting Elephants
- Edwin Dickinson – Composition with Still Life
- Óscar Domínguez – The Infernal Machine
- Max Dupain – Sunbaker
- Arthur Dove – Me and the Moon
- M. C. Escher – woodcuts
  - Metamorphosis I
  - Still Life and Street, his first impossible reality
- Alberto Giacometti – The Artist's Mother
- Charles Ginner – Flask Walk, Hampstead, on Coronation Day
- Gluck – Medallion
- Hermann Otto Hoyer – Am Anfang war das Wort ("In the beginning was the word")
- Gladys Hynes – Private View
- Edwin Boyd Johnson – Airmail (fresco for United States Post Office, Melrose Park, Illinois)
- Lily Delissa Joseph – Roofs, High Holborn
- Frida Kahlo
  - The Deceased Dimas
  - Me and My Doll
  - Memory - the heart
  - My Nurse and I
  - Self-Portrait Dedicated to Leon Trotsky
- Oskar Kokoschka
  - Olda Palkovská
  - Self-portrait as a degenerate artist
- Hubert Lanzinger
  - The Standard Bearer
- René Magritte
  - The Black Flag
  - Not to be Reproduced
  - On the Threshold of Liberty
- Henri Matisse
  - Lady in Blue
  - Robe violette et Anémones
  - Woman in a Purple Coat
  - Yellow Odalisque (second version, Philadelphia Museum of Art)
- Joan Miró
  - Naked woman climbing a staircase
  - Still Life with Old Shoe
  - Aidez l'Espagne
  - The Reaper
- Alfred Munnings – After the Race
- Georgia O'Keeffe – Jimson Weed
- Pablo Picasso
  - Guernica
  - Femme au béret et à la robe quadrillée (Marie-Thérèse Walter)
  - Portrait of Lee Miller (7 individual paintings)
  - The Weeping Woman
  - Woman in Hat and Fur Collar
- Georges Rouault – The Breton Wedding
- Amrita Sher-Gil
  - Brahmacharis
  - Bride's Toilet
  - The South Indian Villagers
- Stanley Spencer – Double Nude Portrait: The Artist and his Second Wife
- Edward Wadsworth – The Beached Margin
- Rex Whistler – Capriccio (Dining room mural), Plas Newydd, Anglesey
- Victor Vasarely – Zebra
- Adolf Ziegler – Die vier Elemente ("The Four Elements", triptych)

=== Photographs ===
- Margaret Bourke-White – At the Time of the Louisville Flood (photograph)
- H. S. Wong – Bloody Saturday (photograph)

=== Sculptures ===
- Franz Ehrlich – Gates to Buchenwald concentration camp
- John Gregory – Anthony Wayne
- A. F. Hardiman – Earl Haig Memorial
- René Iché – Guernica
- Charles Keck – Statue of Francis P. Duffy (bronze, Duffy Square, New York City)
- Lee Lawrie – Atlas
- Ronald Moody – Midonz (carved wood head)
- Vera Mukhina – Worker and Kolkhoz Woman
- Edith Barretto Stevens Parsons – Frog Baby Fountain

== Awards ==
- Archibald Prize: Normand Baker – Self Portrait

== Births ==
- January 21 – Sally Soames, born Winkleman, English photographer (d. 2019)
- February 11 – Mauro Staccioli, Italian sculptor (d. 2018)
- March 11 – Hossein Zenderoudi, Iranian artist
- March 23 – Parviz Tanavoli, Iranian-born sculptor
- March 27 – Thomas Aquinas Daly, American painter
- May 4 - Melvin Edwards, American sculptor and printmaker (d. 2026)
- May 31 – Larry Zox, American painter and printmaker (d. 2006)
- June 7 – Red Grooms, born Charles Rogers Grooms, American multimedia pop artist
- June 27 – Alona Frankel, Polish-born Israeli writer, illustrator
- July 2 – Lance Wyman, American graphic artist
- July 9 – David Hockney, English painter (d. 2026)
- August 2 – John Salt, English painter
- August 18 – Willie Rushton, English cartoonist, satirist, comedian, actor and performer (d. 1996)
- September 1 – Allen Jones, English pop art sculptor and painter
- October 1 – Larry Poons, Japanese-born American op artist
- October 6 – Fritz Scholder, Native American painter, printmaker and graphic artist (d. 2005)
- October 12 – Robert Mangold, American minimalist painter
- October 19 – Peter Max, German-born American printmaker and graphic designer (d. 2026)
- October 22 – Aiko Suzuki, Canadian textile and visual artist (d. 2005)
- December 16 – Edward Ruscha, American painter, printmaker, photographer and conceptual artist
- full date unknown – Ronald Davis, American painter

== Deaths ==
- January 29 – Marc-Aurèle de Foy Suzor-Coté, Canadian painter and sculptor (b. 1869)
- February 11 – Suzette Holten, Danish painter and ceramist (born 1863)
- February 18 – Joseph Ehrismann, German-born painter and stained-glass maker (born 1880)
- February 28 – Harrington Mann, Scottish-born portrait painter and decorative artist in the United States (b. 1864)
- March 9 – Alfred Flechtheim, German-born art dealer, collector and publisher (b. 1878)
- March 12 – Eveleen Tennant Myers, English portrait photographer (b. 1856)
- April 19 – Martin Conway, English art critic (b. 1856)
- May – Peter Waals, Dutch-born furniture designer (b. 1870)
- July 26 – Gerda Taro, German-born photographer, killed in Spanish Civil War (b. 1910)
- October 29 – Élie Faure, French art historian (b. 1873)
- November 6 – Colin Campbell Cooper, American painter (b. 1856)
- November 11 – Helen Thornycroft, English painter (b. 1848)
- December 5 – János Thorma, Hungarian Post-Impressionist painter (b. 1870)
- December 6
  - Francis Cadell, Scottish Colourist painter (b. 1883)
  - Florence Griswold, American curator (b. 1850)

== See also ==
- 1937 in fine arts of the Soviet Union
