= List of public art in Muncie, Indiana =

This is a list of public art in Muncie, Indiana.

This list applies only to works of public art accessible in an outdoor public space. For example, this does not include artwork visible inside a museum.

Most of the works mentioned are sculptures. When this is not the case (e.g., sound installation,) it is stated next to the title.

Title	Artist	Year	Location/GPS Coordinates	Material	Dimensions	Owner	Image
Alice Nichols	Tuck Langland		Ball State University Fine Arts Building			Ball State University	
Appeal to the Great Spirit	Cyrus Edwin Dallin	1908		Bronze	Sculpture: approx. 38 × 25 × 37 in.	City of Muncie	
Awakening Potential	Kenneth G. Ryden	2006	Youth Opportunity Center	Bronze	8 1/2 ft tall	Youth Opportunity Center	
Beneficence	Daniel Chester French	1937	Ball State University	Bronze	Sculpture: approx. H. 5 ft. 6 in. × 5 ft. × 4 ft.	Ball State University	
Boy, Girl, Dog & Puppy	Unknown	ca. 1957	Elm Ridge Cemetery	Marble	Sculpture: approx. 4 ft. × 2 ft. 6 in. × 2 ft.	Service Corporation International	
Boy Listening to Watch	Unknown	ca. 1957	Elm Ridge Cemetery	Marble	Sculpture: approx. 3 ft. × 1 ft. 6 in. × 1 ft. 6 in.	Service Corporation International	
Boy Reading Book	Unknown	ca. 1957	Elm Ridge Cemetery	Marble	Sculpture: approx. 3 ft. 6 in × 2 ft. × 2 ft. 6 in.	Service Corporation International	
Bronze Baby	Brenda Putnam	1916	Minnetrista	Bronze		Minnetrista	
Buttercup, Poppy and Forget-Me-Not	Mabel Landrum Torrey	ca. 1957	Elm Ridge Cemetery	Bronze	Sculpture: approx. 1 ft. 3 in. × 1 ft. 3 in. × 1 ft.	Service Corporation International	
Catalyst	Beverly Stucker Precious	2004	Minnetrista	Limestone, Stainless steel & Glass	26 ft d.	Minnetrista	
Colonnade Columns		1993–1994	Minnetrista			Minnetrista	
Colonnade Gates	Samuel Yellin	1993–1994	Minnetrista	Wrought iron		Minnetrista	
Columns			Minnetrista	Indiana Limestone		Minnetrista	
Face of Christ (relief)	Warren Vale Casey	1952	St. Mary's Parish School	Lead, Bronze	Sculpture: approx. 2 × 1 ft. 6 in. × 3 1/2 in.	St. Mary's Church	
Father/Mother/Daughter/Son	Unknown	ca. 1957	Elm Ridge Cemetery	Marble	Sculpture: approx. 9 ft. × 4 ft. 3 ft. 6 in.	Service Corporation International	
Fireflies	Paul Moore	1995	Muncie Children's Museum	Bronze		Muncie Children's Museum	
Five Points Fountain		1911	Heekin Park			City of Muncie	
Flight	Unknown	ca. 1988	Elm Ridge Cemetery - Zeigler Cemetery Plot	Bronze	Sculpture: approx. 3 × 3 × 1 ft. 6 in.	Service Corporation International	
Fountain of Joy	Helen Farnsworth Mears	1916	Minnetrista	Brass		Minnetrista	
Frog Baby Fountain	Edith Barretto Stevens Parsons	1937	Ball State University	Bronze	Sculpture: approx. 3 ft. 2 in. × 16 in. × 10 in.	Ball State University	
Gazebo		ca. 1939	Minnetrista	Wrought iron		Minnetrista	
George McCulloch Memorial	Leonard Crunelle	1915	McCulloch Park	Bronze	Sculpture: approx. 8 × 3 × 3 ft.	City of Muncie	
Girl Trying on Necklace	Unknown	ca. 1957	Elm Ridge Cemetery	Marble	Sculpture: approx. 3 ft. × 1 ft. 6 in. × 1 ft. 6 in.	Service Corporation International	
Greenway Graffiti	Various Artists		White River Greenway	Spray paint		City of Muncie	
Innocence	Mabel Landrum Torrey	ca. 1957	Elm Ridge Cemetery	Bronze	Sculpture: approx. 2 ft. × 4 ft. × 1 ft. 6 in.	Service Corporation International	
Kneeling Female	Unknown	ca. 1957	Elm Ridge Cemetery	Marble	Sculpture: approx. 4 ft. × 2 ft. 3 in. × 2 ft. 6 in.	Service Corporation International	
Light Symphony	Stephen Knapp	2006	Ball State University - Music Instruction Building	Glass & Light	h 23 × l 40	Ball State University	
Maxi-Antecedent II	Lila Katzen	1978	Ball State University - Fine Arts Building	Steel		Ball State University	
Monsignor Edgar Cyr	J. Faulkner	1985	St. Mary's Church	Bronze	Sculpture: approx. 1 ft. 6 in. × 10 in. × 10 in.	Saint Mary's Church	
Moses and Pharaoh's Daughter	Unknown	ca. 1957	Elm Ridge Cemetery	Marble	Sculpture: approx. 4 × 4 × 4 ft.	Service Corporation International	
Nightsong	Joe Beeler	1998	Riverbend Park	Bronze		City of Muncie	
Old Delaware County Courthouse Statues	John A. Ward	1887	Just north of the intersection of Jackson & Main.	Limestone	3 figures. (Delaware chief: approx. 10 ft. × 3 ft. × 2 ft. 6 in.); (Agriculture: approx. 6 ft. 6 in. × 4 ft. 6 in. × 3 ft.); (Industry: approx. 6 ft. 6 in. × 4 ft. 6 in. × 3 ft.).	City of Muncie	
Our Blessed Mother and the Lord	George Yostel	ca. 1965	Saint Mary's Church	Limestone	2 pieces. Blessed Mother: approx. 24 ft. × 6 ft. × 3 ft. 6 in.; Jesus: approx. 12 ft. × 9 ft. × 2 ft. 6 in.	Saint Mary's Church	
The Passing of the Buffalo	Cyrus Edwin Dallin	1929	Roundabout at Walnut and Seymour	Bronze	Figure: approx. 9 ft. × 4 ft. × 4 ft. 6 in.	City of Muncie	
Praying Girl	Unknown	ca. 1957	Elm Ridge Cemetery	Marble	Sculpture: approx. 3 ft. 6 in. × 2 ft. × 2 ft. 6 in.	Service Corporation International	
Praying Jesus	Cyrus Edwin Dallin	ca. 1954	Elm Ridge Cemetery	Marble	Sculpture: approx. 5 ft. 9 in. × 2 ft. × 3 ft. 6 in.	City of Muncie	
St. Joseph and Child Jesus	Unknown	1952	St. Mary's School	Bronze	Sculpture: approx. 4 ft. × 1 ft. 3 in. × 1 ft. 3 in.	Saint Mary's Church	
Scherzo	Harriet Whitney Frishmuth	1929	Bracken Library, Ball State University	Bronze	Figure: approx. 7 × 3 × 2 ft.	Ball State University	
Shepherd	Richard Kishel	1981	Fountain Square United Methodist Church	Fiberglass	2 figures. Shepherd: approx. 16 × 3 × 3 ft.; Sheep: approx. 5 ft. × 5 ft. 6 in. × 3 ft.	Fountain Square United Methodist Church	
Sitting Boy Looking at Foot	Unknown	ca. 1957	Elm Ridge Cemetery	Marble	Sculpture: approx. 3 ft. 6 in. × 2 ft. × 2 ft. 6 in.	Service Corporation International	
Spirit of the American Doughboy	E.M. Viquesney	1934	Elm Ridge Cemetery	Bronze	Sculpture: approx. 6 × 4 × 4 ft.	Service Corporation International	
Standing Boy with Book	Unknown	ca. 1957	Elm Ridge Cemetery	Marble	Sculpture: approx. 4 ft. × 2 ft. × 2 ft. 6 in.	Service Corporation International	
Three Children	Mabel Landrum Torrey	ca. 1957	Elm Ridge Cemetery	Marble	Sculpture: approx. 2 ft. 6 in. × 2 ft. 6 in. × 2 ft.	Service Corporation International	
Threshold of Knowledge	Kenneth G. Ryden	2001	Edmund Ball Center for Medical Education	Bronze	h. 10 ft.		
Tribute to Mankind	Richard F. Kishel	1973	Ball State University - Studebaker Hall	Cor-ten Steel	h. 20 ft.	Ball State University	
Two Laughing Children Playing in Water	Grace Helen Talbot		Ball State University - Center for University & Community Programs	Bronze	Sculpture: approx. H. 2 ft. × Diam. 4 ft. 6 in.	Ball State University	
Unity Bridge	Brian Blair		Madison Street South of Charles Street	Paint		City of Muncie	
Untitled	Richard Kishel	1966	Slavin Dental Clinic	Concrete	2 walls. Each wall: approx. 9 ft. × 30 ft. × 8 in.	Slavin Dental Clinic	
Virgin Mary & Child	V. Moroder	1951	St. Mary's School	Bronze	Sculpture: approx. 5 ft. 9 in. × 2 ft. × 2 ft.	Saint Mary's Church	
Weeping Woman	Unknown	ca. 1957	Elm Ridge Cemetery	Marble	Sculpture: approx. 4 ft. × 1 ft. 6 in. × 2 ft. 6 in.	Service Corporation International	
Will O' The Wisp	Edward Borse		Minnetrista			Ball State University	
Wishing Well	Unknown		Minnetrista	Bronze		Minnetrista	
Wysor Building Entry	Cuno Kibele	1906					
X Notion, Like a J	Lila Katzen	1977	Ball State University Museum of Art	Cor-ten Steel	Sculpture: approx. 12 ft. × 7 ft. 2 in. × 4 ft.	Ball State University	
