= Royal Academy Exhibition of 1937 =

1937 art exhibition in London

Portrait of Jessie Matthews by Thomas Cantrell Dugdale

The Royal Academy Exhibition of 1937 was the hundred and sixty seventh annual Summer Exhibition of the British Royal Academy of Arts which was held at Burlington House in Piccadilly in London between 3 May and 7 August 1937. It drew over a hundred thousand visitors and featured a variety of mediums including oil paintings, watercolours and sculpture.

== Paintings ==
Alfred Munnings exhibited six paintings which included one of his best-known works After the Race, showing the aftermath of a horse race at Cheltenham. Munnings was one of a number of artists who reflected the continued importance of British Impressionism in interwar art. The Newlyn School was represented by a number of artists including the veteran Stanhope Forbes.

The exhibition was noted for several glamorous works by the fashionable portraitist Gerald Brockhurst as well as Ophelia. This included his Portrait of Merle Oberon featuring the film star. One of the most popular works on display was a portrait of the musical star by Jessie Matthews by Thomas Cantrell Dugdale.

The history painting The Founding of Australia, 1788 by Algernon Talmage was displayed. Roofs, High Holborn by Lily Delissa Joseph was acquired by the Chantrey Bequest. Two considerably older works were both displayed as well. James Tissot's The Ball on Shipboard (first exhibited in 1874) was also acquired by the Chantrey Bequest while Frank Cadogan Cowper's 1907 painting Vanity had been submitted as his diploma work to the Royal Academy the previous year and was shown again.

== Selected works ==
Roofs, High Holborn by Lily Delissa Joseph

The Duck Pond by Stanhope Forbes

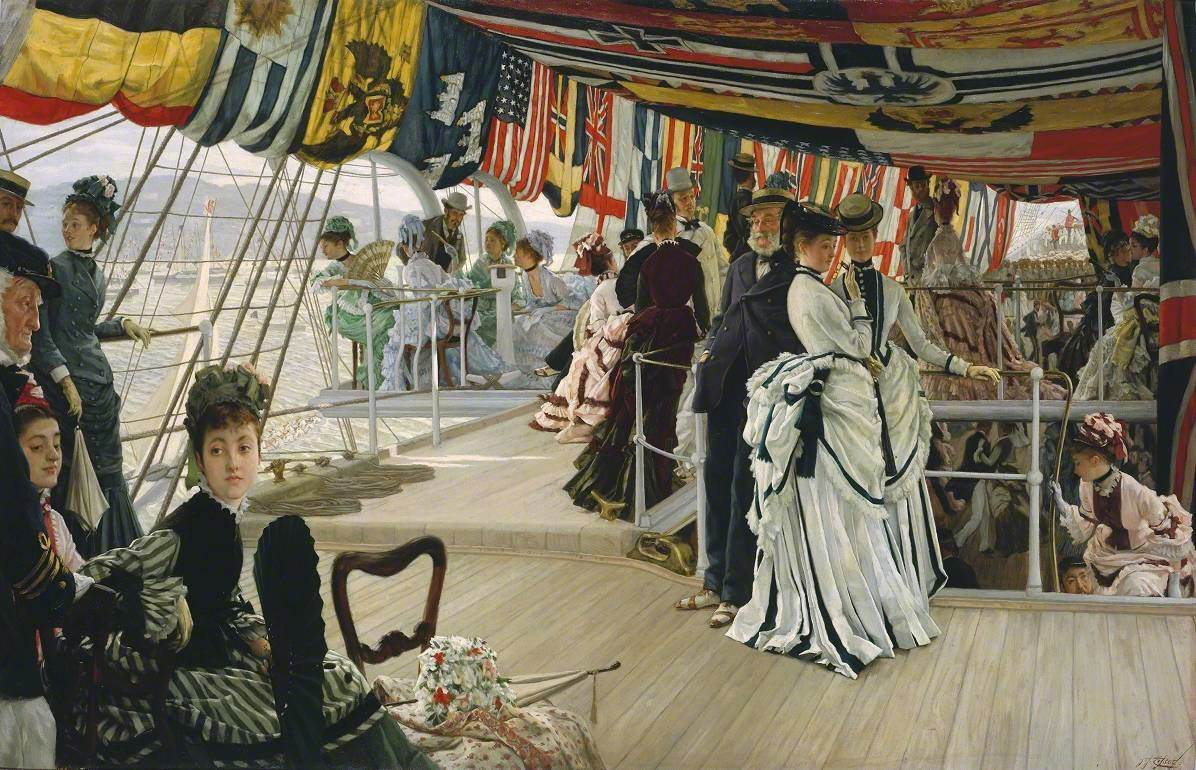
The Ball on Shipboard by James Tissot, originally exhibited in 1874

Vanity by Frank Cadogan Cowper, originally exhibited in 1907

== Bibliography ==
- Goodman, Jean. AJ: The Life of Alfred Munnings. Erskine Press, 2019.
- Spalding, Frances. The Real and the Romantic: English Art Between Two World Wars Thames and Hudson, 2022.
