= Cantigny First Division Oral Histories Collection =

The Cantigny First Division Oral Histories are a collection of video oral history interviews with veterans of the 1st Infantry Division of the United States Army, commonly known as the Big Red One. The First Division was the first permanent division in the regular Army, and is recognized by its ability to improve battlefield performance through learning experiences and its exceptional “esprit de corps.”

The project preserves the memories of soldiers whose military service occurred around the globe. These oral histories provide first-hand resources for scholarly research in military history and US history. They address veterans’ experiences during the time periods of the Vietnam War, the Persian Gulf War, the Korean War, and the Cold War.

In 2008, Ball State University History professors Dr. Michael William Doyle and Dr. David Ulbrich trained Ball State University students in oral history techniques and military history. Under their supervision, students J. Chris Reidy, Steven Brown, and Rachel (Fulton) Coleman conducted interviews with forty First Division veterans residing in Indiana, Ohio, and Kentucky. The Ball State University Teleplex videotaped the interviews and they were transcribed by Ball State University Libraries staff.

High-definition video and transcripts of the interviews are available online via the Ball State University Libraries’ Digital Media Repository (DMR). The online video, Conversations across Generations: The Cantigny First Division Oral History Project Summer 2008, summarizes the project.

The Cantigny First Division Oral Histories project was funded by a grant from the Chicago-based McCormick Foundation with administrative support from the staff of the First Division Museum at Cantigny. Copies of the interviews and transcripts are also available at the Robert R. McCormick Research Center at the First Division Museum in Wheaton, Illinois. and Ball State University Libraries Archives and Special Collections in Muncie, Indiana.

== See also ==
- Digital Media Repository
- 1st Infantry Division (United States)
- Cantigny
- Ball State University
- Alexander M. Bracken Library
