= Forest Idyl =

1924 statue by Albin Polasek

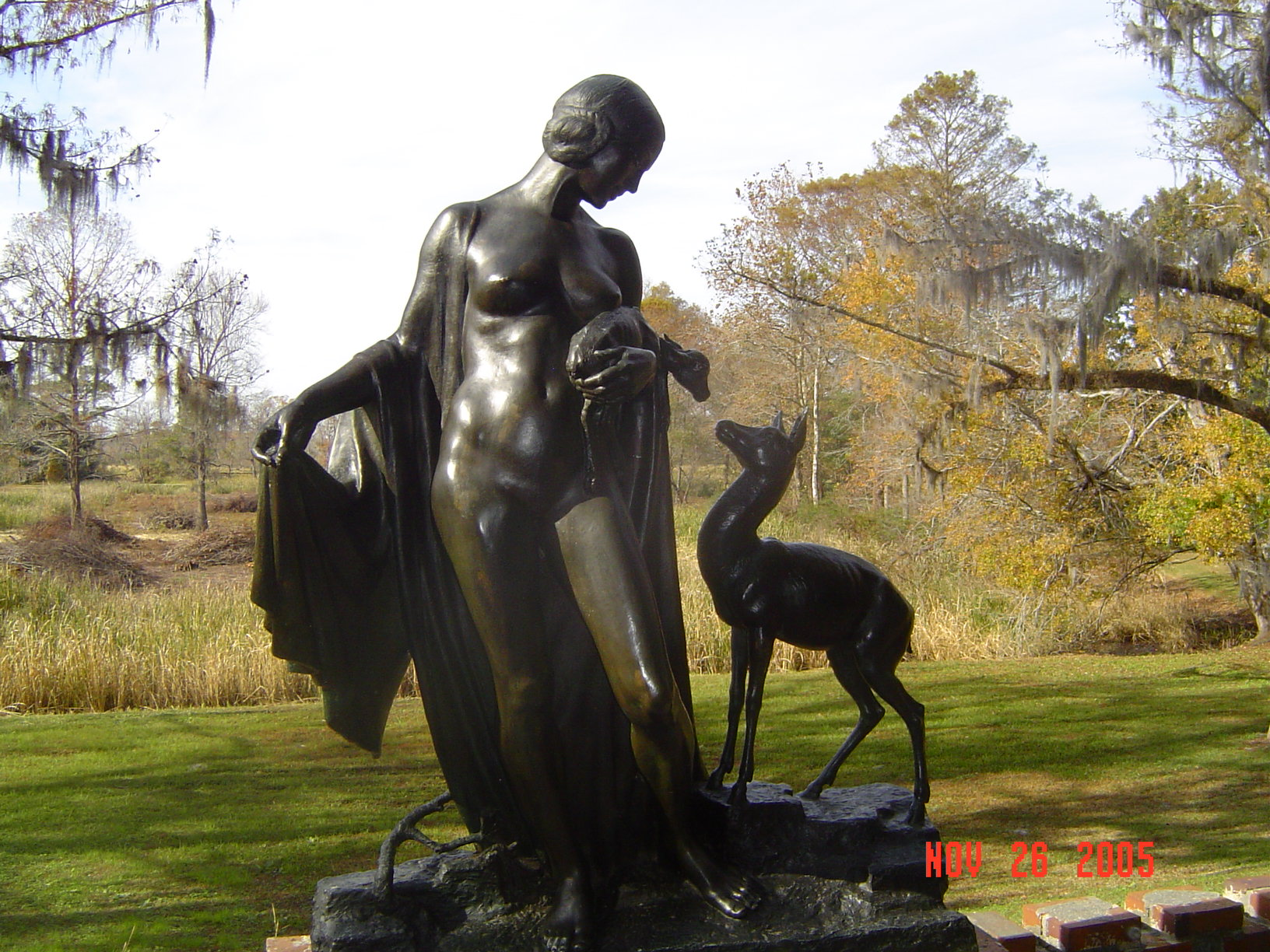
Forest Idyll at Brookgreen Gardens

Forest Idyl (sometimes spelled Forest Idyll, but originally titled "Idyl") is a bronze statue created in 1924 by Albin Polasek while he was head of the Sculpture Department at the Art Institute of Chicago. There are several copies of the three versions of this sculpture:

- Brookgreen Gardens in Murrells Inlet, South Carolina
- Muncie, Indiana, at Ball State University.
- Three in Winter Park, Florida, at the Albin Polasek Museum & Sculpture Gardens and at City Hall

== History ==
When the first version of Forest Idyl was made, it was created using the lost wax casting process, in which Polasek sculpted a model that was then cast in bronze by a foundry in New York called Roman Bronze Works. The piece was finished with a patina, a process overseen by Polasek. This essentially means that each Forest Idyll cast is an original Polasek work.

The piece depicts a nature scene, supposedly occurring in a forest, of a wood nymph mingling with two wild deer. This is the aspect of the piece that suggests the "Forest" part of its name. Merriam-Webster describes an "idyll" as "a work that deals with rustic life or pastoral scenes or suggests a mood of peace and contentment." Combined in the name Forest Idyl, these concepts evoke a peaceful scene taking place in a forest environment.

The particular piece that is Forest Idyl was first conceived by Polasek as "an Indian piping to two deer," but while he was in the process of working on it, it evolved into the statue as we know it today: a wood nymph holding a baby deer sniffing at a grown doe. This original version was actually only 26 inches tall. After several years, a request for a larger version was commissioned for Brookgreen Gardens in South Carolina, and that version still resides there, the catalyst for the other cast of the same size that was later produced.

Upon its release, Forest Idyl was very successful, receiving positive reviews, and was for sale at the Grand Central Art Galleries in New York City. A casting of this particular version was won in a drawing by Daniel Chester French, who wrote an appreciative letter to Polasek noting it as a "Charming-delightful piece of Sculpture which I Shall value not only for itself but as an example of the work of a man whom I value as a friend and respect very much as a sculptor."

== Artist ==
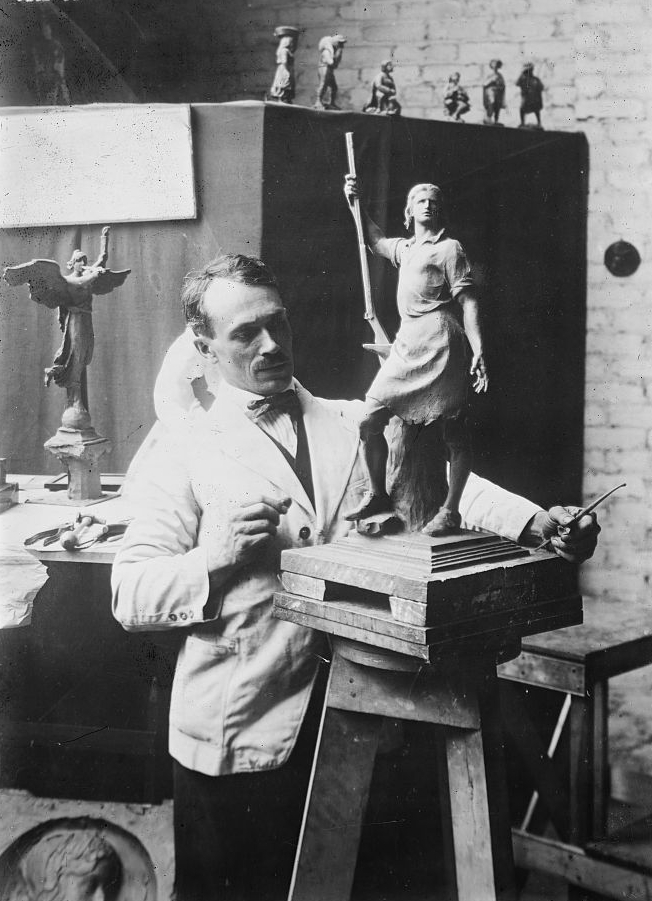
Albin Polasek

Albin Polasek, thought of as one of the most prominent sculptors of the twentieth century, was born on February 14, 1879, in Frenštát, Moravia (now within the Czech Republic) to Czech parents. He worked as a woodcarver in Vienna for four years before immigrating to the United States in 1901 at the age of 22. After arriving in the United States, he went to both Dubuque, Iowa, and LaCrosse, Wisconsin to carve wooden and stone statues for midwestern churches. He later attended The Pennsylvania Academy of the Fine Arts in Philadelphia, working under the guidance of sculptor Charles Grafly, and then was awarded a three-year Fellowship to the American Academy of Art in Rome. Later on, working as the head of the Department of Sculpture at the Art Institute of Chicago for 30 years, he committed his life to making and teaching art and was extremely grateful for his educational experience in America. He said:

"Through the opportunities that this country gave me, I started to carve out my destiny, to free myself from the rock so that I might be useful. No one knows the deep gratitude I feel for all that I have received. So if, as an immigrant, I have been able to contribute to some small part of American life, I know that I owe it to the opportunities this country has afforded me."

Due to his passion for and dedication to his art, Polasek created many well-known pieces throughout his lifetime. He won a number of awards for his sculptures such as the Stewardson Prize in 1906, the Prix de Rome competition in 1910, and the honor of being elected an Associate Member of the National Academy of Design in 1927 and promoted to Full National Academician status in 1933. Being so prestigious, he was employed by many to create public pieces that can still be found throughout Europe and America.

At the age of 70, Polasek retired and moved to Florida. There he met up with long-time friend, Ruth Sherwood, whom he married at the age of 71. Seven months before he and Sherwood married, Polasek had suffered a stroke, leaving his left side completely paralyzed. He spent the rest of his life in a wheelchair but was able to continue to draw, paint, model clay, and even carve stone with assistance. In October 1952, Ruth Sherwood died of throat cancer. In 1961, Polasek married Emily Muska Kubat, the widow of Dr. William Kubat, a fellow Czech who shared his love of art and culture.

Before his death on May 19, 1965, Polasek and his wife, Emily, set up the Albin Polasek Foundation, featuring 200 of his 400 works of art, and opened his estate to the public.

=== Art style ===
Polasek first worked as a woodcarver, but transitioned to many other mediums such as stone, bronze, clay, plaster, and oils when he attended Pennsylvania Academy of the Fine Arts.

His main goal, when sculpting, is said to have been to impart the beauty of motion, and he believed that the basic form of a piece must be constructed by the movement of the figure being sculpted. Because of this, he avoided using decoration to hide structure, and attempted to make his sculptures as lifelike as possible by giving them flowing characteristics to make them seem as if they had just been moving, and as if they could begin again at any time. This is certainly apparent within the pyramidal structure of Forest Idyl. Since Polasek is also known for making pieces based on the structure of nature, it is no surprise that Forest Idyl follows suit, depicting a woman mingling with deer in a forest setting.

Many of his pieces echo the styles of other works such as those by Auguste Rodin, who moved away from reality in his early period and whose style was more concerned with monumental expression than with character, or Michaelangelo, whose style reflected exaggerated poses and idealized the human form. A good amount of Polasek's influences come from his Catholic background, and approximately one third of all his works are religious pieces. Other influences include folklore themes, as he showed an interest in preserving old Czech and Slovakian myths, legends, and heroes.

Another trait of Polasek's work is his emphasis on all perspectives of a sculpture being important. He favored pieces that presented one side to the viewer above all others, but felt that the other sides played a part as well, and once had an argument with another artist on the topic. The other sculptor claimed that a piece should be sculpted to present only one side to the viewer, and that the rest of the sides were, more or less, useless. As a retort to the sculptor's later comment that it is impossible to make the ends of a flat composition interesting, Polasek sculpted a piece entitled "Aspiration," for which he won the Widener Gold Medal in 1915, which demonstrates that all sides of a sculpture can be interesting.

== Background and locations ==
There are currently at least four known castings of Forest Idyl located in different areas of the United States.

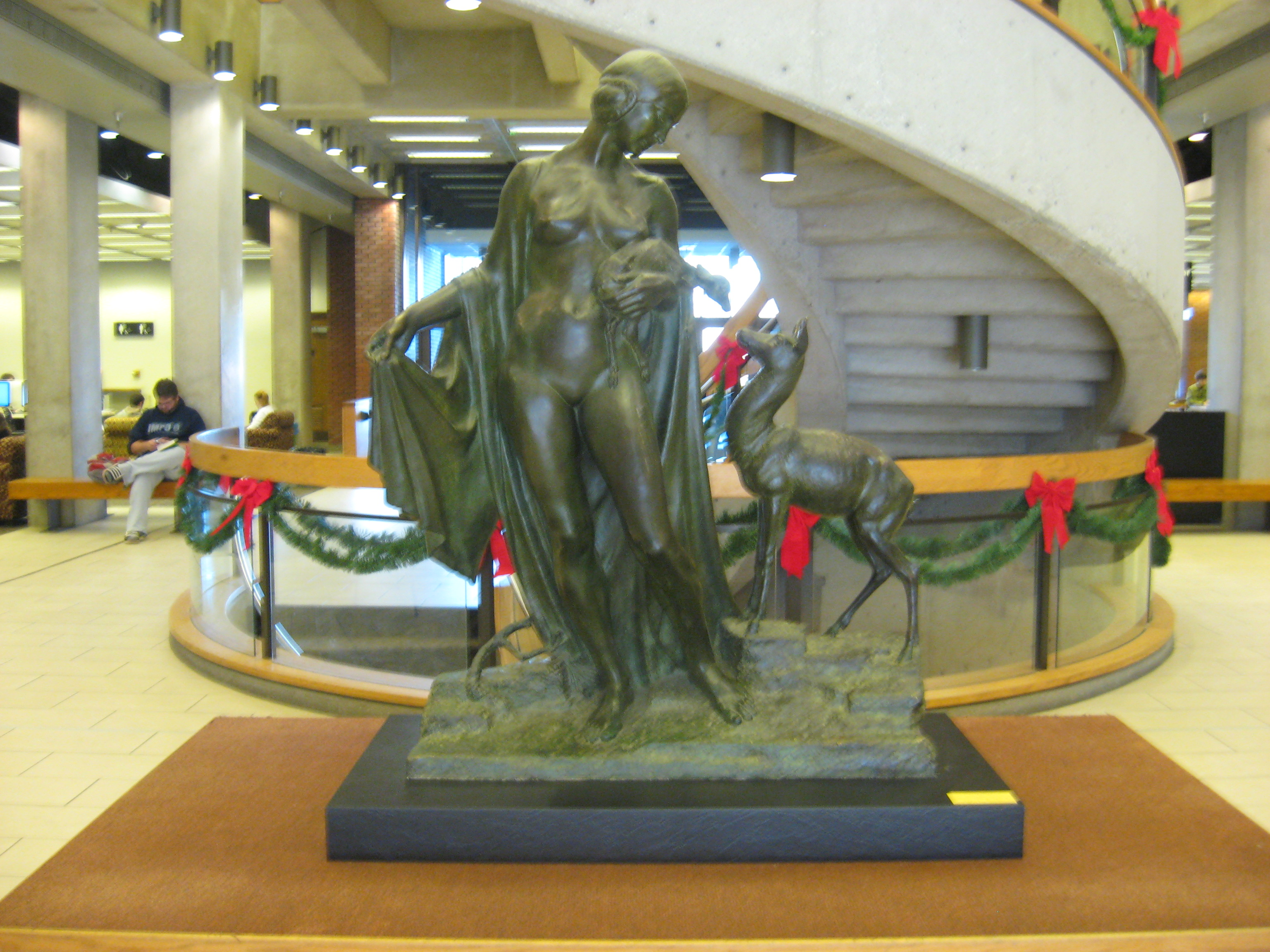
Forest Idyl in Bracken Library at Ball State University

The 1930 version of Forest Idyl is located at Ball State University in Muncie, Indiana. More commonly known as "The Naked Lady" by Ball State students, this statue is displayed in the lobby of Bracken Library near the south entrance. This copy is set apart from the others in the fact that it still has most of its original green patina, a film covering the surface of the statue. It still holds this characteristic because it is displayed indoors, away from the corrosive effects of weather damage. Ball State acquired the Forest Idyl from Frank C. Ball, one of the five Ball Brothers who founded the university. The statue is currently on loan from the David Owsley Museum of Art, and is used as a location for students to converge to work as a group or just to meet for any occasion. Notes are often left around the statue to inform other Ball State students of meeting times and locations. The marble base of the statue has a plaque that has the following inscription:

"Forest Idyll 1930 Albin Polasek Lent by the David Owsley Museum of Art Ball State University Frank C. Ball Collection Gift of the Ball Brothers Foundation"

Another Forest Idyl statue, located in Murrells Inlet, South Carolina at Brookgreen Gardens, was ordered by the famous sculptor, Anna Hyatt Huntington, and her husband, Archer Milton Huntington, after seeing the smaller 1924 version at a gallery in New York City. Polasek sculpted this version in 1930 while serving as a visiting professor at the American Academy in Rome, and used gazelles from a Roman zoo as models for the deer in the piece. This rendition is the same as the one that resides in Bracken Library.

The Albin Polasek Museum and Sculpture Garden in Winter Park, Florida also contains a copy of the 1924 version, and another version is on display at City Hall in Winter Park, Florida.
