= Still Life with Mirror =

1934 lithograph by M.C. Escher

- Artist: M. C. Escher
- Year: 1934
- Type: lithograph
- Dimensions: 39.4 cm × 28.7 cm (15.5 in × 11.3 in)

Still Life with Mirror is a lithograph by the Dutch artist M. C. Escher which was created in 1934. The mirror mingles together two unrelated spaces: the outside world of a narrow street in Villalago, a small town in Abruzzi, and the internal world of the bedroom. This work is closely related to his later use of similar incongruity in Still Life and Street, 1937. Escher manipulates the scale in different parts of the print to achieve the effect of smooth connection between worlds.
