= Fred Torrey =

American sculptor

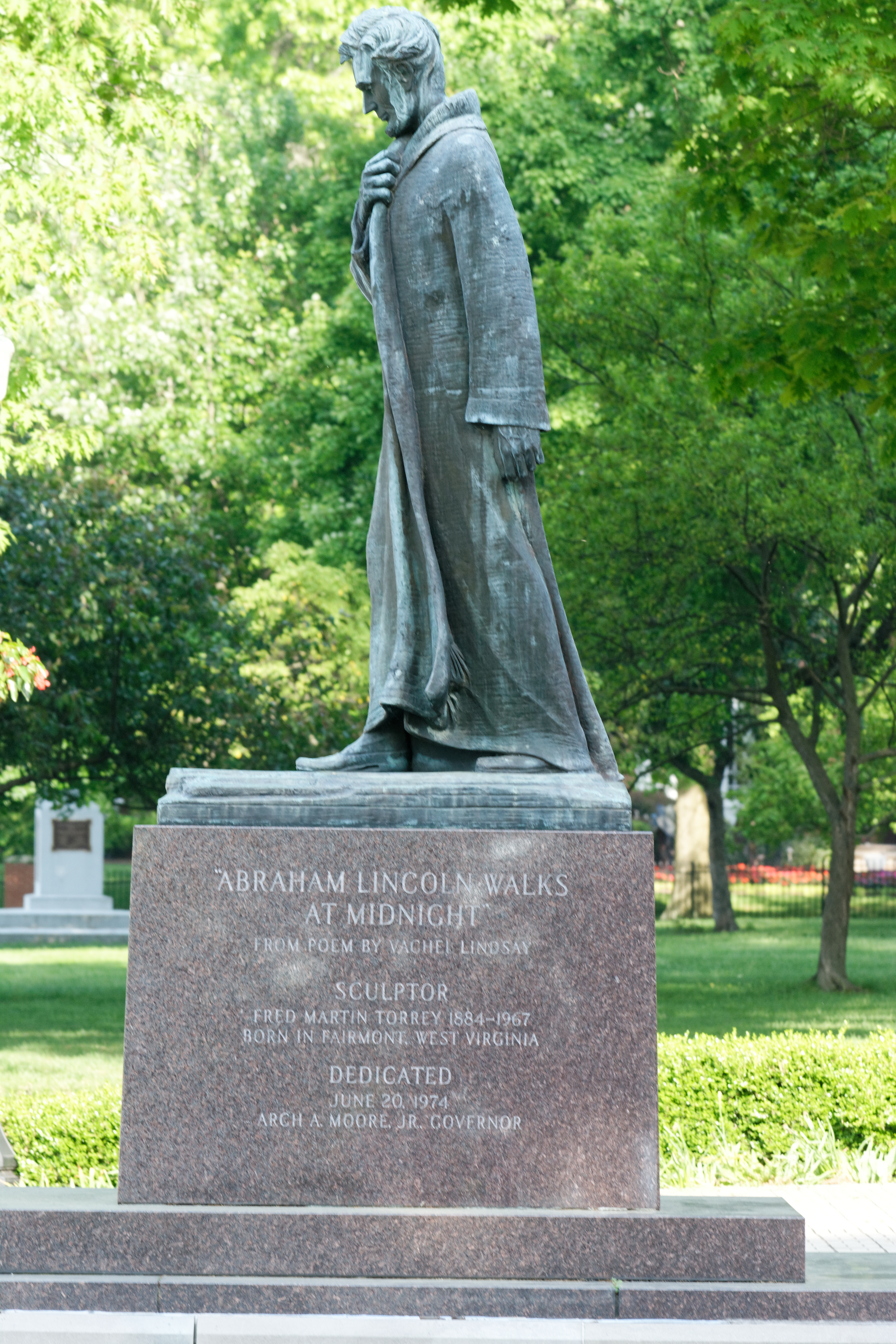
Lincoln Walks at Midnight

Fred Martin Torrey (January 29, 1884 – July 1967) American sculptor known for his monuments and architectural sculpture. His wife, Mabel Landrum Torrey (1886–1974) was also a recognized sculptor, who worked with her husband on some commissions.

== Biography ==
Fred Martin Torrey was born on January 29, 1884, in Fairmont, West Virginia. He attended the School of the Art Institute of Chicago where he studied sculpture under Charles J. Mulligan. After college he apprenticed under sculptor Lorado Taft.

Torrey sculpted historic figures, including Abraham Lincoln, Stephen Douglas, George Washington, John F. Kennedy, and George Washington Carver.

He died on in July 1967 in Ames, Iowa and is buried at the Ames Municipal Cemetery.

== List of works ==
- 1st Company Massachusetts Sharpshooters Monument (1913), Gettysburg Battlefield, Gettysburg, Pennsylvania
- 333 North Michigan Avenue Building (1929), architectural sculpture, Chicago, Illinois
- Heald Square Monument, Chicago, Following sculptor Lorado Taft’s 1936 death, the sculpture that he had been commissioned to create was completed by his associates Leonard Crunelle, Nellie Walker, and Fred Torrey.
- Abraham Lincoln Walks at Midnight, at the West Virginia State Capitol
- Moses, the Giver of the Law (1930) and Socrates, the Interpreter of the Law (1930), Hinds County Courthouse, Jackson, Mississippi
- Bestor Plaza Fountain (1947), found in the Chautauqua Institution Historic District, Chautauqua, New York
