= Portrait of Merle Oberon =

Painting by Gerald Brockhurst

- Artist: Gerald Brockhurst
- Year: 1937
- Type: Oil on canvas, portrait painting
- Dimensions: 85.7 cm × 73.7 cm (33.7 in × 29.0 in)
- Location: Private collection

Portrait of Merle Oberon is a 1937 portrait painting by the British artist Gerald Brockhurst. It depicts the Indian-born British actress Merle Oberon. It was one of a group of glamorous female sitters he depicted during the era including Marlene Dietrich and Wallis Simpson. Oberon had emerged as a major film star during the 1930s appearing in a string of hits produced by Alexander Korda who she subsequently married. Brockhurst began the work while she was preparing for her role as Messalina in the epic film I, Claudius at Denham Studios. Due to injuries she shuffered from a car accident, the production was completely abandoned. While she was recovering from surgery Brockhurst continued to paint her and finished the portrait in time to be displayed at the Royal Academy Exhibition of 1937 held at Burlington House in London. The painting, which Oberon had commissioned for £2,000, featured alongside Thomas Cantrell Dugdale's of the musical star Jessie Matthews. In 2018 it sold at auction for $360,500, a record for a work by Brockhurst.

== Bibliography ==
- Brumbaugh, Thomas B., Ladis, Andrew & Phagan, Patricia. The Art of Gerald Brockhurst Georgia Museum of Art, University of Georgia, 1993.
