= Hinds County Courthouse (Jackson, Mississippi) =

Historic courthouse in Mississippi, US

- U.S. National Register of Historic Places
- Mississippi Landmark
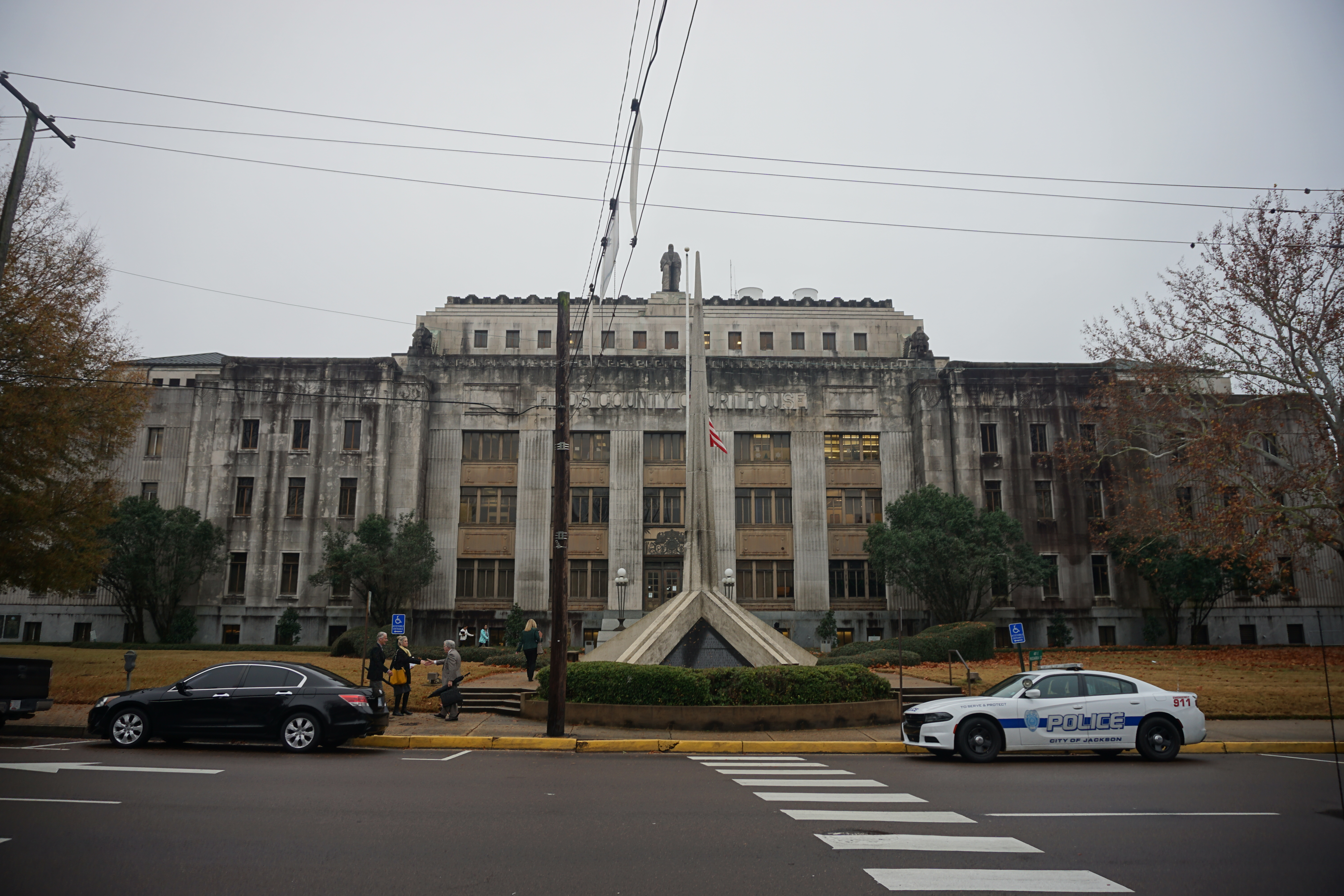

- Location within Mississippi
- Location: Pascagoula St., Jackson, Mississippi, U.S.
- Coordinates: 32°17′48″N 90°10′58″W
- Area: 0.7 acres (0.28 ha)
- Built: 1930
- Architect: Claude H. Lindsley, Fred M. Torrey
- Architectural style: Art Deco
- NRHP reference No.: 86002125
- USMS No.: 049-JAC-0195-NR-ML

Significant dates
- Added to NRHP: July 31, 1986
- Designated USMS: March 5, 1986

The Hinds County Courthouse is a historic county courthouse building in Jackson, Mississippi. The Art Deco building is listed on the National Register of Historic Places since July 31, 1986; and is a Mississippi Landmark since March 5, 1986.

The courthouse was enlarged with wings on both sides. It has two statues by Fred Torrey of Chicago on its roof, Moses, the Giver of the Law (1930) and Socrates, the Interpreter of the Law (1930). It is located next to the detention center, built in 1977.

== See also ==
- National Register of Historic Places listings in Hinds County, Mississippi
