= Ophelia (Brockhurst) =

Painting by Gerald Brockhurst

- Artist: Gerald Brockhurst
- Year: 1937
- Type: Oil on canvas, portrait painting
- Dimensions: 102 cm × 81 cm (40 in × 32 in)
- Location: Royal Academy, London

Ophelia is a 1937 oil painting by the British artist Gerald Brockhurst. It depicts his muse Kathleen Woodward, nicknamed Dorette, as the character Ophelia from William Shakespeare's tragedy Hamlet.

Brockhurst displayed the painting at the Royal Academy Exhibition of 1937 held at Burlington House in Piccadilly. When he was elected to full membership to the Royal Academy the following year he chose to submit the picture as his diploma work.

== Bibliography ==
- Brumbaugh, Thomas B., Ladis, Andrew & Phagan, Patricia. The Art of Gerald Brockhurst Georgia Museum of Art, University of Georgia, 1993.
- Hawkins, Jennifer & Hollis, Marianne.

Thirties: British Art and Design Before the War. Arts Council of Great Britain, 1979.
