= Vanity (painting) =

Painting by Frank Cadogan Cowper

- Artist: Frank Cadogan Cowper
- Year: 1907
- Type: Oil on canvas, allegorical painting
- Dimensions: 57.1 cm × 38.1 cm (22.5 in × 15.0 in)
- Location: Royal Academy, London

Vanity is a 1907 oil painting by the British artist Frank Cadogan Cowper. An allegorical work it depicts a portrait of an attractive young woman which draws on the tradition of Italian Renaissance painting. She is shown covered in jewellery and with a hand-mirror to symbolise her vanity. Cadogan Cowper is often grouped with the second generation of Pre-Raphaelites.

The painting was originally displayed at the Royal Academy Exhibition of 1907 at Burlington House in London. After Cadogan Cowper was elected to full membership of the Royal Academy he was required to submit a diploma work and chose this painting. The picture was again exhibited at the Royal Academy Exhibition of 1937.

== Bibliography ==
- Anderson, Gail-Nina (ed.) Heaven on Earth: The Religion of Beauty in Late Victorian Art. : Djanogly Art Gallery, 1994.
- Pal-Lapinski, Piya. The Exotic Woman in Nineteenth-century British Fiction and Culture: A Reconsideration. University of New Hampshire Press, 2005.
