= The Ball on Shipboard =

Painting by James Tissot

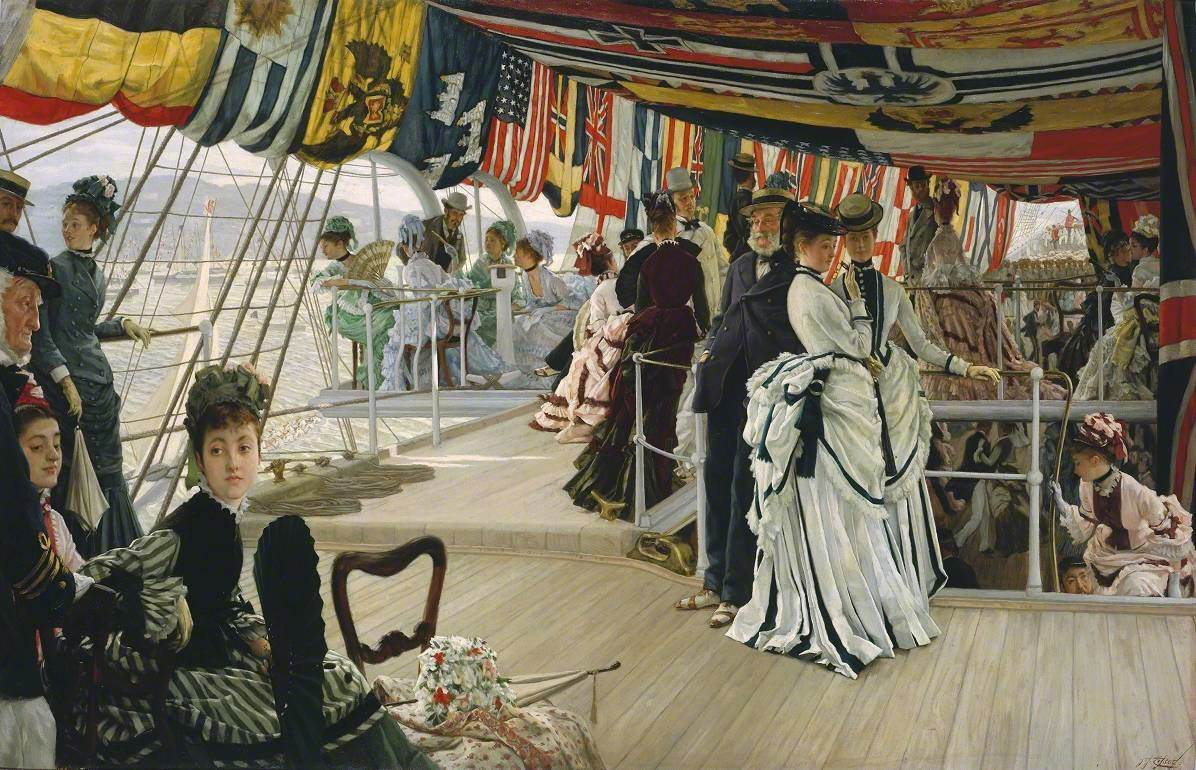
- Artist: James Tissot
- Year: 1874
- Type: Oil on canvas, genre painting
- Dimensions: 129.5 cm × 84.1 cm (51.0 in × 33.1 in)
- Location: Tate Britain, London

The Ball on Shipboard is an oil painting on canvas by the French artist James Tissot, from 1874. It is held at the Tate Britain, in London.

== History and description ==
It shows a scene on the deck of a ship, festooned with flags during a regatta held off the Isle of Wight. Several national flags are visible. A ball is in progress featuring members of high society. Although Tissot drew on the idea of fashionable gatherings on the royal yacht, the lady by the rail in the straw hat is not Alexandra, Princess of Wales as was once believed.

At The Times, on July 1874, it was stated that "...he has set himself the difficult task of representing the scene on board a man of war at Spithead, converted into a ball-room by an awning lined and fringed with flags... the grace of the girls, the taste of their toilettes, and the capital characterisation of the gentlemen, young and old, yachtsmen and man-of-war officers, cannot be praised too highly."

Tissot had settled in London following the Franco-Prussian War. The picture was displayed at the Royal Academy Exhibition of 1874 held at Burlington House in Piccadilly, one of three works he displayed. It was once in the possession of Alfred Munnings. The painting is in the Tate Britain, having been acquired via the Chantrey Bequest in 1937 and was displayed at the Royal Academy Exhibition of 1937.

== Bibliography ==
- Marshall, Nancy Rose & Warner, Malcolm. James Tissot: Victorian Life, Modern Love. Yale University Press, 1999.
- Robins, Anna Gruetzner & Thomson, Richard. Degas, Sickert, and Toulouse-Lautrec: London and Paris, 1870-1910. Tate Publishing, 2005.
- Wrightsman, Jayne. The Wrightsman Pictures. Metropolitan Museum of Art, 2005.
