= Beneficence (statue) =

Statue in Muncie, Indiana, U.S.

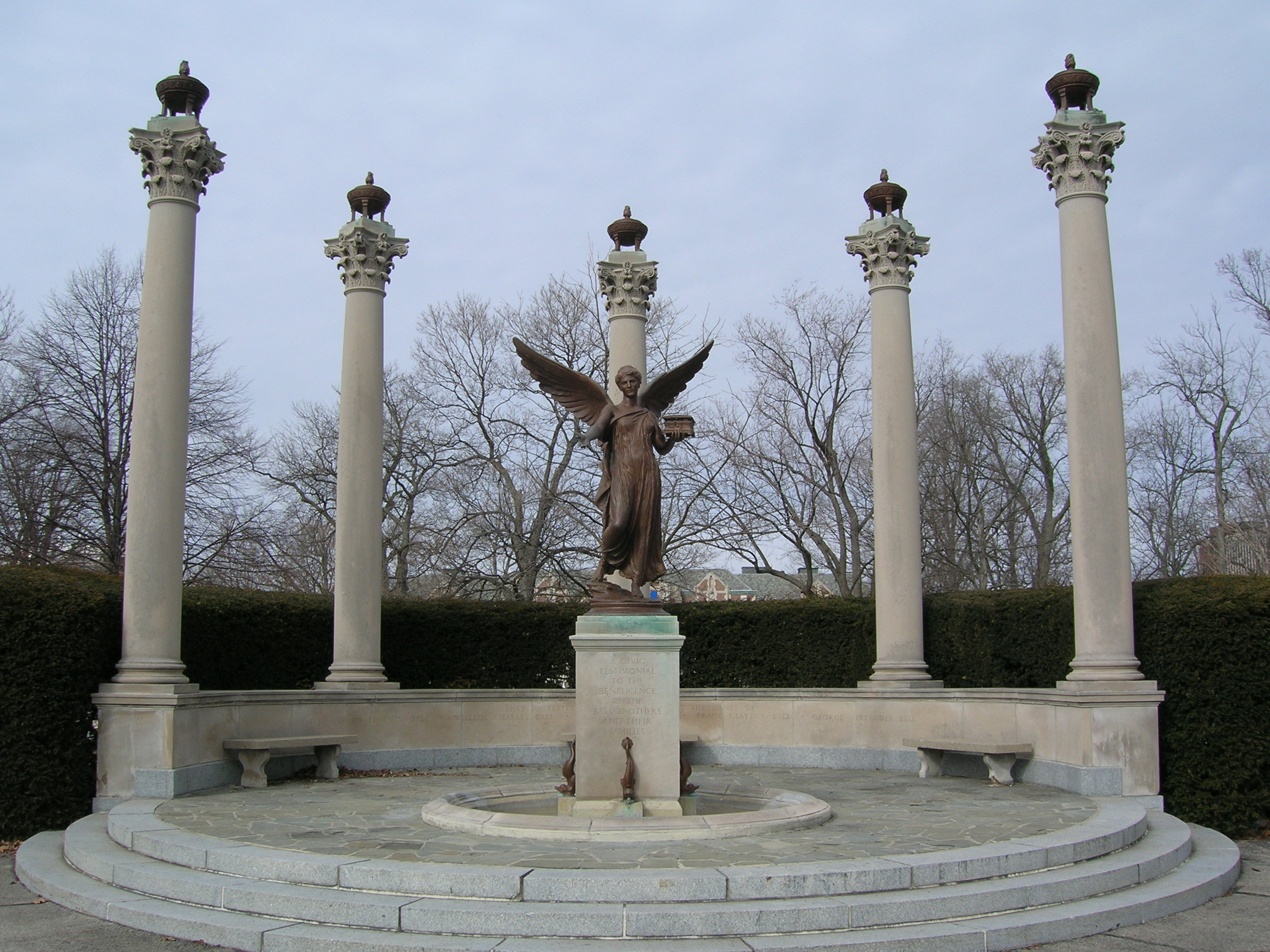
- Beneficence and colonnade
- 40.198272°N 85.410278°W
- Location: Old Quad; Ball State University
- Designer: Daniel Chester French (Statue); Richard Henry Dana (Promenade)
- Type: Memorial Statue
- Material: Bronze
- Opening date: 1937
- Website: www.bsu.edu/map/landmarks/beneficence

Beneficence is a 1937 bronze statue on the campus of Ball State University, located in Muncie, Indiana, United States. The statue, by sculptor Daniel Chester French, is referred to as Benny by students.

== History ==
In 1927, the Muncie Chamber of Commerce proposed building a memorial to express gratitude on behalf of Muncie and Ball State University for the Ball Brothers' extensive generosity to the community. The monetary value of the Balls' philanthropies in Muncie totaled $7 million by the monument's completion in 1937.

The Chamber commissioned renowned sculptor Daniel Chester French, who sculpted the statue of Abraham Lincoln in the Lincoln Memorial in Washington, D.C. Beneficence was chosen for the statue because it aptly described the feelings of the community and the actions of the Ball Brothers. French entrusted architect Richard Henry Dana to choose a location for the statue and to design the surrounding promenade.

The price tag for Beneficence, completed in 1930, was approximately $50,000. The progress toward installation crawled during the Great Depression as funds for the project became scarce. More than 11,000 individuals, including children, donated money to assist in completing the memorial, and Beneficence was dedicated on September 26, 1937. Sealed inside the Beneficence is a book containing all donors who contributed to the memorial's completion. Although the project was the last for French, neither he nor Dana lived to see its dedication. The statue, affectionately known as Benny, symbolizes the selflessness of the five brothers in their service to the community. It is so entwined in the university's culture that its image is part of the school seal.

Beneficence's hand stretches to welcome new students to campus. The treasure box she holds in her other arm represents the treasure education can offer. Her wings represent the flight into the world when students graduate. The five Corinthian columns behind the statue represent the Ball Brothers, for whom the university is named.

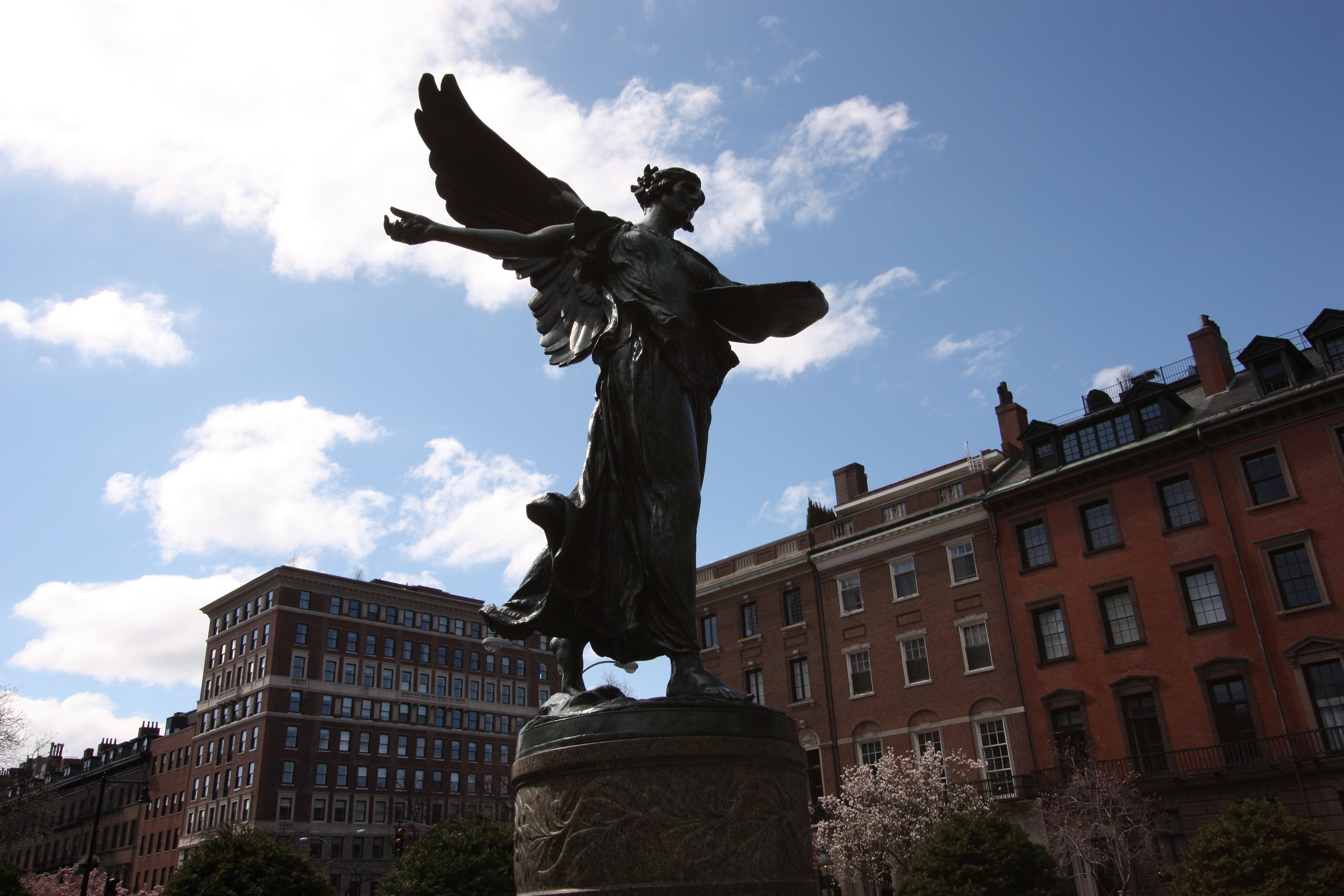
Angel of the Waters

Beneficence resembles earlier examples of French's work, such as Angel of the Waters, part of a memorial to businessman and philanthropist George Robert White in the Boston Public Garden in Boston, Massachusetts, and The Spirit of Life in Saratoga Springs, New York. The model for The Spirit of Life statue was Audrey Munson, so it is said that Munson was referenced for Beneficence.

In the same year Beneficence was dedicated, 1937, Daniel Chester French's protege, Edith Barretto Stevens Parsons, cast another famous statue on campus, the Frog Baby Fountain.

== Campus lore ==
Some students believe one way to find true love is to sit under Benny and kiss them with closed eyes. If Benny's wings flap, then the love is true; if no flapping occurs, then the love is not meant to be. Another myth suggests that the severed heads of each of the five Ball Brothers rest in individual urns on the top of the respective pillar. Another legend states that a female student is not officially a coed until she is kissed by a male student beneath the statue. Another campus myth states if a virgin were ever to cross Benny's path, she would come to life and fly away.

== See also ==
- Public sculptures by Daniel Chester French
