= Ajax (painting) =

Painting by John Steuart Curry

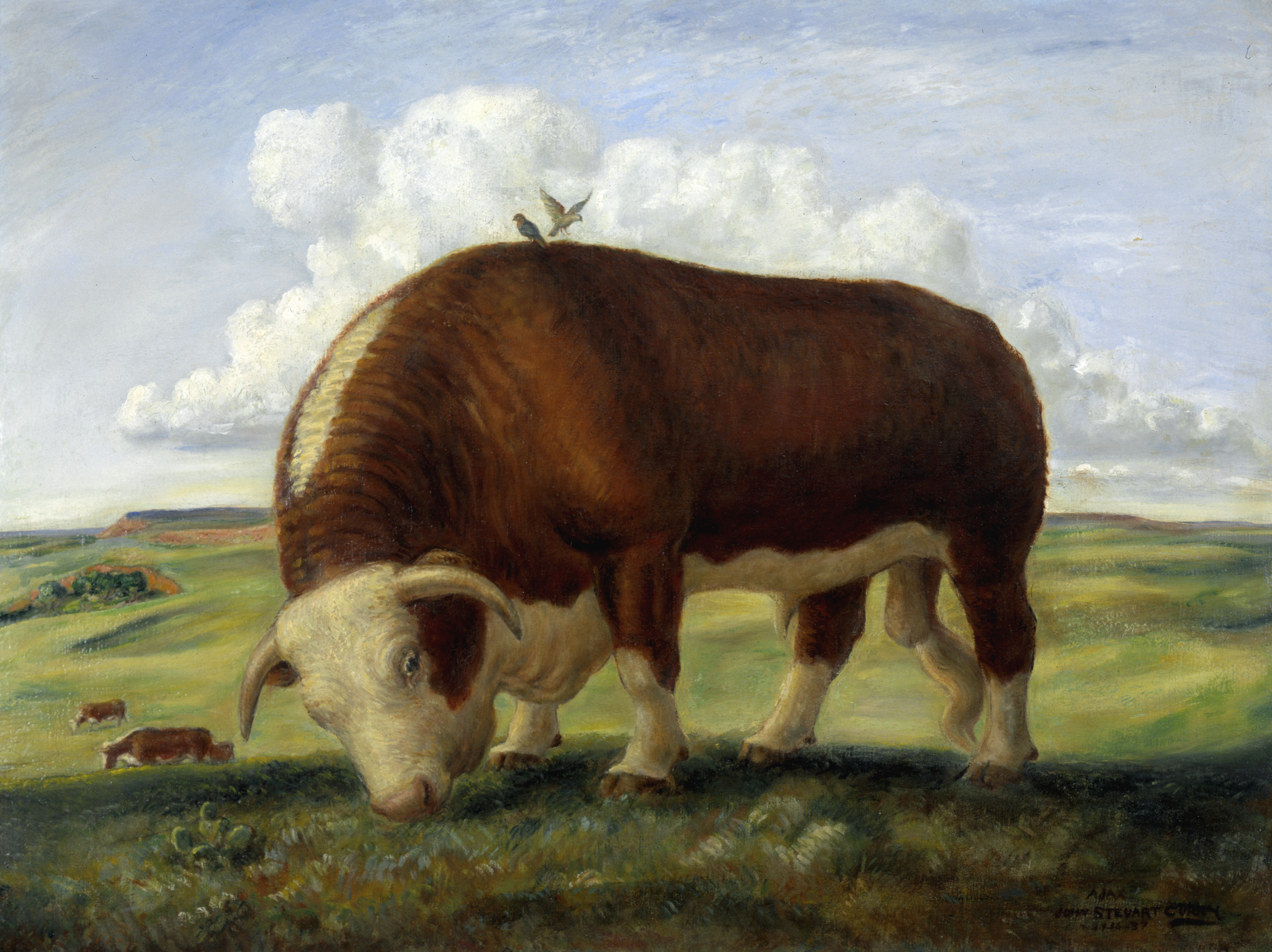
- Artist: John Steuart Curry
- Year: 1936–1937
- Medium: Oil on canvas
- Dimensions: 92 cm × 122.5 cm (36 1/4 in × 48 1/4 in)
- Location: Smithsonian American Art Museum; Washington, D.C.

Ajax is an oil-on-canvas painting by the American artist John Steuart Curry, created in 1936–1937. It depicts a well-fed Hereford bull with two cowbirds on his back. The painting is on view at the Smithsonian American Art Museum, in Washington, D.C.

== Creation ==
The painting was made with the intention to reassure Americans after the Dust Bowl years. According to Curry's friend Reginald Marsh, it was really a self-portrait.

== Legacy ==
Curry featured Ajax the bull in several of his works, such as the mural Kansas Pastoral. The subject also became a target for mockery among those who opposed regionalist painting and considered it superficial. The satirist Marshall Glasier mocked both Ajax and Curry's position at the University of Wisconsin with his 1948 painting John Steuart Curry and the University of Wisconsin Bull-Breeding Machine.

Marianne Moore mentions Ajax in her poem "The Buffalo".

== See also ==
- List of artwork by John Steuart Curry
