= Bracken Library =

Academic library in Muncie, Indiana, U.S.

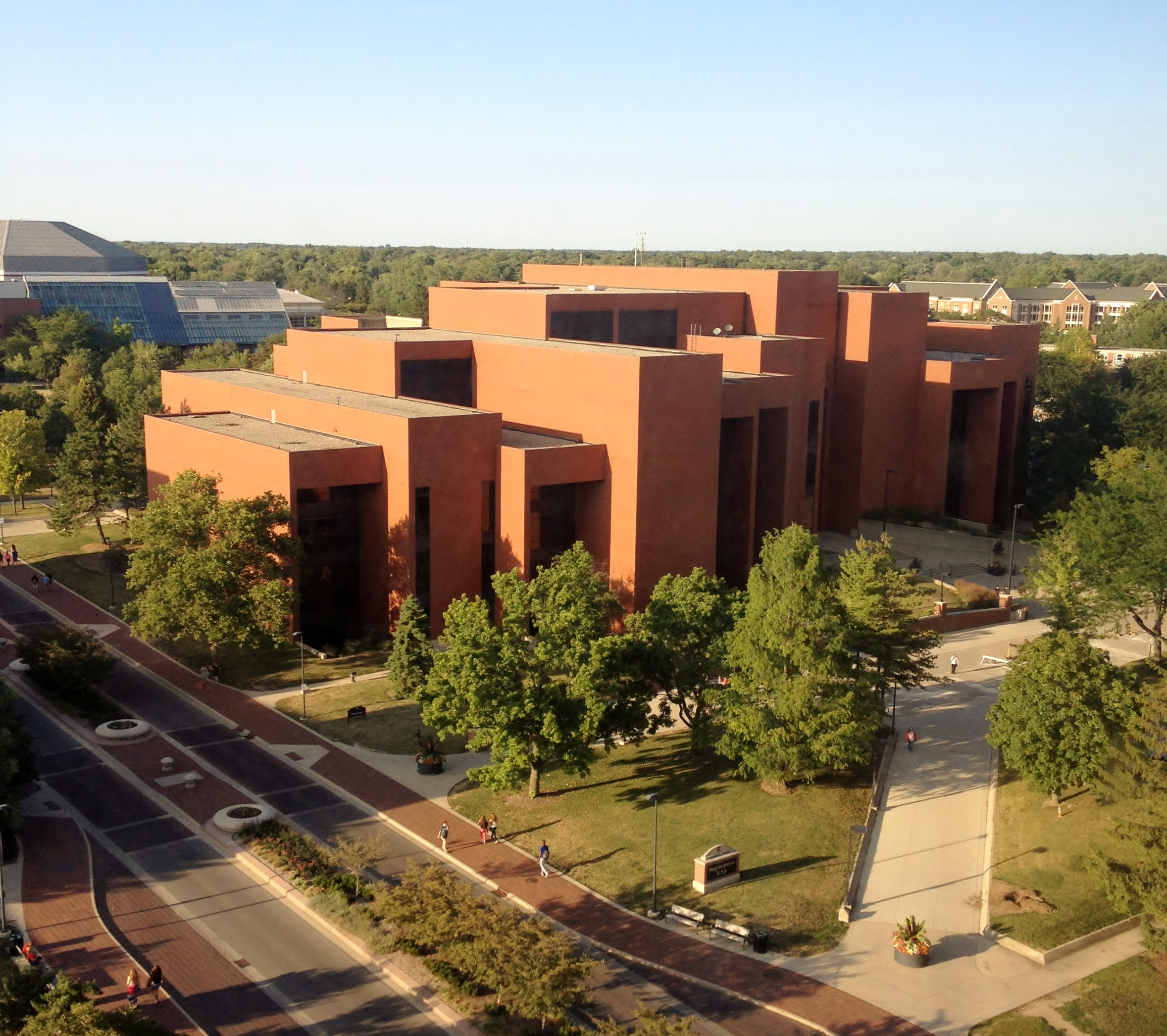
- Bracken Library in 2014

General information
- Type: Library
- Architectural style: Brutalist
- Location: Muncie, Indiana, U.S.
- Coordinates: 40.202461°N 85.407182°W
- Named for: Alexander M. Bracken
- Completed: 1975

Design and construction
- Architects: Walter Scholer & Associates; The Perkins and Will Partnership, Chicago

Website
- www.bsu.edu/library/

The Alexander M. Bracken Library is the main library on the campus of Ball State University in Muncie, Indiana, United States. Opened in September 1975 and designed by Walter Scholer and Associates and the Perkins and Will Partnership of Chicago, the 320,000-square-foot facility is located in the geographic center of the Ball State University campus and is distinguishable for its unique, Brutalist architecture.

The main collection of Ball State's University Libraries, the Bracken Library holds a collection of over of 1.5 million print volumes, over 2,900 periodical subscriptions, over 1 million microforms, nearly 98,000 government documents, and over 120,000 maps as well as audiovisual materials, music scores, and archival resources. In addition, Bracken Library visitors have online access to scholarly literature, learning objects, and primary sources though over 65 electronic research databases including the Digital Media Repository and Cardinal Scholar Institutional Repository which provide access to digitized archival resources and Ball State scholarly works. On average, the library receives more than 4,500 visitors per day to access collections materials, participate in instruction sessions and consultations, and use technology resources.

The library is named for Alexander M. Bracken, Muncie lawyer and philanthropist who served as a member of the State Teachers College Board and the Ball State University Board of Trustees from 1954 to 1980 who “was instrumental in Ball State’s rapid growth in the decades following World War II.”

A casting of Albin Polasek's Forest Idyll is displayed on the first floor lobby of Bracken Library. The sculpture serves as a popular meeting place for students and is colloquially referred to as "The Naked Lady."

== History ==
On May 24, 1972, ground was broken on the new library building and on February 20, 1974, the Ball State University Board of Trustees voted unanimously to name the new library for Alexander M. Bracken to honor his years of service to Ball State University. During August 1975, moving crews transported over 700,000 books and thousands of periodicals, government documents, and other resources to Bracken Library from what is now the North Quadrangle Building, the previous home to the library's collections.

On September 9, 1975, Bracken Library first opened to patrons. On March 26, 1976, Bracken Library was formally dedicated; Stephen K. Bailey, vice president of the American Council on Education, gave the principal address at the ceremony. Ball State University Special Collections and the John Steinbeck Collection were also dedicated on that day in a special ceremony attended by Elaine Steinbeck, widow of John Steinbeck, and Elizabeth R. Otis, Steinbeck's literary agent.

On May 14, 1977, the Friends of the Alexander M. Bracken Library was organized to generate financial support and goodwill for Ball State University Libraries.

In 1987, Bracken Library patrons first gained access to the university's automated card catalog and circulation system.

In 2001, films and videos on DVD first became available for checking to Bracken Library patrons, and in 2003, laptops, projectors, and digital cameras became available for borrowing.

The Helen B. and Martin D. Schwartz Special Collections and Digital Complex in Bracken Library was dedicated on August 17, 2009. The collaborative and interactive learning and teaching space accommodates instruction, research, and programming activities at Bracken Library.

== Resources ==
=== Archives and Special Collections ===
Ball State University Archives & Special Collections collects, preserves, and provides access to records of Ball State University's history, archival collections documenting Muncie and Delaware County history in the Stoeckel Archives of Local History, a collection of research materials on Muncie as Middletown, rare books and literary manuscripts, and special collections.

Prominent collections in Archives & Special Collections include the papers of Parliamentarian and Nobel Peace Prize winner Sir Norman Angell and the papers of former United States Congressman Philip Sharp.

Archives & Special Collections also houses over 1,000 volumes and 25 cubic feet of manuscript material documenting the work and career of author John Steinbeck.

=== Educational Technology and Resources Collection ===
Educational Technology and Resources provides patrons access to resources to support teaching and instruction including digital equipment and technology, DVDs, audiobooks, textbooks, youth books, and classroom teaching materials. Digital equipment circulated by the department includes laptops, digital cameras, portable hard drives, microphones, and chargers and cables.

=== GIS Research and Map Collection ===
The GIS Research and Map Collection offers access to the GIS software and to online GIS tutorials, datasets, online mapping applications, and in-house GIS data. The collection also offers access to a traditional map collection that includes and has available for circulation over 145,000 maps, atlases, charts, gazetteers, and other cartographic resources.

=== Music collection ===
The music collection contains musical scores, books on music and music recordings, with more than 17,000 CDs in a wide variety of genres as well as a collection of music reference materials. The collection also provides access to Finale 2014 music notation software that facilitates the arranging and composing of music.

== Related resources and collections ==
In addition to materials housed in Bracken Library, the Ball State University Libraries also provides patrons access to materials in the Architecture Library, the Drawings and Documents Archive, and the Science-Health Science Library.

=== Architecture Library ===
Housed in Ball State University's Architecture Building, the Architecture Library provides access to 27,000 books, over 100 periodical subscriptions, and nearly 300 audio visual resources on the subjects of architecture, landscape architecture, urban planning, and historic preservation. The Architecture Library also includes the Visual Resources Collection that provides access to collections of architecture images and building material samples.

=== Drawings and Documents Archive ===
A collecting area of Archives & Special Collections housed in Ball State University's Architecture Building, the Drawings and Documents Archive document's the history of Indiana's built environment. Available through this collection are over 120,000 architectural drawings, landscape plans, photographs, models, and other architectural records.

Included in the collection are archival records from the Pierre & Wright architectural firm, the Vonnegut & Bohn architectural firm, and prominent African American architect Edwin A. Gibson.

=== Science-Health Science Library ===
Located in Ball State University's Cooper Science Complex, the Science-Health Science Library provides access to a collection of reference and circulating books in the areas of chemistry, physics, geology, nursing, biology, and physiology. Patrons of this library also have access to over 80 scientific journal titles as well as teaching materials and audio-visual resources.
