= Mabel Landrum Torrey =

American sculptor

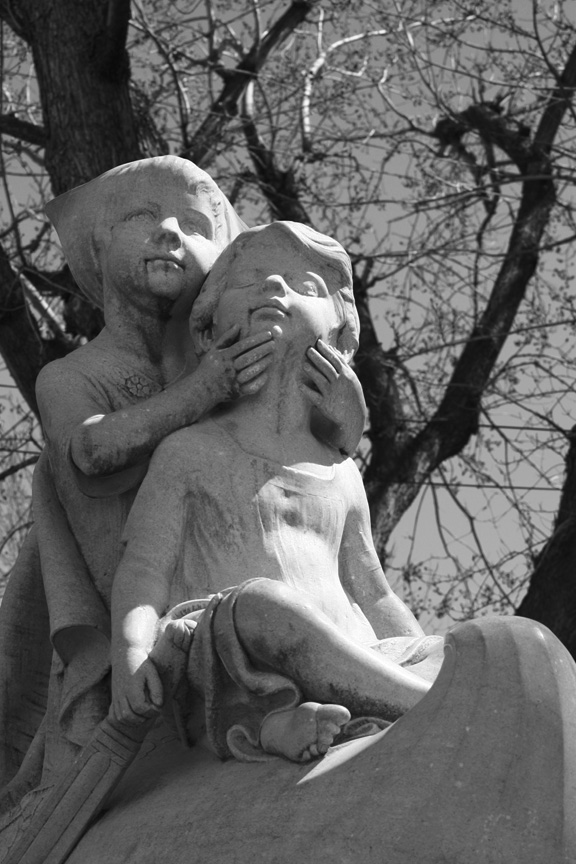
- Torrey's Wynken, Blynken and Nod Fountain in Denver, Colorado
- Born: Mabel Landrum; June 23, 1886; Sterling, Colorado, U.S.
- Died: April 1, 1974 (aged 87); Ames, Iowa, U.S.
- Education: Art Institute of Chicago
- Known for: Sculpture
- Spouse: Fred Torrey

Mabel Landrum Torrey (June 23, 1886 – April 1, 1974) was an American sculptor best known for her statuettes and sculptures of children. A number of her works were inspired by the poetry of Eugene Field.

== Early life and education ==
Torrey was born in a sod-roofed house in Sterling, Colorado in 1886. Her father was a local judge. She studied at the Colorado State College of Education where one day an art teacher looked at a bust she was modeling and said, "You are a sculptor." She then worked as a schoolteacher in her hometown of Sterling. Upon saving enough money, however, she traveled to Chicago to study sculpture at the School of the Art Institute of Chicago (SAIC) in 1912. Her teachers there included sculptor Charles Mulligan. The training provided at SAIC was strongly classical, and focused on "diligent training until one could manipulate clay into idealized human forms that conveyed abstract concepts."

In 1916, she married Fred Torrey, who was also a student in sculpture at SAIC. They moved into Lorado Taft's Midway Studios. At that time Torrey taught modeling at the Francis Parker School). The Torreys' only child, Elizabeth Jane Torrey, was born on October 5, 1920. "Betty", as she was called, was to serve as the model for at least 14 of Torrey's sculptures. The Torreys resided at Midway Studios until the artist's colony dissolved in 1947.

== Artistic career ==
Torrey received her first major commission from the Mayor Robert W. Speer of Denver, Colorado in 1918. The resulting work, the "Wynken, Blynken and Nod Fountain", was dedicated in 1919 in Denver's Washington Park. The sculpture, which was based on the Eugene Field poem "Dutch Lullaby", remains a major Denver landmark. In the 1930 edition of his History of American Sculpture, Lorado Taft described the fountain as Torrey's most important work.

Unlike her husband, Torrey did not become an "associated artist" of Taft's Midway Studios. She nonetheless maintained a steady stream of sculpture commissions while also lecturing actively.

Torrey also produced numerous statuettes based on her sculptures. When the Torreys moved to Des Moines, Iowa at their daughter's urging in 1957, Torrey was able to turn this into a profitable business by connecting with a local manufacturer of art porcelain.

Torrey's final sculpture, dedicated in 1961, was a collaboration with her husband, and one of the few sculptures on which the two collaborated. Commissioned by the Iowa group "Friends of Lincoln," it depicts Abraham Lincoln reading to his son Tad. The sculpture of the father was done by Fred Torrey, while the sculpture of Tad was done by Mabel.
