= Hermann Otto Hoyer =

German painter (1893–1968)

- Born: January 25, 1893; Bremen, German Empire
- Died: May 30, 1968 (aged 75); Oberstdorf, West Germany
- Known for: Painting

Hermann Otto Hoyer (1893-1968) was a German painter. He was injured in World War I and fitted with a prosthesis hand. He joined the Nazi Party in 1931 and served as a deputy local group leader. He withdrew from public political activity in 1934 but continued to create Nazi-inspired paintings.

== Life ==
Hermann Otto Hoyer completed an apprenticeship as a glass painter and enrolled at the Dresden School of Arts and Crafts in 1914. He was a participant in the First World War and went into the field with the 1st Hanseatic Infantry Regiment No. 75. Hoyer was wounded in the First Battle of the Marne in 1914 and was taken prisoner of war by the French for three years. He made four escape attempts, including from a penal camp in Tunisia, to which he had been transferred in the meantime. During the last escape in October 1917, he lost his right arm and was exchanged for Germany. Even in his last station as a prisoner of war, he received painting utensils "through the concession of a French sub-physician", which enabled him to paint.

Due to his war disability, he trained to paint with his left hand. Hoyer was fitted with a prosthesis by the Berlin surgeon Ferdinand Sauerbruch. At the Munich Academy, where he enrolled in drawing at the end of May 1919, he was a pupil of Hermann Groeber, Carl von Marr and Franz von Stuck.

From 1925 until his death, he lived in Oberstdorf in the Allgäu and joined the Nazi Party on 1 January 1931 (membership number 386,683). In the meantime, he acted as deputy local group leader and at the end of April 1933 was one of ten new members of the Nazi Party municipal council as an "artist known beyond the borders of Oberstdorf". However, he caused a stir several times, for example with the statement "that there are also decent Jews" and with the question of confidence during a party meeting, which as a democratic instrument violated the Führer principle and ultimately led to his withdrawal from the post of deputy local group leader.

This, however, had no effect on his work and reputation as a painter. Hoyer created numerous politically influenced paintings and, from 1940 onwards, mainly peasant paintings. In 1943, he was awarded the title of professor.

After the Second World War, in December 1948, he was classified by the Kempten Appeals Chamber as a follower within the meaning of Control Council Directive No. 38 on the basis of the Law for the Liberation from National Socialism and Militarism.

He was credited with not harming anyone, withdrew from all public political activity in 1934 and was married in church in 1936.

== Works ==
The oil painting The SA Man was erected in 1932 in the Brown House, the party headquarters of the Nazi Party in Munich. His painting Fuchstobel in the Snow, painted in 1933, was purchased by the Minister-President of Bavaria Ludwig Siebert for the Christmas exhibition "Art for All" (Munich, 1935). It is part of the holdings of the Bavarian State Painting Collections in the Pinakothek der Moderne, but is not on display (as of May 2020).

Later, as part of the Große Deutsche Kunstausstellung of 1937 at the Haus der Deutschen Kunst in Munich, the painting Am Anfang war das Wort ("In the beginning was the word"), which is one of the "best-known depictions of Hitler as an orator", followed. Together with around 400 other works of art from the Nazi era that are considered "politically charged", it is still in the possession of the United States Army. Regarding the basic background and the scene depicted in the picture, which measures 191.8 cm × 270.5 cm, Marlies Schmidt wrote:

Hermann Otto Hoyer placed the formation of the Nazi movement under Hitler on a metaphysical level with a title that quoted the opening sentence of the Gospel of John [...]. Hitler appears in front of a group of listeners in the pose of orator, seer and guide, which had also been developed in the 1920s in a binding manner for the type of Lenin depictions in Soviet Russia.

For the Charité's exhibition "On a Knife's Edge" about Ferdinand Sauerbruch, which lasted a good ten months from the end of March 2019 to the beginning of February 2020, Hoyer's 1922 painting Ferdinand Sauerbruch during a chest wall operation was chosen as the motif for the front of the six-page flyer.

== Reception ==
In the context of the 2016 exhibition "Artige Kunst", in which "desirable art under National Socialism" was contrasted with "degenerate art", Sabine Oelze judged for Deutsche Welle that the "art of the Nazi regime" was stylistically "far behind the currents of the time" and that "artists such as Hermann Otto Hoyer resorted to a clumsy and falsifying realism". In addition, pictures such as the Farmer's Meal show the "mendacious imagery of the National Socialists", which has "nothing to do with the reality of the time". The taz said that rural idylls like von Hoyer are "not at all openly propagandistic". Michael Meyer (Märkische Allgemeine Zeitung) called the picture a "bourgeois naïve village idyll". Michael Meyer (Märkische Allgemeine Zeitung) nannte das Bild eine „bürgerlich naiv inszenierte Dorfidylle“.

A good two years later, Hoyer's Peasant Meal itself served as a contrast as part of the exhibition "Construction of the World – Art and Economy – 1919 to 1939 and 2008 to 2018" at the Kunsthalle Mannheim: the "Peasant Meal suitable for the Third Reich" was "spoilsported" by Vladimir Vasilyev.
