= Edwin A. Gibson =

American architect (1926–2011)

Edwin Arthur Gibson
- Born: June 2, 1925; Cumberland, Maryland
- Died: November 20, 2011 (aged 86); Indianapolis, Indiana
- Occupation: Architect
- Known for: Indiana's first registered African American Architect, Ed Gibson & Associates, Inc., Indiana's first African American State Architect

Edwin Arthur Gibson (June 2, 1926 – November 20, 2011) was an American architect active in Indianapolis, Indiana from 1946 to 2002. His career was one of many firsts. Gibson was the first registered African American architect in the State of Indiana, first African-American architect to be appointed Indiana's State Architect, and first African-American architect in Indiana to own his own firm. His long career included work in both the public and private sector. Gibson overcame many obstacles to become successful and was generous in offering advice and helping younger architects achieve similar success.

== Personal life ==
Gibson was born on June 2, 1925, in Cumberland, Maryland, and as a youth he moved to Indianapolis, Indiana, where he graduated from Crispus Attucks High School. He went on to graduate from University of Illinois where he received a Bachelors and Masters of Science in Architectural Engineering. Gibson married Mary E. Gibson, and together they had two sons. Gibson died in Danville, Indiana on November 20, 2016. He was buried in Crown Hill Cemetery in Indianapolis, Indiana.

== Practice ==
His long career, which spanned from 1945 to 2002, included work in both the public and private sectors. He started at the venerable A. M. Strauss Associates, Inc., a Fort Wayne architecture firm, where he became a partner and treasurer in the firm. He later moved to Indianapolis to start his own firm. In 1962, Gibson won the Governor's Award for Outstanding Achievement, a year later, in 1963 he was appointed as Indiana State Architect, a position he held for two years, leaving in 1965 to work for Chas. W. Cole & Son, as the Architect-Director in charge of the Indianapolis office. The same year, the Indiana Society of Architects, AIA, honored Gibson with a recognition of meritorious service, which was presented to him on October 8, 1965. In December 1963, Gibson was honored with the Sagamore of the Wabash, one of Indiana's highest civilian awards, bestowed by Governor Matthew E. Welsh in recognition of his pioneering contributions to architecture and public service in the state.

Gibson opened his own firm (Ed Gibson & Associates, Inc.), a general architecture and engineering company, in 1968. The company was in operation until 1986 when he dissolved the company, and left to work exclusively for Methodist Hospital. After leaving Methodist Hospital, Gibson worked as a consulting architect until his retirement in 2002. Some of the buildings he designed or renovated were located at Methodist Hospital in Indianapolis, Evansville State Hospital, Central Elementary in Plainfield, Broad Ripple Library, renovations at Central Library in Indianapolis, IUPUI, IU Bloomington, including renovation of Ernie Pyle Hall, Hudnut Plaza, and other HUD projects throughout Indiana.

When Gibson closed his private practice in 1987 to work exclusively for Methodist Hospital, most of the drawings in his office were discarded and those in this archival collection are the few examples of his work that remain. Shortly after his death in 2011, his family gave an additional donation of photographs and papers, including his Master of Science thesis, awards, and certificates to the Ball State University Drawings and Documents Archive. The family also donated Gibson's personal tape measure engraved with his initials, which can be viewed in the digital collection.

== Works ==
- Arsenal Technical School 1500 East Michigan Avenue, Indianapolis, IN, c.1970s
- Broad Ripple Library, Broad Ripple Avenue, Indianapolis, IN, 1984
- Century Towers, 100 North Court Street, Sullivan, IN, 1981
- Methodist Hospital, West Building, North Senate Avenue, Indianapolis, IN, c.1970s
- Indianapolis Central Library Renovation, 40 East St. Clair Street, Indianapolis, IN, 1977
- Evansville State Hospital, 150 bed Residential Care Unit, 3400 Lincoln Avenue, Evansville, IN, c.1970s
- Herron Art Museum Building Renovation, 735 West New York Street, Indianapolis, IN c.1970
- Central Elementary School, Plainfield, IN, c.1970s
