= After the Race (painting) =

Painting by Alfred Munnings

- Version in Southampton City Art Gallery
- Artist: Alfred Munnings
- Year: 1937
- Type: Oil on canvas, genre painting
- Dimensions: 99 cm × 129.6 cm (39 in × 51.0 in)
- Location: Southampton City Art Gallery, Hampshire

After the Race is a 1937 oil painting by the British artist Alfred Munnings. It depicts the aftermath of a horse race held at Cheltenham Racecourse. The painting was innovative in its break in tradition by showing the period after the race rather than its duration. Munnings was intrigued by the subject and produced four different versions of the composition.

The original painting was displayed at the Royal Academy Exhibition of 1937 held at Burlington House in London and a sketch for a different version at the 1938 edition. A version was acquired in 1937 by Southampton City Art Gallery in Hampshire with funds from the Chipperfield Bequest. In 2009 Southampton Council proposed selling the painting, reported to be worth as much as £4 million, and an Auguste Rodin sculpture valued at £1.5 million in order to fund the new Titanic-focused museum. The idea was met with criticism and heavy opposition and was eventually abandoned. A separate version which was displayed at the Royal Academy in 1946 is now part of the collection of the Virginia Museum of Fine Arts.

== Bibliography ==
- Goodman, Jean. AJ: The Life of Alfred Munnings. Erskine Press, 2019.
