= Mask of a Weeping Woman =

Sculpture by Auguste Rodin

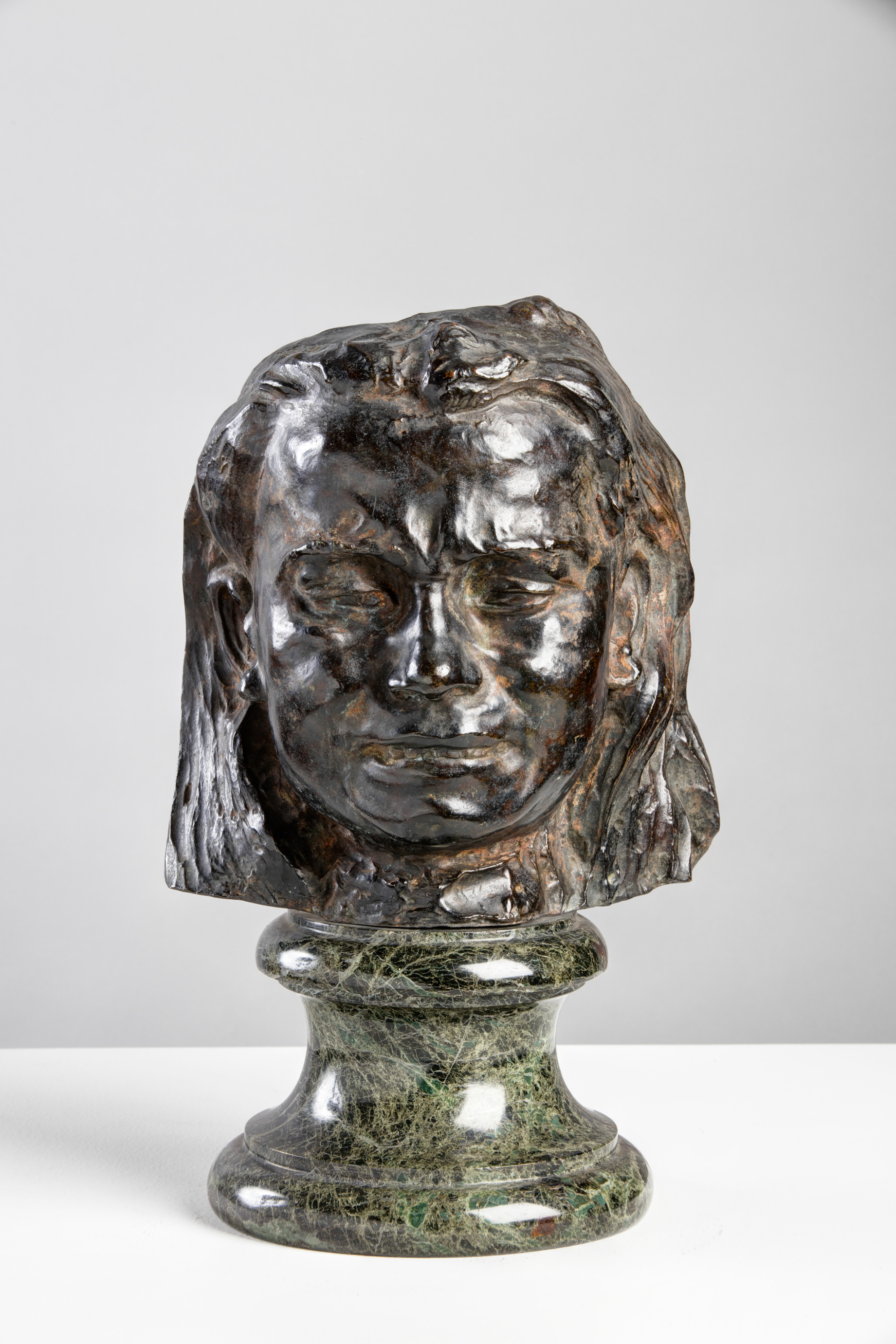
- A bronze version of the work at the Museo Soumaya
- Artist: Auguste Rodin
- Year: 1885

Mask of a Weeping Woman is a sculpture by Auguste Rodin, initially produced as a pair with Weeping Woman for the first version of his The Gates of Hell in 1885. The two pieces were intended to appear on the centre of each panel. They were later moved by Rodin himself, who instead placed Mask on the lower part of the left panel.

== Description ==
In his 1909 retrospective catalogue of his own works, Rodin described this pair of works as a "face violently creased with sadness and torn by bitter tears and dishevelled hair". He merged her hair with the uneven surface representing her neck, which may suggest that the work was not intended to depict a figure from history of Ovid's Metamorphoses as Truman Bartlett supposed. It is different from Rodin's traditional style at that time and differs from his Mask of Pain, anticipating instead his Hanako series of 1907.

Rodin exhibited a new version of the work at Georges Petit's gallery, created for Edmond Lachenal in memory of a woman.

== See also ==
- List of sculptures by Auguste Rodin
