= Thomas Aquinas Daly =

American painter

Thomas Aquinas Daly (b. 1937) is an American contemporary landscape and still life painter.

== Early life ==
Daly was born March 27, 1937 in Niagara Falls, New York, and graduated from Bishop Duffy High School (now Niagara Catholic High School) in 1955. Educated as a graphic artist at the University at Buffalo, Daly spent 23 years working in the commercial printing business before leaving it in 1981 to devote his full attention to painting.

== Career ==
Daly's work has been displayed in numerous solo exhibitions at galleries, museums and universities throughout the country. President Gerald R. Ford recognized Daly's talent by awarding him Grand Central Art Galleries' Gold Medal at the opening of his 1987 show in New York. In addition to painting, Daly has produced two books: Painting Nature's Quiet Places (Watson-Guptill, 1985) and The Art of Thomas Aquinas Daly: The Painting Season (1998).

His paintings have also appeared in several other publications, among them: The Ultimate Fishing Book, The Sweet of the Year, The Sporting Life, Atlantic Salmon Chronicles and The Art of Shooting Flying. Additionally his work has been featured in periodicals such as Gray's Sporting Journal, Arts Magazine, American Artist, Sports Afield, Sporting Classics, Wildlife Art News, Southwest Art, Western Art & Architecture, and Watercolor.

In 2021, Daly was awarded the Red Smith Award from the National Museum of Wildlife Art in Jackson Hole, Wyoming.

== Sources ==
- Daly, Thomas Aquinas; Daly, Christine A. (1998). The Art of Thomas Aquinas Daly: The Painting Season. Arcade: T.A. Daly Studio. ISBN 0-9663104-0-3.
- Daly, Thomas Aquinas (1985). Painting Nature's Quiet Places. New York: Watson-Guptill Publications. ISBN 0-8230-3724-X
