= Still Life with Old Shoe =

1937 oil painting by Joan Miró

- Natura morta del sabatot (Catalan)
- Artist: Joan Miró
- Year: 1937
- Catalogue: 80555
- Medium: Oil on canvas
- Dimensions: 81.3 cm × 116.8 cm (32.0 in × 46.0 in)
- Location: Museum of Modern Art; New York
- Accession: 1094.1969

Still Life with Old Shoe is a 1937 oil painting by Joan Miró, now part of the permanent collection of the Museum of Modern Art in New York City. The work was given to the museum by James Thrall Soby in 1969.

== History ==
At the start of the Spanish Civil War Miró spent some time at his house in Montroig del Camp but then left for France. On 16 December 1936 he arrived in Paris with his wife Pilar and daughter Maria Dolores. They lived in a very confined space with nowhere for Miró to work, so he simply noted down ideas on small cards. As he had done when he first went to Paris in 1920, Miró attended the drawing class at the Académie de la Grande Chaumiere.

As he still had no space of his own, Miró began to work in a corner of the gallery Pierre where, in the period January–May 1937, he produced one of his strangest and most important paintings, Still Life with Old Shoe, in which he expresses his anguish over the situation in Spain, with a detailed depiction of the rise of evil, invasion by monsters and the decline of the human figure.

Perhaps the events of the moment, especially the drama of the war in Spain, made me feel a need to penetrate reality. I worked from life every day at the Grande Chaumiere. At that time I felt a need to control things through realism

— Joan Miró

Miró sided with the Republicans. He showed his mural The Reaper at the Spanish pavilion of the Paris International Exhibition of 1937 where Picasso's famous Guernica was also exhibited. The Reaper, a large picture with a height of 5.5 m (18 ft), was lost after the pavilion was dismantled. In the same year Miró produced a poster with a powerful message in French: Aidez l'Espagne (Help Spain).

== Description ==
On the left there is an apple impaled by a fork, then a bottle, a loaf of bread and the shoe of the title. The main colours are black, red and acidic yellow, which symbolize an apocalyptic landscape, all in flames (the fire being actually outside the painting). This infernal sight is underlined by the shades in the horizon. The silhouettes of all objects can be clearly defined and the round-shaped lines of the whole composition create dynamism.

== Analysis ==
This painting is born in the context of Spanish Civil War. The anguish and fear of Miro are shown in the whole picture, the nightmare's type shapes of the objects and the flames, whose shadows are seen in the colours and tones of the objects and it's supposed to be in the spectator's side. This work is often compared to Picasso's Guernica, both because of its despair and of the nowadays consequences of any war. The shapes in the horizon look like dark clouds, forecasting the tragedy to come.

The objects chosen by Miro are deliberately poor and humble, tied to ordinary people's life: an old shoe, a little of food, some things found in any kitchen. They stand as a tragic symbol. Its huge size become a threat, reinforced by the contrast of colours and the ghostly light, which sometimes seem to emanate from the objects. Metamorphosis of the objects is one of the keys of this work and it is produced not only by the size but also by the use of blaze colours.

The author himself decided to follow a realistic style, since the struggles of war didn't allow anyone to escape through surrealist drawing as in previous works. The painting, then, doesn't show nor photographic nor fully abstract style, but a new mix of both, which Miro described as "profound and fascinating reality". This hybrid character extends to the genre, both a still life and a landscape.

The preparatory drawings, found in a piece of newspaper, tell that this work was intended to be a large pastel, related to the series of 1934. They are inspired by Van Gogh's work A Pair of Shoes.
