= The Beached Margin =

Painting by Edward Wadsworth

- Artist: Edward Wadsworth
- Year: 1937
- Medium: Tempera on linen
- Dimensions: 71.1 cm × 101.6 cm (28.0 in × 40.0 in)
- Location: Tate; London

The Beached Margin is a tempera on linen painting by the English painter Edward Wadsworth, from 1937. It depicts a beach still life where three poles in the sand are decorated with semi-abstract objects and geometrical shapes.

Wadsworth was part of the British modernist group Unit One. He was well travelled and, for a British artist at the time, unusually informed about the contemporary art currents in continental Europe. When painting The Beached Margin he was influenced by the Italian painter Giorgio de Chirico. Wadsworth told the magazine Cavalcade that this painting and Visibility Moderate (1934) were based on "fishermen's flag poles, whipped by a sand-raising wind, [seen] on Hastings beach".

The Beached Margin was painted with tempera on linen laid on panel. It is signed "E. Wadsworth 1937". It was purchased by the Tate Gallery in 1938. As of 2017, it was not on display.

== See also ==
- Metaphysical art
