= Frog Baby Fountain (Ball State University) =

Statue and fountain in Muncie, Indiana, United States

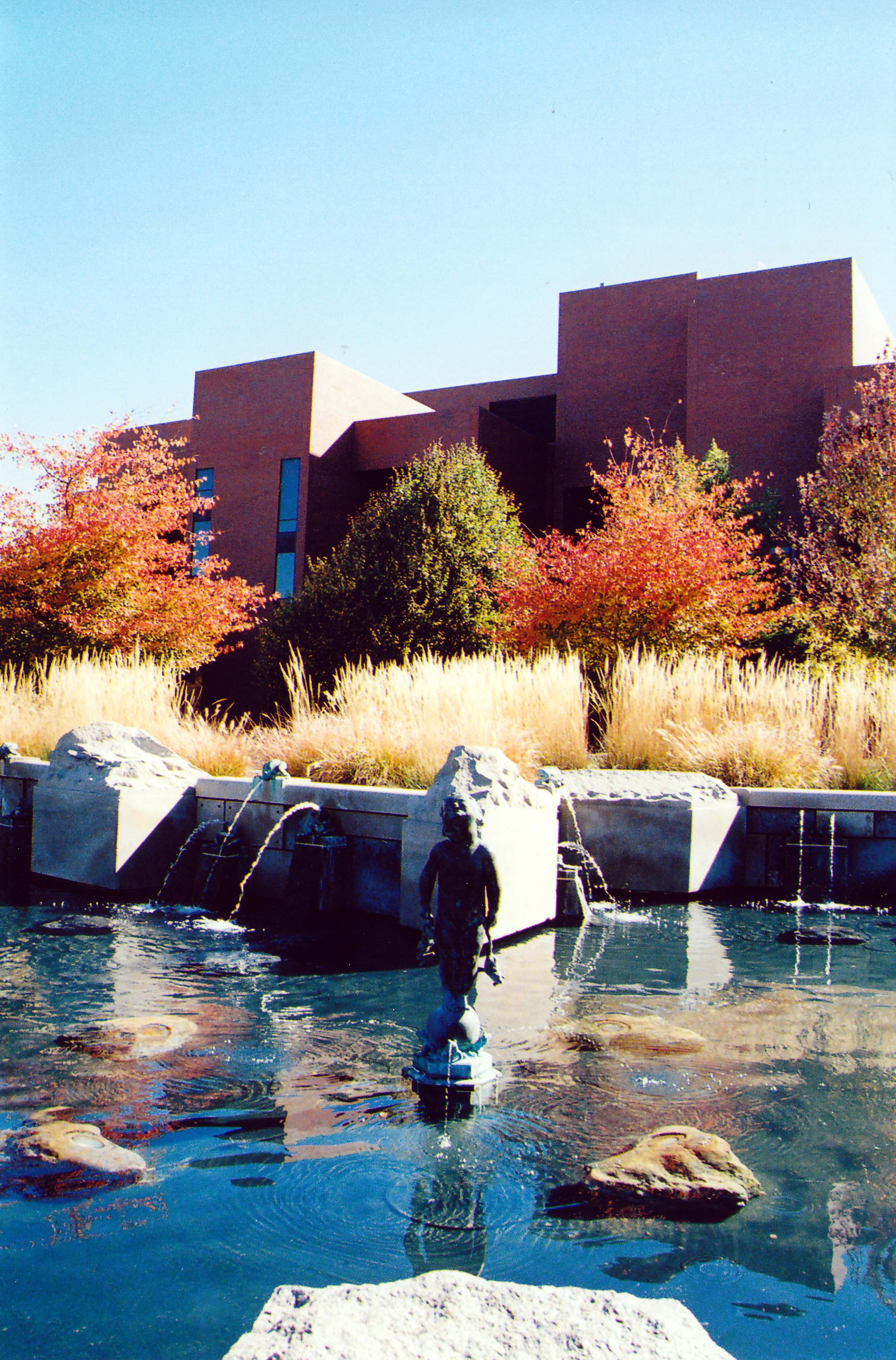
- Artists: Edith Barretto Stevens Parsons (original artist); Rundell Ernstberger Associates (restoration and fountain); Oberle Construction (restoration contractor)
- Year: 1993
- Type: Memorial Statue
- Location: North of Bracken Library Ball State University; 40.20324°N 85.40730°W

Frog Baby Fountain is a statue set in the middle of a fountain on the Ball State University campus. It is known as a sign of good luck and is a popular meeting place. The Frog Baby statue was cast by Edith Barretto Stevens Parsons in 1937 and has been moved several times prior to becoming what it is known as today. Frank C. Ball donated the statue to the university and it remained in the Ball State University Museum of Art until it became damaged by excessive rubbing by students, and was then packed away. In 1993, Frog Baby was restored and placed in a fountain where it resides today. The fountain is dedicated to Alexander Bracken, the son-in-law of Frank C. Ball, who was responsible for Ball State's rapid growth after World War II.

== History ==
The Frog Baby statue, created by American sculptor Edith Barretto Stevens Parson, resides in a central location on the campus of Ball State University and is a well-known part of the university's rich traditions. The statue depicts a young girl who is brightly smiling at the sky while holding one frog in each of her hands. In the surroundings is a fountain of water with small frogs resting on the edges as they spout out water. The statue commemorates Alexander M. Bracken, who served on the Ball State Board of Trustees for 22 years and is also the son-in-law of Frank C.Ball.

Historically, the statue did not always reside in the pond outside Bracken Library. It used to rest in the University's Museum of Art. Frog Baby was first donated by Frank C. Ball, one of the famous Ball Brothers, during the early years of the university. Many legends and traditions are hidden around the campus of Ball State, and it was once said that if one would rub the nose of the statue, it would serve as good luck. As the rumor spread, students year by year began rubbing Frog Baby's nose for good luck on their exams. Over time, the statue's nose was worn away, and in 1993, the statue was sent overseas to be restored by Rundell Ernstberger Associates as the designer and Oberle Construction as the contractor.

Currently, the statue resides in a fountain close to the university's library for safekeeping. Students no longer rub the statue's nose for good luck, but they have started a new Frog Baby tradition. Now, students will dress her up based on the changing seasons. During the winter months in particular, it is frequently seen sporting scarves and knit hats to keep her warm. To take further precautions from damage, security cameras have been installed around the fountain. Although these security cameras are not meant to be discreet, mishaps occur every now and then. In 2009, the statue was vandalized with chalk. The drawer drew a pink bikini on the statue. In fall of 2012 Frog Baby was vandalized again when a student sprayed painted her metallic gold. The university removed the statue to be cleaned and restored. Frog Baby was returned to her pond in the spring of 2013 just in time for graduation. On April 10 2024, Barstool Ball State shared three images of Frog Baby vandalized yet again—this time draped in flowers, along with a dildo and blue plastic bags affixed to its waist with black tape. Barstool, whom captioned the post "Look how they’ve massacred my boy", noted in a comment that they are "not glorifying this act at all", urging students to "not put sex toys on a brass statue of a child".

In 1999, four people attempted to steal Frog Baby. While the statue itself was not stolen, the thieves caused approximately $10,000 in damages to the exhibit and four of the surrounding frogs were taken from the fountain. All four missing frogs were later found and returned.

== Artist ==
Edith Barretto Stevens Parsons was an American born artist. She was born in Houston, Virginia on July 4, 1878. She studied at the Art Students League of New York with John Twachtman, Daniel Chester French, and George Bernard and won scholarships and prizes for her sculptures. Her sculptures are representations of her children often holding turtles, ducks, frogs, and other animals. Edith Parson's sculptures can be found in Memphis Public Park, Tennessee; the Cleveland Museum, Ohio; Ball State University, Indiana and many other places. Edith Baretto Stevens Parsons died in 1956.

== Other copies ==
A common misconception is that the Frog Baby statue at Ball State was made specifically for the university and that it is the only copy that exists. However, another copy of the Frog Baby sculpture resides in Brookgreen Gardens in South Carolina as part of the Gallery of Small Sculptures. It was one of 350 sculptures that was acquired by Archer Milton Huntington and his wife Anna Hyatt Huntington for the gardens. Frog Baby was placed in a pool in the gallery in 1934. There is another copy that is on loan to the Atlanta Botanical Garden from The High Museum of Art in Atlanta, Georgia. There is a fourth copy that is owned by the Forest Lawn Museum in Glendale, California. A fifth copy resides in an interior patio at the Pomona Public Library in Pomona, California.
