= Roofs, High Holborn =

Painting by Lily Delissa Joseph

- Artist: Lily Delissa Joseph
- Year: 1937
- Type: Oil on canvas, landscape painting
- Dimensions: 134.6 cm × 147.3 cm (53.0 in × 58.0 in)
- Location: Tate Britain, London

Roofs, High Holborn is a 1937 oil painting by the British artist Lily Delissa Joseph. A cityscape, it depicts a view across the rooftops of London seen from the artist's studio in Bedford Row in Holborn looking in the direction of the Old Bailey. Joseph was the sister of the artist Solomon Joseph Solomon and was a noted suffragette. She produced this work towards the end of her life. The painting was displayed at the Royal Academy Exhibition of 1937 held at Burlington House in Piccadilly where it was acquired for the nation through the Chantrey Bequest. It now forms part of the collection of the Tate Britain in Pimlico.

== Bibliography ==
- Bohm-Duchen, Monica & Grodzinski, Vera. Rubies & Rebels: Jewish Female Identity in Contemporary British Art. Lund Humphries, 1996.
- Foster, Alicia. Tate Women Artists. Harry N. Abrams, 2004.
