= Lily Delissa Joseph =

British painter and suffragette (1863–1940)

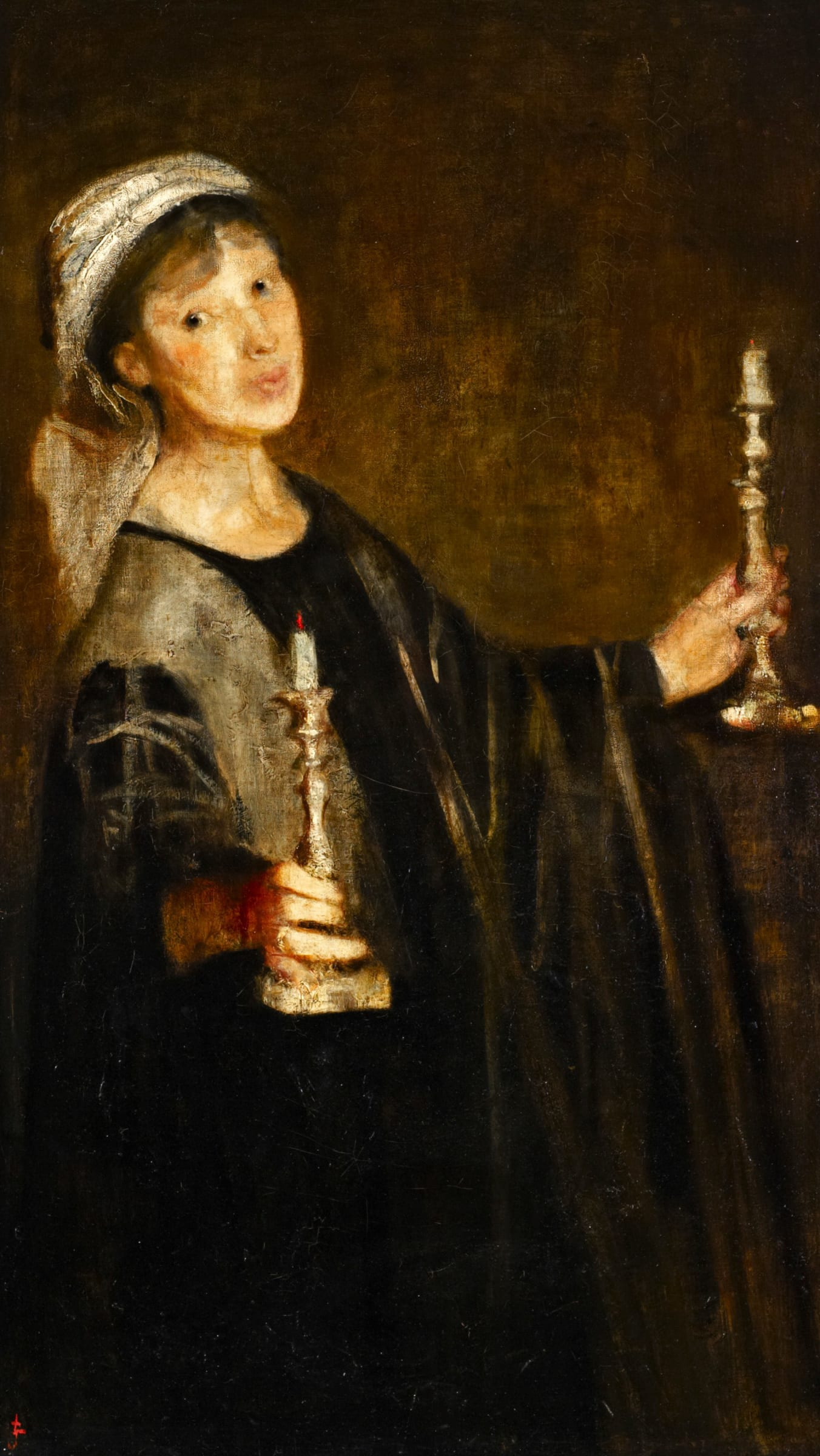
- Self-Portrait with Candles, c. 1910
- Born: Leah Alice Solomon; 24 June 1863; Bermondsey, London
- Died: 27 July 1940 (aged 77); London, UK
- Resting place: Willesden Jewish Cemetery
- Education: Ridley School of Art; Royal College of Art
- Known for: Painting
- Spouse: Delissa Joseph (m. 1887; died 1927)
- Relatives: Solomon Joseph Solomon (brother); Gertrude Golda Lowy (niece)
- Awards: Paris Salon, Silver medal, 1929

Lily Delissa Joseph (née Leah Alice Solomon; 24 June 1863 – 27 July 1940) was a British painter, suffragette, women's right campaigner and philanthropist.

== Biography ==
Joseph was born Leah Alice Solomon on 24 June 1863 in Bermondsey, London to a wealthy and cultured Jewish family. Joseph's father, Joseph Solomon, was an Anglo-Jewish leather manufacturer, and her mother, Helena Solomon (née Lichtenstadt), was born in Prague to an Austrian-Jewish family. One of eleven siblings, Joseph was the sister of artist Solomon Joseph Solomon and the suffragette Henrietta Lowy Solomon. Through her mother, Joseph was related to the composer Ignaz Moscheles.

Joseph studied at the Ridley School of Art and at the Royal College of Art. Joseph painted portraits, interiors and urban landscapes in a style clearly influenced by Impressionism but often with a limited palette.

Joseph was also an activist in both the women's suffrage movement and in support of Jewish charities. She was among the founders of the Ladies' Guild at the Hammersmith Synagogue in west London and also ran reading rooms in the Whitechapel area. After meeting Isaac Rosenberg in 1911, she briefly employed him as a tutor for her children and, with others, helped pay for his studies at the Slade School of Art. Joseph was arrested at least once during the women's suffrage campaign. In March 1912, when her exhibition at the Baille Gallery, Some London and Country Interiors, was reviewed in the Jewish Chronicle a notice appeared on the same page apologising for her absence from the show's Private View reception on the grounds that "she was detained at Holloway Goal in connection with the Women's Suffrage Movement". Joseph, along with her sister Henrietta Lowy Solomon and others, had been imprisoned for taking part in a window-smashing campaign. At the 6th London Salon of the Allied Arists' Association in July 1913, Joseph exhibited a painting 'The Women's March' which although it has not survived is thought to have depicted a suffrage demonstration or, possibly, the 1912 Edinburgh to London 'Women's March'.

Roofs, High Holborn, 1937

In 1924, Joseph and her architect husband held a joint exhibition of drawings and paintings at the Suffolk Street Galleries. Throughout her life Joseph was a regular exhibitor at the Royal Academy, showing some twenty-five paintings between 1904 and 1938. She also exhibited with the Society of Women Artists, the New English Art Club and the Royal Society of British Artists. Joseph exhibited at the Paris Salon receiving an Honourable Mention on one occasion and in 1929 winning a silver medal. In 1946 the Ben Uri Gallery in London had a joint exhibition of works by Joseph and her brother Solomom and examples of her paintings were included in the Jewish Art of Great Britain 1845–1945 exhibition held at the Belgrave Gallery in 1978. The Ben Uri Gallery holds her Self-Portrait with Candles which shows Joseph holding two Sabbath candles and with her head covered observing the Jewish Sabbath. The Tate collection includes a 1937 London scene by Joseph, Roofs, High Holborn, showing the view from her studio towards the Old Bailey. For a time she was also the art critic for 'The Women's Gazette', a paper the supported the Women's Liberal Federation.

In 1887, Joseph married the architect Delissa Joseph (1859–1927). Joseph was a keen cyclist, an early pilot and also a motorist, travelling to Palestine by car in the 1920s. The Josephs had a house at Birchington in Kent for a time.

On 27 July 1940, Joseph died in London and was buried at Willesden Jewish Cemetery.
