= David Owsley Museum of Art =

Art museum in Muncie, Indiana, U.S.

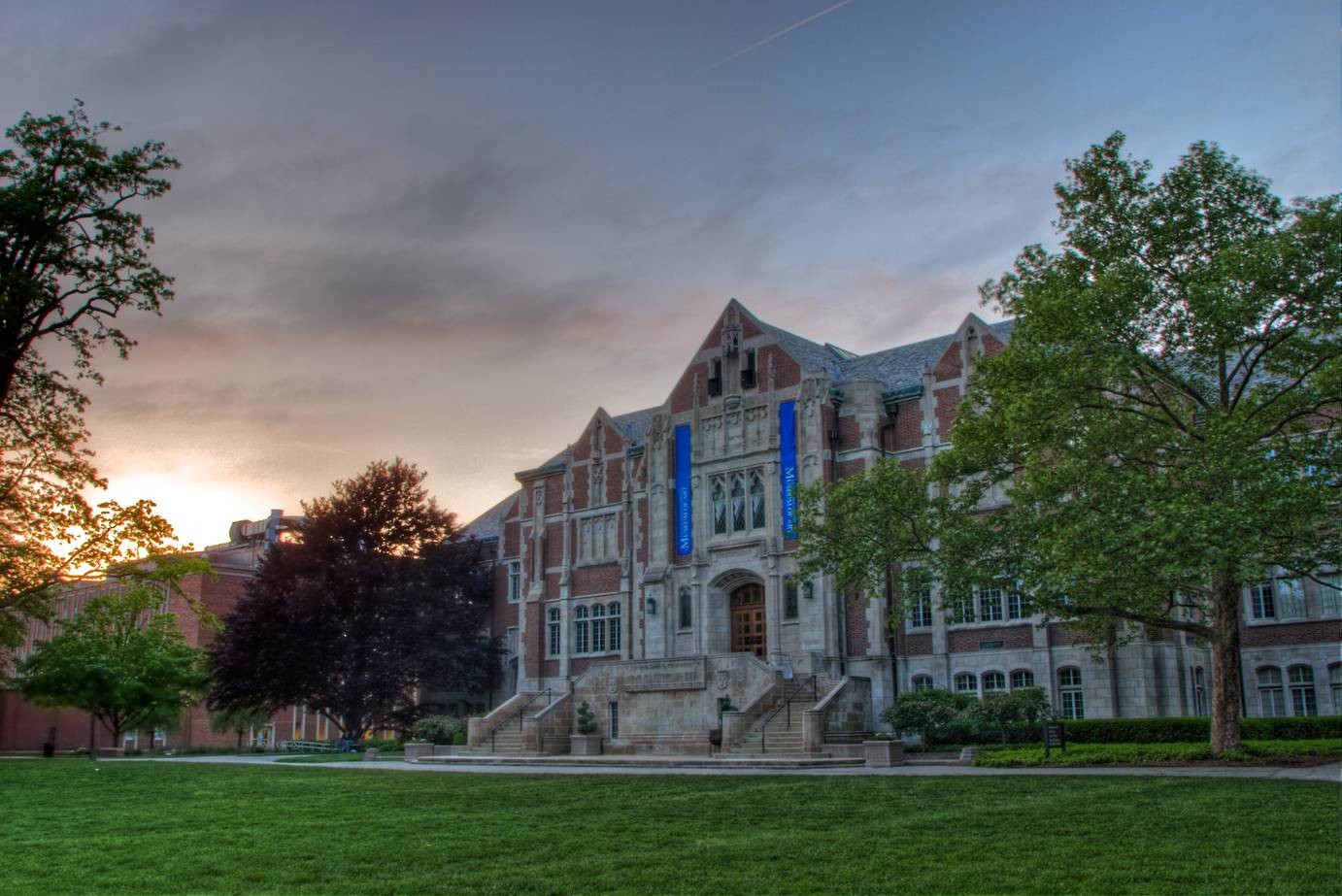
- Established: 1936
- Location: Ball State University in Muncie, Indiana
- Coordinates: 40.1999°N 85.4104°W
- Collection size: 11,000 items
- Director: Robert G. La France
- Parking: McKinley parking garage
- Website: www.bsu.edu/artmuseum

The David Owsley Museum of Art (DOMA) is a university art museum located in the Fine Arts building on the campus of Ball State University, Muncie, Indiana, the United States of America. The museum's name was changed on October 6, 2011, from the Ball State Museum of Art to the David Owsley Museum of Art in honor of David T. Owsley, grandson of Frank C. Ball (one of the five Ball Brothers), to recognize his donation of over 2,300 works of art and planned gift of $5 million. Since departments within the Fine Arts Building relocated to other areas on Ball State's campus, the museum has expanded its galleries, beginning in early-mid-2012 and ending in 2013.

The museum is home to approximately 11,000 works of art (mostly paintings, photographs, prints and sculptures). It is one of only four Indiana art museums with an encyclopedic, world art collection.

== History ==
In 1892, a group of women formed the Art Students' League, hoping to raise interest in art in the growing community of Muncie. The Art Students' League held many successful art exhibits and then formed the Muncie Art Association in 1905, which in turn set goals to host an annual art show and to annually purchase a work of art to help establish a permanent collection. The permanent collection of the Muncie Art Association were located in the hallways of many Muncie schools until the founding of the Indiana State Normal School by the Ball Brothers. The works of art owned by the art association were then moved to the Indiana State Normal School. It was not until 1931 that plans were made to erect a building to permanently house the works of art. Opening in 1936, Architect George F. Schreiber built the Collegiate Gothic style museum, costing $420,000.

=== Fine Arts Building and Museum of Art ===
Just before the Great Depression, there was a need for an Art Center for an ever growing demand for art and music classrooms and space for an art gallery on campus. Architect George F. Schreiber was hired to design the collegiate gothic style building, but was put on hold because the state of Indiana issued a state moratorium on spending in 1932. It was not until 1935 that enough money was raised to begin construction on the building. In 1936, the Fine Arts Building and Museum of Art was opened under President L.A. Pittenger.

The Fine Arts Building also housed the foreign language, English and social science departments, and a Renaissance style auditorium or recital hall.

=== Current and Former Directors of the Museum ===
==== The Past ====
Francis F. Brown was the first supervisor of the gallery. After him came Alice Nichols who was director from 1949 till 1972 when she retired. William Story replaced Nichols and held the job from 1972 till 1983. After him came Alain Joyaux and Peter Blume respectively.

==== The Present ====
After Peter Blume, Robert G. La France was hired in 2014 and is the current director of the David Owsley Museum of Art.

=== Fine Arts Terrace ===
Undergraduate commencement ceremonies for the university are hosted annually in May on the Fine Arts Terrace, a grassy area in the center of the Quad, between the David Owsley Museum of Art and the statue of Beneficence by Daniel Chester French.

== Events ==
The museum hosts multiple events throughout the year. Some events are reoccurring, such as Meditation in the Museum and Sketching in the Museum, which take place during the academic year (August to May) every Friday afternoon. Others are scheduled over the course of the year, and times and dates can be found on the David Owsley Museum of Art website. Updates can also be found on the museum's Facebook (David Owsley Museum of Art Ball State University) and Twitter (@DOMAatBSU) page. They include but are not limited to:

Final Fridays
PechaKucha talks anchor a vibrant evening of creative conversation, art demonstrations, mingling, and more.

Expert Art
Professionals and experts converge to discuss and analyze works of art in the museum.

Docent's Choice
Docent's provide an conversational, inquiry-based tour based on a gallery or theme.

First Person
An artist will talk about the ideas and work represented from a work of art in the museum.

== Collections ==
- Search the collection in external links through the DIDO (Digital Images Delivered Online) Database
- Ball Family Collection
- Indiana Painters, including the Hoosier Group
- Genres of art
1. Ancient
2. Medieval
3. Renaissance
4. 17th century
5. 18th century
6. 19th century
7. Modern/Contemporary Art
8. Asian
9. European and American Works on Paper and Photography
10. European and American Decorative Arts and Furniture
11. Arts of Africa, Oceania, and the Americas

== Notable Works of Art ==
- Print of The Great Wave off Kanagawa, Hokusai
- The Martyrdom of Saint Lawrence, Massimo Stanzione
- Storm King of the Hudson, Thomas Cole
- The Concord Minute Man of 1775, Daniel Chester French
- Under The Trees I, Andre Lhote
- Mao, Andy Warhol
- Statue of Rising Day & Descending Night, Adolph Alexander Weinman from the 1915 San Francisco World's Fair
- Bowl of Goldfish, Childe Hassam
- Pregnant Woman, Edgar Degas
- Right Bird Left, Lee Krasner
- Portrait of Francis Basset (1757-1835), Joshua Reynolds
- Frieze, No. 4, John Coplans
- Portrait of Charlotte, John Watson Gordon

== See also ==
- List of museums in Indiana
