= Still Life and Street =

Xylograph by M.C. Escher

- Artist: M. C. Escher
- Year: 1937
- Type: woodcut
- Dimensions: 48.7 cm × 49 cm (19.2 in × 19 in)

Still Life and Street is an unusual woodcut print by the Dutch artist M. C. Escher which was first printed in March, 1937. It was his first print of an impossible reality. In this artwork there are two distinctly recognizable realities bound together in a natural yet impossible way. Looked at from the window, the houses make book-rests between which tiny dolls are set up. Looked at from the street, the books stand yards high and a gigantic tobacco jar stands at the crossroads.

A small street in Savona, Italy, was the inspiration for this work. Escher said it was one of his favorite drawings but thought he could have drawn it better.

This image is a classic example of Escher's plays on perspective. In it, the horizontal plane of the table continues into the distance to become the street, and the rows of books on the table are seen to lean against the tall buildings that line the street.

== Sources ==
- Locher, J.L. (2000). The Magic of M. C. Escher. Harry N. Abrams, Inc. ISBN 0-8109-6720-0.
