= Edith Barretto Stevens Parsons =

American sculptor

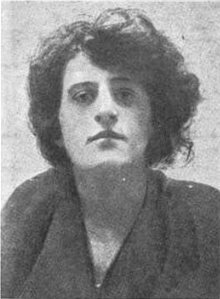
- Parsons in 1921
- Born: Edith Barretto Stevens; 1878; Houston, Virginia
- Died: 1956 (aged 77–78); New Canaan, Connecticut
- Education: Art Students League of New York
- Occupation: Sculptor
- Spouse: Howard Crosby Parsons
- Children: Edith Gilman Parsons

Edith Barretto Stevens Parsons (1878 Halifax, Virginia – 1956 New Canaan, Connecticut) was an American sculptor.

== Life ==
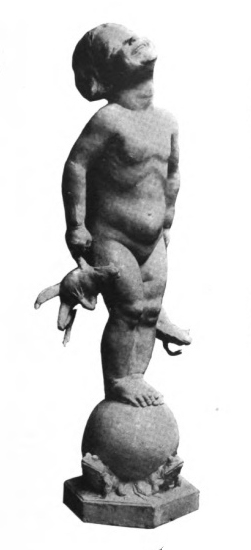
The Laughing Frog Baby, by Edith Parsons, 1917

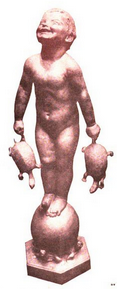
Turtle Baby, by Edith Parsons, 1921

Edith studied with Daniel Chester French, and at the Art Students League of New York, where she won a sculpture prize and scholarships. She apprenticed with James Earle Fraser.

She sculpted figures for the 1902 St. Louis Exposition's Liberal Arts Building, and in 1908 showed her sculpture Earth Mother at the National Academy of Design. That same year, she married and built a studio on the top floor of their home.

Her work changed its subject matter as her own children were born and posed for her sculptures, often holding ducks, turtles, and other creatures. Duck Baby, beginning a series of garden sculptures for which she is best known today, was the popular hit of the 1915 Panama-Pacific Exposition. The exposition handbook stated: "In the presence of so much that is weighty and powerful, the popularity of Duck Baby is a significant and touching indication of the world's hunger for what is cheerful and mirth-provoking." The same may be said of Turtle Baby and Frog Baby, which forms the centerpiece of the small works collection at Brookgreen Gardens, South Carolina.

Parsons also created portrait busts and public monuments including a World War I memorial in Summit, New Jersey, and a fountain dedicated to John Galloway in Memphis, Tennessee.

A quote that appeared in an anonymous newspaper article in the 1920s praised her work.

Though intensely reticent about herself one may, if privileged to enter that home, breathe there the spirit of the gifted woman who has been able to imprison in bronze the smile of a little child.

== Personal life ==
She married Howard Crosby Parsons in 1908. He was a direct descendant of Charles Willson Peale and they had one child, Edith Gilman Parsons.

== See also ==
- Frog Baby Fountain
