= Gerald Brockhurst =

English painter

- Self-Portrait (1949), black chalk on paper
- Born: 31 October 1890; Birmingham, England
- Died: 4 May 1978 (aged 87); Franklin Lakes, New Jersey, United States
- Education: Birmingham School of Art, Royal Academy Schools
- Known for: etching, portraiture, lithography
- Notable work: Adolescence (1933)

Gerald Leslie Brockhurst (31 October 1890 – 4 May 1978) was a British painter and etcher.

During the 1930s and 1940s he was celebrated as a portraitist, painting society figures such as Marlene Dietrich and the Duchess of Windsor. Today he is best known for his small etched prints of beautiful, idealized women – many of them modelled by his first and second wives.

== Biography ==
Born in the Edgbaston district of Birmingham on 31 October 1890, son of a coal merchant called Arthur Brockhurst, he soon showed precocious drawing skills and entered the Birmingham School of Art at the age of twelve. A pupil at the Royal Academy Schools in 1907, he won the gold medal and a travelling scholarship in 1913, enabling him to visit both France and Italy. This led to a closer study of such 15th-century artists as Piero della Francesca, Botticelli and Leonardo da Vinci, whose work had an abiding influence on him. In 1914 he married for the first time to a Frenchwoman, Anaïs Folin, whom he used as the model for most of his early etchings of young womanhood (especially from 1920 till 1934).

From 1915 to 1919 Brockhurst and his wife Anaïs lived in Ireland, where they were friendly with the artist Augustus John and his circle.

Though he tried his hand at etching in 1914, it was not until 1920 that he began his career as an etcher in earnest, eventually achieving success as both a printmaker and society portraitist. Brockhurst held his first important exhibition in 1919, in London, and after it was well received returned to live there. In 1921 he was one of the early members of the newly-formed Society of Graphic Art and exhibited with them. Throughout the 1930s he continued an increasingly successful career as a portrait artist, with notable sitters including the film stars Merle Oberon and Marlene Dietrich, as well as the Duchess of Windsor, whose husband commissioned her portrait. In 1937 Brockhurst was elected to the Royal Academy and was able to command a price of 1,000 guineas for a portrait. In the same year however details of his relationship with his young model Kathleen Woodward, whom he had renamed Dorette, were made public after she gave an interview to the Sunday Express. Brockhurst's marriage had previously come under strain in 1922 when his wife discovered his adultery with her sister, Marguerite, and now broke down acrimoniously, with Brockhurst counter-suing on the grounds of his wife's adultery. In August 1939 Brockhurst and Dorette moved to the United States, and he was eventually divorced from his first wife in 1940. He married Kathleen in 1947.

In New York City, Brockhurst became both famous and rich with a series of society portraits but his printmaking output diminished, especially his etchings. He produced a few lithographs at the end of his career (around 1945). In 1951, he was elected into the National Academy of Design as an Associate member.

In 1958, he appeared as a guest challenger on the TV panel show To Tell The Truth, which is viewable on YouTube.

Brockhurst and Dorette settled in Franklin Lakes, New Jersey, and Brockhurst died there on 4 May 1978. Kathleen 'Dorette' Woodward died in 1996.
