= History of Ball State University =

The History of Ball State University predates Ball State University's public-funding era by almost two decades. Previous educational institutions operated at the intersection of university and McKinley avenues before 1918. They were neither public nor did they carry the "Ball" name.

== Historical timeline ==
Prior institutions in what is now BSU's Administration Building
| Eastern Indiana Normal School | Established | 1899 | Type | private |
| Palmer University | Acquired | 1902 |
| Indiana Normal School and College of Applied Science | Acquired | 1905 |
| | Closed | 1907 to 1912 |
| Muncie Normal Institute | Acquired | 1912 |
| Muncie National Institute | Renamed | 1913 |
| | Closed | 1917 to 1918 |

Modern era
| Eastern Division of Indiana State Normal School | Established | 1918 | Type | public |
| Ball Teachers College, Eastern Division, Indiana State Normal School | Renamed | 1922 |
| Ball State Teachers College | Renamed | 1929 | Governance | Indiana State Teachers College Board |
| Ball State College | Independence | 1961 | Governance | Ball State's Board of Trustees |
| Ball State University | Renamed | 1965 |

== The pre-Ball years ==
The area of Muncie, Indiana that is now known as Ball State University had its start in 1899 as a private school called the Eastern Indiana Normal School to educate teachers. The entire school, including classrooms, library and the president's residence were housed in what is now known as the Ball State Administration building.

The then one-building school had a peak enrollment of 256 and charged $10 for a year's tuition. It operated until the spring of 1901, when it was closed down by its president, F.A.Z. Kumler (Franklin Abia Zeller Kumler - b. Ohio) due to lack of funding. A year later, in the autumn of 1902, the school re-opened as Palmer University for the next three years after Francis Palmer, a retired Indiana banker gave the school a $100,000 endowment.

Between 1905 and 1907, the school dropped the Palmer name and operated as the Indiana Normal College. It had two divisions, the Normal School for educating teachers and a College of Applied Sciences. The school had an average enrollment of about 200 students. Because of a diminishing enrollment and lack of funds, school president Francis Ingler closed Indiana Normal College at the end of the 1906–1907 school year.

Between 1907 and 1912 the campus sat vacant. A local farming family paid off the school's property taxes and used the campus as forage for grazing sheep and cattle. They also kept up the insurance on the Administration Building and used it for storage.

In 1909 Delaware County residents petitioned the state to take over the land and reopen it as a state-funded normal school. The proposal failed when lawmakers did not pass an appropriations bill to pay for the acquisition of the Indiana Normal College land and building.

In 1912, a group of local investors led by Michael Kelly reopened the school as the Indiana Normal Institute. To pay for updated materials and refurbishing the once-abandoned Administration Building, the school operated under a mortgage from the Muncie Trust Company. Although the school had its largest student body with a peak enrollment of 806, officials could not keep up with mortgage payments and the school was forced to shutter once again by June 1917 after the Muncie Trust Company initiated foreclosure proceedings.

== Ball Brothers intervene ==
On July 25, 1917, local industrialists the Ball Brothers, founders of the Ball Corporation bought the Indiana Normal Institute out of foreclosure. For $35,100, the Balls bought the Administration building and surrounding land bordered by Reeves Avenue (now University Avenue), McKinley Avenue, Riverside Avenue and Tillotson Avenue, except for the northwest quadrant which was kept as a wildlife preserve (Christy Woods).

The Balls, who were active donors to the state and national Republican Party, contacted newly elected Indiana governor James Putnam Goodrich, a fellow Republican who was born and raised in the nearby town of Winchester. The Balls proposed giving the school directly to the state. In a lesson learned from the failed 1909 attempt to get state control of the normal school, the Balls wanted to avoid another appropriations bill debate in the Indiana General Assembly.

The Ball Brothers from left to right: George A. Ball, Lucius L. Ball, Frank C. Ball, Edmund B. Ball, and William C. Ball

In early 1918, during the Indiana General Assembly's "short session," state legislators accepted the gift of the school and the land by the Ball Brothers. The state granted operating control of the Muncie Campus and school building to the administrators of the Indiana State Normal School in Terre Haute.

On June 17, 1918, the first students started enrolling at the Indiana State Normal School, Eastern Division. Its initial enrollment was 235 students. Its primary purpose was to serve as a college to educate teachers for the public schools in the surrounding communities including Muncie, Anderson, Richmond, Marion, Gas City and as far away as the boom towns of Indianapolis and Fort Wayne.

The school grew slowly over the next few years to an enrollment of more than 400, helped along by its status as a state-funded college. During this time, the Ball family continued to be benefactors to the school. They donated the funds to build Ball Gymnasium.

The close relationship between the Balls and the school led to an unofficial moniker for the college as many students, faculty and local politicians casually referred to the school as "Ball State" as a shorthand alternative to its longer, official name. During the 1922 short session of the Indiana legislature, the state renamed the school as the Ball Teachers College. This was in recognition to the Ball family's continuing beneficence to the institution. During this act, the state also reorganized its relationship with Terre Haute, and established a separate local board of trustees for the Muncie campus.

In 1924, the State Teachers College Board of Trustees in Terre Haute, Indiana hired Benjamin J. Burris as the first president of the state-funded college. The Ball Brothers continued giving to the university and partially funded the construction of the Science Hall (now called the Burkhart Building) in 1924, an addition to Ball Gymnasium in 1925. By the 1925–1926 school year, Ball State enrollment reaches 991, with 697 women and 294 men.

== Ball State Teachers College ==
For its first decade, Ball Teachers College was treated as an offsite department of Indiana State Normal School. This changed at the regular legislative session of 1929, when the Indiana General Assembly separated the Terre Haute and Muncie campuses of the state teachers college system. However, it left the governance of the Muncie campus under the Indiana State Teachers College Board of Trustees, based in Terre Haute, Indiana. During this action, the school was renamed Ball State Teachers College. The following year enrollment increased to 1,118 with 747 female and 371 male students.

In 1935, the school added the Arts Building for art, music and dance instruction (Which now houses Ball State Art Museum, The Department Of Geology and classes in many other disciplines). Enrollment that year reached 1,151 with 723 women and 428 men.

As an expression of the many gifts the Ball family gave the university since 1917, sculptor Daniel Chester French was commissioned by the Muncie Chamber of Commerce to cast a bronze fountain figure to commemorate the 20th anniversary of the Ball Brother's gift to the state. His creation, the statue Beneficence, still stands today between the Administration Building and Lucina Hall where Talley Street dead ends into University Avenue.

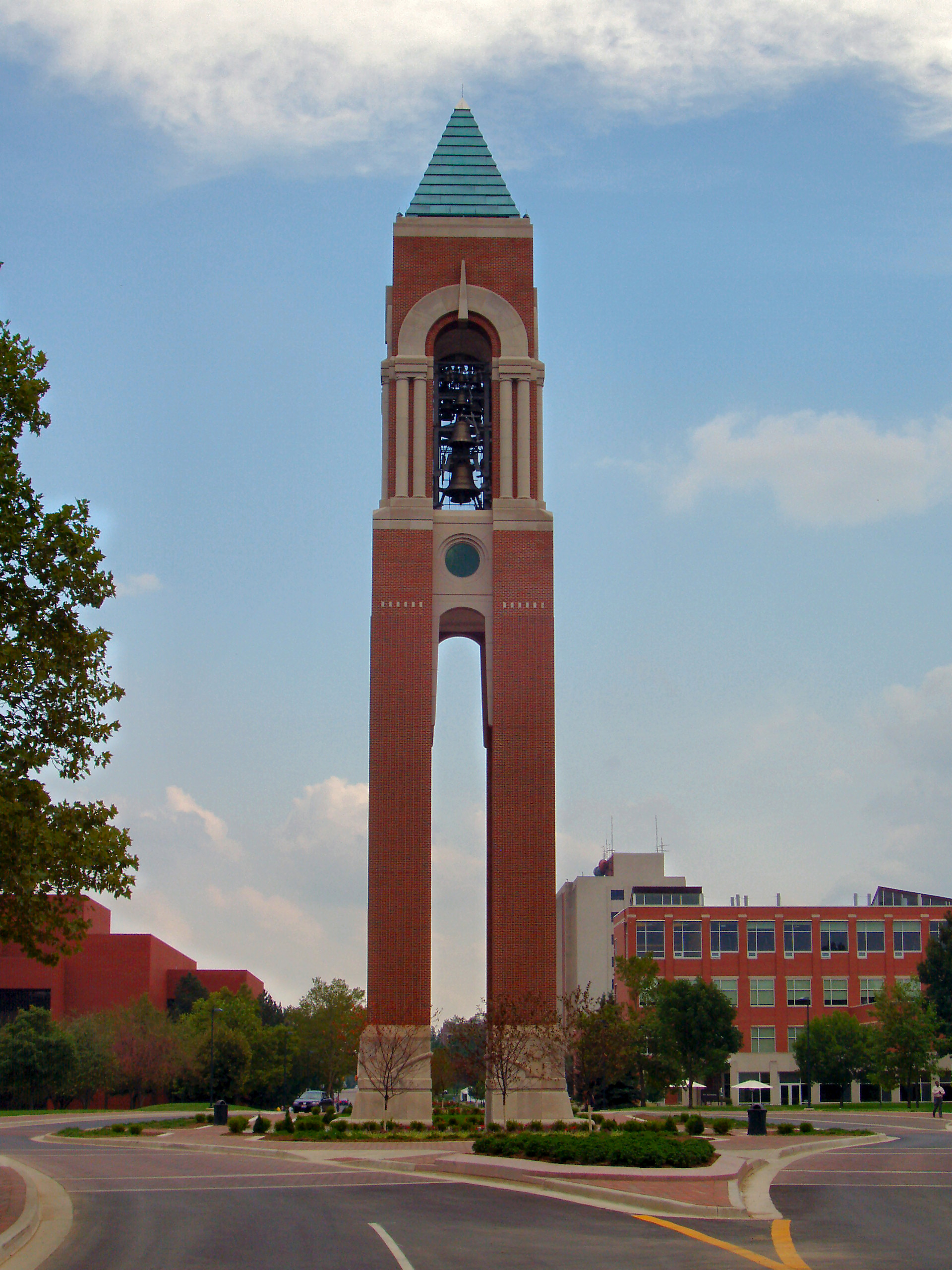
Ball State's Shafer Tower, completed in 2001

The school grew steadily until the 1940s when World War II broke out and many would-be Ball State students opted to join the war effort by enlisting in the military. by 1944 enrollment had dropped to 550 students, the lowest since the 1910s. During this time, on Ball State's campus the U.S. military built barracks on the campus for recruiting, training, and other purposes.

In 1945, John R. Emens took over as the fifth president of the school. In 1946, Ball State purchases the Christy Woods preserve.

Following World War II and due in part to the large number of veterans who took advantage of the G.I. Bill, expansion took on a much swifter rate. The barracks were left for university use. The school used them as dormitories for the new influx of students.

By 1950, the school's enrollment was 3,144 with 1,507 women and 1,637 men. That same year, radio station WBST-FM started broadcasting from the basement of the Administration Building.

In 1961, Ball State became independent of Indiana State via the creation of the Ball State College Board of Trustees, so that Ball State was no longer governed remotely by the Indiana State College Board of Trustees. Also in 1961, the name of Ball State was changed to Ball State College.

== Ball State University ==
In 1965, in recognition of the school growth beyond merely being a school to educate public school teachers, the Indiana General Assembly renames the school as Ball State University with an enrollment of 10,066 students.

It wasn't until the promotion of the school to official "University" status, that Ball State began to grow academically. It was in the same year, 1965, that the College of Architecture and Planning was established, offering the only public-university degrees in architecture within Indiana. Programs expanded, and more teachers were hired from across the nation in response to this. Thus, the school which had been dubbed the "Little Commonwealth" was now expanding into the modern world.

Ball State has seen a trend of near-constant growth since its creation. Current enrollment is the highest in the school's history, prompting construction of new residence halls that were completed in 2007 (Park Hall) and 2010 (Kinghorn Hall). Bachelor's degrees are available in eight different areas which contain over fifty individual programs—a sharp increase from the five programs in which the university initially offered degrees. Despite current uncertainty in the economy, Ball State's academic future is considered by many to be bright as the university continues a course of upgrading programs and adding new ones where applicable. At 2021 its enrollment is approximately 22,443 students, both graduate and undergraduate; full-time enrollment is 14,851, with part-time enrollment at 6,592.

== Past presidents ==
1. William Wood Parsons (1918–1921)
2. Linnaeus Neal Hines (1921–1924)
3. Benjamin J. Burris (1924–1927)
4. Lemuel Arthur Pittenger (1927–1942)
5. Winfred Ethestal Wagoner (1943–1945)*
6. John Richard Emens (1945–1968)
7. John J. Pruis (1968–1978)
8. Richard W. Burkhardt (1978–1979)*
9. Jerry M. Anderson (1979–1981)
10. Robert P. Bell (1981–1984)
11. John E. Worthen (1984–2000)
12. Blaine A. Brownell (2000–2004)
13. Beverley J. Pitts (2004)*
14. Jo Ann M. Gora (2004–2014)
15. Paul W. Ferguson (2014–2016)
16. Terry S. King (2016–2017)*
17. Geoffrey Mearns (2017–present)

* Interim presidency

== See also ==
- Ball State University
