= Worthen (surname) =

Worthen is a surname. Notable people with the surname include:

- Amos Henry Worthen, American geologist
- Amy Namowitz Worthen (born 1946), American artist
- Augusta Harvey Worthen (1823–1910), American author and teacher
- Clyde Worthen, American judoka
- Ezekiel Worthen (1710–1793), American military officer
- Joey Worthen (born 1979), American soccer player
- John Worthen (literary critic), English academic, literary critic and biographer
- John E. Worthen (born 1933), American university president
- Kevin J Worthen (born 1957), American lawyer and BYU president
- Molly Worthen (born 1981), American writer
- Naz Worthen (born 1966), American football player
- Rande Worthen (born 1956), American politician
- Sam Worthen (born 1958), American basketball player
- Sandra Worthen (1937-2022), American politician
- Shawn Worthen (born 1978), American football player
- Trebor Worthen (born 1980), American politician
- William Ezra Worthen (1819–1897), American civil engineer
