= List of presidents of Ball State University =

The following are Ball State University presidents. Ball State is located in Muncie, Indiana.

No.	Image	President	Term start	Term end	Refs.
1 (Note: Head of the school by serving as president of the Terre Haute-based Indiana State Normal School)		William Wood Parsons	1918	September 30, 1921	
2		Linnaeus Neal Hines	October 1, 1921	November 30, 1924	
3		Benjamin J. Burris	December 1, 1924	April 26, 1927 (Note: Died in office)	
4		Lemuel Arthur Pittenger	July 15, 1927	December 31, 1942	
5 (Note: Interim president)		Winfred Ethestal Wagoner	January 1, 1943	July 31, 1945	
6		John Richard Emens	August 1, 1945	June 30, 1968	
7		John J. Pruis	July 1, 1968	August 31, 1978	
8		Richard W. Burkhardt	September 1, 1978	June 30, 1979	
9		Jerry M. Anderson	July 1, 1979	February 2, 1981	
10		Robert P. Bell	February 2, 1981	June 30, 1984	
11		John E. Worthen	July 1, 1984	June 30, 2000	
12		Blaine A. Brownell	July 1, 2000	January 31, 2004	
acting		Beverley J. Pitts (Note: Served as provost before becoming acting/interim president)	February 1, 2004	August 8, 2004	
13		Jo Ann M. Gora	August 9, 2004	June 30, 2014	
14		Terry S. King	July 1, 2014	July 31, 2014	
15		Paul W. Ferguson	August 1, 2014	January 25, 2016	
16		Terry S. King	January 25, 2016	May 14, 2017	
17		Geoffrey S. Mearns	May 15, 2017	present	

Table notes:

Note: Ball State appears to include interim president but not acting presidents in their official count of university presidents, so only Beverley J. Pitts is not include in the presidential count.
