= Worthen (disambiguation) =

Worthen is a village in Shropshire, England.

Worthen may also refer to:

- Worthen (surname)
- Worthen, Arkansas, unincorporated community in Galla Township, Pope County, Arkansas, United States
- Worthen's sparrow (Spizella wortheni), species of sparrow

== See also ==
- John E. Worthen Arena, basketball arena in Muncie, Indiana, United States
