= John Worthen =

John Worthen may refer to:

- John Worthen (literary critic), professor of D.H. Lawrence studies
- John E. Worthen, president of Ball State University, and president of Indiana University of Pennsylvania
