= John R. Emens College-Community Auditorium =

Auditorium in Muncie, Indiana, U.S.

General information
- Type: Auditorium
- Architectural style: Postmodern
- Location: Ball State University; 1800 West Riverside Avenue; Muncie, Indiana; United States
- Coordinates: 40.2011°N 85.4070°W
- Named for: John R. Emens
- Completed: 1964

Design and construction
- Architects: Walter Scholer & Associates

Website
- www.bsu.edu/emens

The John R. Emens College-Community Auditorium, or Emens Auditorium, is an auditorium on the campus of Ball State University in Muncie, Indiana, United States. The facility is used to host Broadway shows, plays, multi-genre concerts, and university events, as well as regional events for eastern Indiana. Emens Auditorium has a seating capacity of 3,581. The Auditorium was opened on March 14, 1964, when Fred Waring and his Pennsylvanians performed. Attached to the rear of the facility is a smaller theater used for performing arts shows.

== General information ==
Emens cost $2.975 million to build in 1964. The architect was Walter Scholer, and the contractor was Hagerman Construction Co., Fort Wayne, Indiana. The stage is 144 feet wide by 45 feet deep, and stage floor to gridiron is 78 feet. The proscenium arch is 82 feet wide. A 16-ton fireproof curtain divides the stage from the house. Its opening date or "Sneak Previews" for the public was on March 14 and 15, 1964, dedication, October 25, 1964. The official name of the venue is John R. Emens College-Community Auditorium. To build Emens, a charity fund-raising was begun in 1960 and succeeded its goal of $1.5 million by $10,532 on January 25, 1964. The auditorium was named for the president of the school at that time John R. Emens. The university honored his wife five years after the opening by naming the art-filled lounge on the auditorium's second floor the Aline Brainerd Lounge. The auditorium adds more than $2 million to the local economy each summer and presents concerts to the public.

== History ==
Planning for the auditorium began as early as 1947, but the U-shaped building was not actually built until 1961. The structure includes the Hargreeves Music Building, Arts and Communications Building, and the 410-seat University Theatre. In its first 25 years, more than 3.6 million people visited the then 3,581-seat auditorium to see 2,335 programs. The acoustic scalloped ceiling and state-of-the-art sound capabilities of Emens Auditorium account for the attraction of many artists to performing in this facility. After a performance in 1969, Bill Cosby said, "This is the greatest hall I have ever played ... the greatest acoustics."

== Performers and speakers ==
Since the grand opening in 1964, many artists, individuals, musicians, and shows have appeared at Emens, including United States President Gerald Ford, David Letterman, Stevie Wonder (1970), Louis Armstrong, Victor Borge, illusionist David Copperfield, comedian Adam Sandler, musicals Cats and Les Misérables, Red Skelton, B.B. King, the Temptations, Third Eye Blind (1998), and the Dixie Chicks.

- 1964, March 14; very first event: Fred Waring and his Pennsylvanians.
- 1964 Edgar Bergen, Peter Nero, Louis Armstrong
- 1965 Dave Brubeck, Bob Newhart, Ronald Reagan, Igor Stravinsky, Oscar Shumsky, Rudolf Friml, Robert Goulet, Peter Nero
- 1966 Johnny Mathis, Pearl Buck, Count Basie, Helen Hayes, Hans Conried, Ferrante and Teicher
- 1967 Isaac Stern; Peter, Paul and Mary; Maria von Trapp, Simon and Garfunkel, Pat Paulsen, Arthur Fiedler, Hans Conried, Jerome Hines, Tom Ewell
- 1968 Paul Newman, Mantovani, Shirley Verrett, actor John Davidson, pianist Roger Williams, Peter Nero, Tom Ewell, Rosemary, Tommy James & The Shondells with The Box Tops
- 1969 Four Tops, The Cowsills, Ralph Nader, Jose Feliciano, The Righteous Brothers, Eugene Ormandy, Ferrante and Teicher
- 1970 Guy Lombardo, BJ Thomas, Jeane Dixon, Stevie Wonder, Hans Conried, Dionne Warwick
- 1971 The First Edition, Duke Ellington, Art Linkletter, Pierre Boulez
- 1972 Itzhak Perlman, Doc Severinsen, Henry Mancini, Betty Friedan, Pierre Boulez, Roberta Peters, Shelley Berman
- 1973 George Carlin, Lily Tomlin, Dionne Warwick, The Carpenters, Arthur Fiedler, John Mayall, Isaac Stern, Mary Travers
- 1974 Rare Earth, Boots Randolph, Richie Havens, Johnny Cash with Carl Perkins, Mac Davis, Van Cliburn, Anne Murray, John Raitt, Ferrante and Teicher, Vivian Blaine, Imogene Coca
- 1975 The Imperials, Bill Cosby, Stan Kenton, Leonard Rose, Aaron Copland, Myrna Loy, Ricardo Montalbán, pianist Roger Williams, Peter Nero, Eddie Bracken
- 1976 The Spinners, Alex Haley, Dixy Lee Ray, Gene Roddenberry, Michael Tilson Thomas, jazz singer Nancy Wilson, Peter Nero, Dana Andrews, Howard Duff
- 1977 John Kenneth Galbraith, Red Skelton, Harry Chapin, Pearl Bailey, Leonard Rose, violinist Eugene Fodor, Arthur Fiedler, Henry Mancini, Robert Merrill, John Raitt
- 1978 Jerry Lewis, The Amazing Kreskin, Dizzy Gillespie, Burl Ives, Alicia de Larrocha, Jerome Hines, Dave Brubeck, Harry Chapin, pianist Roger Williams, Kathryn Crosby
- 1979 Ann Landers, David Letterman, Pablo Cruise, Chuck Mangione, Coretta Scott King, Andrés Segovia, Roberta Peters, Peter Nero, Forrest Tucker
- 1980 Dick Gregory, Kenny Loggins, Mel Torme, Rich Little, Don Ho, Isaac Stern, Leonard Rose, Anna Maria Alberghetti
- 1981 Vincent Price, Mike Wallace, Gordon Lightfoot, Chuck Mangione, Red Skelton, Imogene Coca
- 1982 Charlie Daniels, Admiral Hyman Rickover, Johnny Cash, Cab Calloway, Eddie Bracken, singer Pat Carroll
- 1983 Tammy Wynette, Rita Coolidge, Oscar Shumsky, Chuck Mangione
- 1984 Liberace, Neil Young, Mickey Gilley, Malcolm Frager
- 1985 Gerald Ford, Ray Charles, illusionist David Copperfield, Roy Clark, Sergiu Comissiona, Betsy Palmer
- 1986 singer Tom Jones, Joe Biden, Stevie Ray Vaughan, Malcolm Frager, Red Skelton, Henry Lee Summer, 2nd Chapter of Acts, The Manhattan Transfer (Sept. 27), Bella Davidovich & Muncie Symphony Orchestra (Oct 25), Patrick Tretick & her children & Muncie Symphony Orchestra (Jan. 19), Malcolm Frager & Muncie Symphony Orchestra (Mar. 16).
- 1987 Randy Travis, Henry Kissinger, Marie Osmond, Tony Bennett, Imogene Coca, Frank Gorshin
- 1988 Jimmy Carter, Ray Stevens, Everly Brothers, Jay Leno, Malcolm Frager, Dave Brubeck, Ronnie Milsap, pianist Roger Williams, Mitzi Gaynor
- 1989 Anne Murray
- 1990 Willie Nelson, Ann Margaret, Pat Boone
- 1991 Rudolph Nureyev
- 1992 Dick Vitale
- 1993 Timothy Leary, cartoonist Jim Davis
- 1994 Jesse Jackson, Judy Collins, Chris Rock
- 1995 Dr. Ruth Westheimer, the Smothers Brothers, Sponge with Live
- 1996 Kareem Abdul-Jabbar, Gin Blossoms
- 1997 Bob Dylan, Carrot Top, Adam Sandler, The Why Store
- 1998 Jeff Foxworthy, B.B. King, Clay Walker/Dixie Chicks, Eve 6, Third Eye Blind
- 1999 Wynton Marsalis, Kenny Chesney
- 2000 comedian Gallagher, Elie Wiesel, Weird Al Yankovic
- 2001 Jack Johnson with Ben Harper
- 2002 Penn & Teller
- 2003 Bill Cosby, Lewis Black, Willie Nelson, George Carlin, Rascal Flatts
- 2004 Dave Chappelle, Brad Paisley, Keith Urban, Eric Schlosser
- 2005 Ron White, Malcolm Gladwell, Muse
- 2006 Ben Folds, Bo Diddley, Chris Botti and David Sanborn
- 2007 Mickey Rooney, Joe Bonamassa
- 2008 Vince Gill, Jeff Dunham, Umphrey's McGee
- 2009 David Sedaris, Loretta Lynn, Jason Aldean
- 2010 Jim Brickman, David Letterman and Biz Stone
- 2011 Tommy Emmanuel, Dierks Bentley, David Letterman and Rachel Maddow, Jeff Dunham
- 2012 Jeannette Walls, political consultant David Axelrod, David Letterman and Oprah Winfrey, Switchfoot
- 2013 Bob Knight, Hunter Hayes, Jim Gaffigan, Impractical Jokers, Garrison Keillor, Martina McBride, Florida Georgia Line, Rhythmic Circus, Soledad O'Brien, Jason Mraz, the musical Hello Dolly!, The Price Is Right, and Sierra Hull.
- 2014 The Fray, Big Bad Voodoo Daddy, Mannheim Steamroller
- 2015 John Mellencamp
- 2016 Macklemore & Ryan Lewis, Jeremy Camp Blue Man Group (Feb 29)
- 2019 Easter at Emens (with Union Chapel Ministries & Destiny Christian Center) (Apr 21)
- 2020 Blue Man Group (Feb 24)
- 2022 Alice Cooper

== See also ==
- List of music venues in the United States
