= Estopinal =

Estopinal is a surname. Notable people with the surname include:

- Albert Estopinal (1845–1919), American planter

== See also ==
- Estopinal College of Architecture and Planning
