= John R. Emens =

President of Ball State University (1901–1976)

President of Ball State University
- In office 1945–1968
- Preceded by: Winfred E. Wagoner
- Succeeded by: John J. Pruis

Personal details
- Born: October 10, 1901 Prattville, Michigan
- Died: October 25, 1976 (aged 75) Muncie, Indiana
- Spouse: Aline B. Emens
- Education: Eastern Michigan University; University of Michigan

John R. Emens was born on October 10, 1901, on a small farm near Prattville, Michigan.

At the beginning of his career he started out as a principal of Defer Junior High School in Grosse Pointe Farms, Michigan in 1920. Three years later he became the principal of East Detroit High School.

In 1926 he received his bachelor's degree at Eastern Michigan University. The next year he attended the University of Michigan and obtained his master's degree and then became an instructor there. In 1928 accepted a position at Plymouth High School as a principal and athletic coach. After a short two years there he went to Jackson High School to be their assistant principal and director of vocational and educational guidance. He stayed there for five years. In 1935 he became the director of teacher education and certification at Michigan State. The next year he earned his doctorate there and also accepted the position of assistant of public instruction. He held three different jobs during the years from 1938 to 1945: associate professor of secondary education at Wayne State University, deputy superintendent of Michigan schools, and director of personnel for the Detroit Public schools.

On August 1, 1945, he was inaugurated as the sixth president of what was then Ball State Teachers College. He envisioned a "campus of the future" that had an auditorium "large enough to house most college functions as well as major symphonies, Broadway productions, ballets, and other forms of entertainment for Muncie and east central Indiana audiences."

During his time as president he started many new colleges at Ball State University:

- Architecture
- Business
- Fine Arts
- Education
- Science
- Humanities

Also during his presidency many new buildings were constructed, including:

- Residence halls
- Practical Arts Buildings
- Physical Science-Mathematics Building
- Nursing Education Building
- Athletic Stadium
- L.A. Pittenger Student Center

Most notably, Emens oversaw Ball State's maturing from a teacher-training school to a comprehensive university. In 1961, after a 32-year relationship with Indiana State University, Ball State received its own board of trustees and dropped "Teachers" from its name. Only four years later, it was granted university status as Ball State University.

Emens Auditorium is named after him. Planning for this building started at the beginning of his tenure, but it wasn't built until 1961, almost 15 years later.

Ball State's enrollment grew exponentially during his tenure, from around 1,000 in 1945 when he first started as president, to over 13,000 in 1968 when he retired. After his first year, enrollment had already doubled.

After he retired he continued to live in Muncie, and continued to give back to the community. He was a fundraiser for the Muncie Civic Theater from 1974 to 1976. He also helped form an investment club called the Stock Watchers of Muncie.

Emens died on October 25, 1976, in Muncie.

== Ball State University ==
Emens was selected the sixth President of Ball State University at the age of 44 in 1945. World War II was coming towards an end, and during Emens' time as president, Ball State saw tremendous growth in population. In 1945 its enrollment was 1,010 and by 1968 had reached 13,000.

During Emens' tenure, many different kinds of needs started to arise and a long-ter, plan was necessary for the institution. This plan was carried out for the next 18 years and the campus expanded dramatically with the construction of almost 20 new buildings. On February 5, 1965, Ball State Teachers College was renamed Ball State University due to the tremendous growth of the campus and the additions of many different departments, including the College of Architecture and Planning.

=== Effect on Ball State University ===
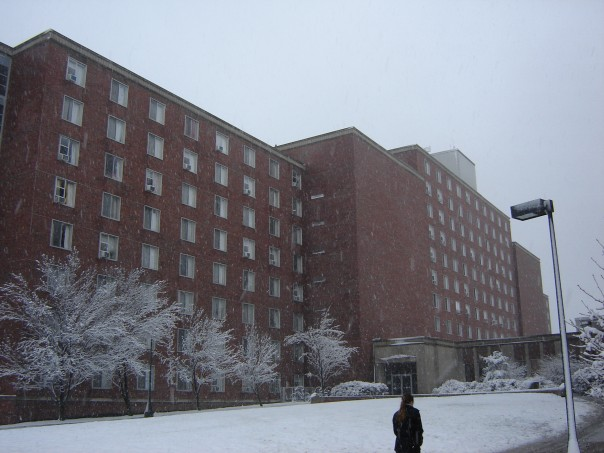
LaFollette Complex, BSU

High school seniors who have actively participated in and provided leadership for academic and extracurricular activities in their high schools and local communities are eligible to apply for the John R. Emens and Aline B. Emens Scholarship. The value of the Emens Scholarship varies from year to year. In recent years it has been the value of one-half the amount of in-state tuition and is determined annually based on the availability of funds. The award is for eight semesters and is subject to an annual review of the student's leadership activities and academic progress.

- Campus additions during presidency
  - Applied Technology Building (1948)
  - College of Business Building (1950)
  - L.A. Pittenger Student Center (1952)
  - Woodworth Complex (1956)
  - Wagoner Complex (1957)
  - Arts and Communications Building (1957)
  - Hargreaves Music Building (1958)
  - Dehority Complex (1960)
  - Noyer Complex (1962)
  - Irving Gymnasium (1962)
  - Emens Auditorium (1964)
  - Studebaker Complex (1964–1965)
  - Cooper Science Building (1967)
  - LaFollette Complex (1967)
  - Scheumann Stadium (1967)
  - Teachers College (1968)
  - Lewellen Pool (1968)

== Awards and honors ==
- Honorary Doctor of Laws from Washburn University

== See also ==
- List of Ball State University Presidents

| Preceded by Winfred E. Wagoner | President of Ball State University; 1945–1968 | Succeeded by John J. Pruis |
