= Journal of Urban History =

American peer-reviewed academic journal

- Cover of the Journal of Urban History.
- Discipline: Urban studies
- Language: English
- Edited by: David Goldfield

Publication details
- History: 1974–present
- Publisher: SAGE Publications (United States)
- Frequency: Bimonthly
- Impact factor: 0.261 (2017)

Standard abbreviations
- ISO 4: J. Urban Hist.

Indexing
- ISSN: 0096-1442 (print); 1552-6771 (web)
- LCCN: 78641478
- OCLC no.: 1798556

Links
- Journal homepage; Online access; Online archive

The Journal of Urban History (abbreviated JUH) is an American bimonthly peer-reviewed academic journal covering the field of urban studies. The current editor-in-chief is David Goldfield, who is Robert Lee Bailey Professor of History at the University of North Carolina at Charlotte. The journal was established in 1974 and is published by SAGE Publications in association with the Urban History Association.

== History ==
The journal published its first issue in November 1974. Raymond A. Mohl served as editor-in-chief from the inaugural issue until 1977. At that point, Blaine A. Brownell was appointed as editor, and he was succeeded by David Goldfield in 1990. Mohl's first editorial noted that the journal would encompass a variety of subjects, methodologies, and interpretations of urbanity in the then-emerging field of urban history.

== Abstracting and indexing ==
The journal is abstracted and indexed in Scopus and the Social Sciences Citation Index. According to Journal Citation Reports, its 2017 impact factor was 0.261.

== See also ==
- List of planning journals
- List of history journals
