= L. A. Pittenger =

President of Ball State University
- In office 1927–1942
- Preceded by: Benjamin J. Burris
- Succeeded by: Winfred E. Wagoner

Personal details
- Born: September 27, 1873 DeSoto, Indiana
- Died: July 12, 1953 (aged 79)
- Spouse: Bertha Orr

Lemuel Arthur "L. A." Pittenger (September 27, 1873 – July 12, 1953) is best known as being the 4th president of Ball Teachers College later known as Ball State University, as well as having Ball State University's student center named after him.

== Early life ==
Pittenger grew up in Selma, Indiana on his family's farm and graduated from Selma High School. Later he obtained his undergraduate degree from Indiana University Bloomington.

== Indiana State Normal School ==
From 1905 to 1907 he was a professor at the Indiana Normal School, which later became Ball State University. Pittenger and Frank C. Ball attempted to persuade Taylor University to relocate their campus to Muncie, in a rescue attempt of the failing Indiana Normal School. Once the Indiana Normal School went under, Pittenger returned to Indiana University for advanced schooling. From 1913 to 1920 he was the head of the English department at Ohio Normal School at Kent (now Kent State University). In 1920, Pittenger became ill and returned to Selma. Two years later Erle Clippinger also became ill and had to temporarily cease teaching at the Indiana State Normal School. Linnaeus Hines, who was then the president of the Indiana State Normal School system, requested personally that Pittenger take Clippinger's place at the Indiana State Normal School, and Pittenger accepted.

== Ball Teachers College ==
Pittenger began working at Ball Teachers College in 1922, and quickly became the most important person on campus during the 1920s and 1930s due to his partnership with Frank C. Ball. At this time, Pittenger was elected into the Indiana House of Representatives (1922, 1924 and 1926). He became the chairman to the powerful Ways and Means Committee, and eventually persuaded the Indiana General Assembly to separate the Ball Teachers College's budget from that of the Indiana State Normal School.

=== Presidency (1927–1942) ===
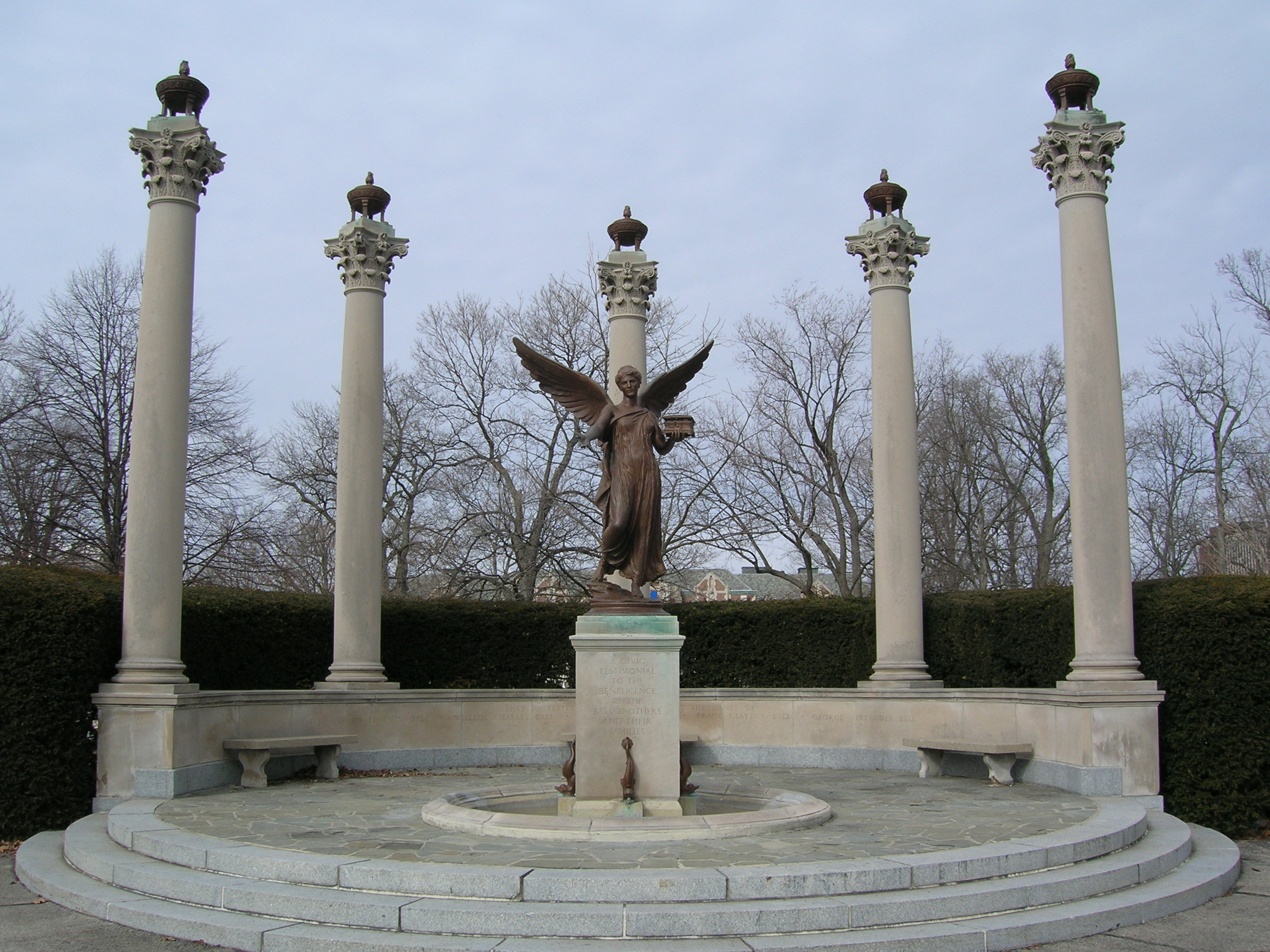
Beneficence Memorial, BSU

Pittenger assumed the presidency of Ball Teachers College after the death of President Benjamin J. Burris in 1927. During Pittenger's presidency, the Indiana General Assembly separated the Ball Teachers College from the Indiana State Normal School and changed the name to Ball State Teachers College. Pittenger resigned in December 1942 due to illness.

==== Effect on Ball State University ====
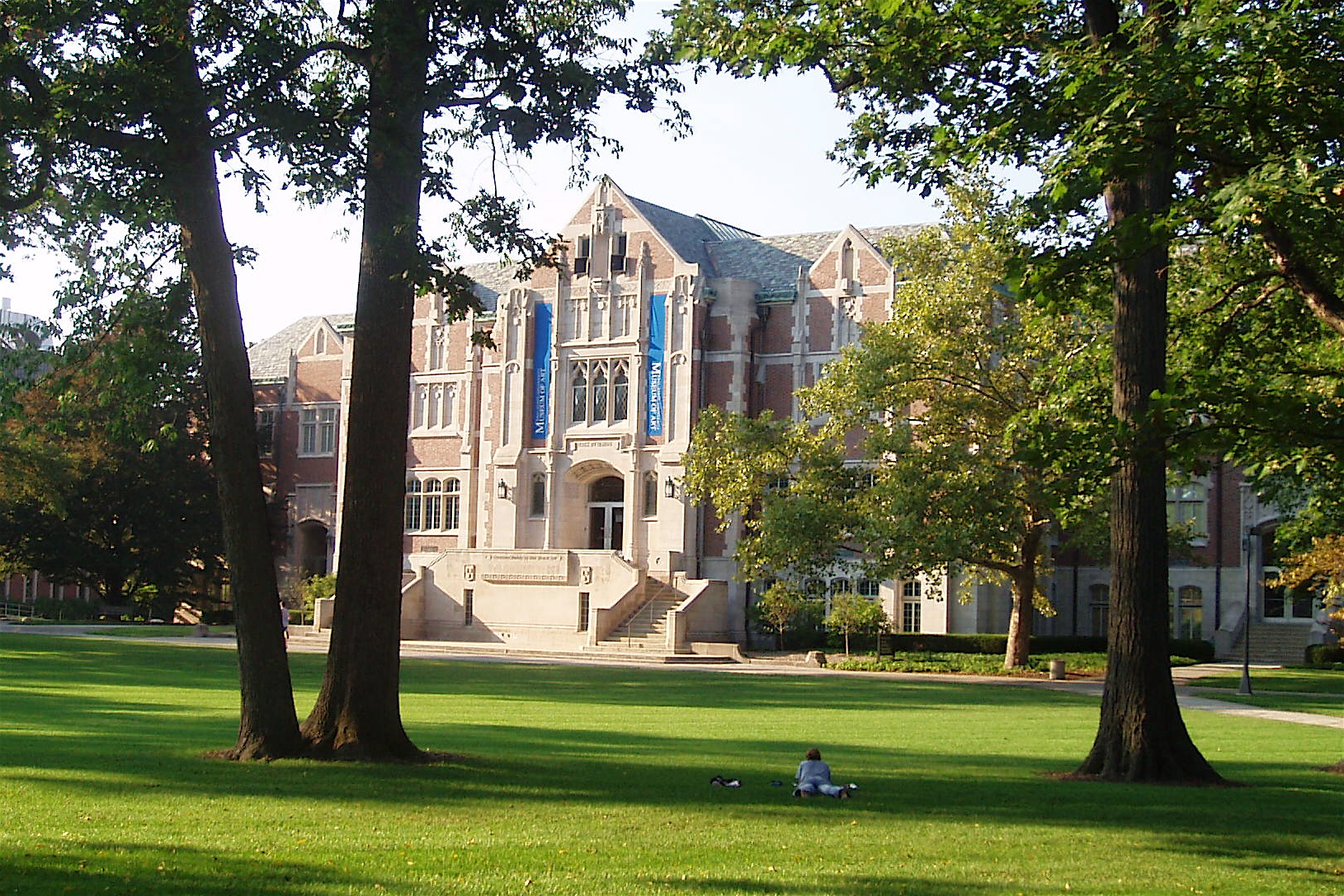
Fine Arts Building, BSU

- Ball Teachers College was renamed Ball State Teachers College in 1930 and was added to the list of accredited colleges and universities.
- Campus Additions During Presidency
  - Athletic Fields (1928)
    - Included a quarter-mile track, and jumping pits for men and women; baseball, football, soccer, hockey, and speedball fields; horseshoe, croquet, and tennis courts and an archery range
  - Burris Laboratory School (1928)
  - Fine Arts Building and Museum of Art (1936)
  - Beneficence Memorial (1937)
  - Elliot Hall (1938)

== L. A. Pittenger Student Center ==
In 1952, Ball State constructed a student center on the south side of University Avenue, across the street from the Administration building and named it after Pittenger. The student center was built in the Collegiate Gothic Architectural style and had several extreme renovations and additions. The building includes meeting rooms, a hotel, food court, bowling alley and a barber shop. The building also hosts Late Nite, a drug prevention program for students at Ball State which has several unique activities for students to participate in on Saturday Nights.

== See also ==
- List of Ball State University Presidents

| Preceded by Benjamin J. Burris | President of Ball State University; 1927–1942 | Succeeded by Winfred E. Wagoner |
