= Ball State Center for Energy Research/Education/Service =

Center for Energy Research/Education/Service
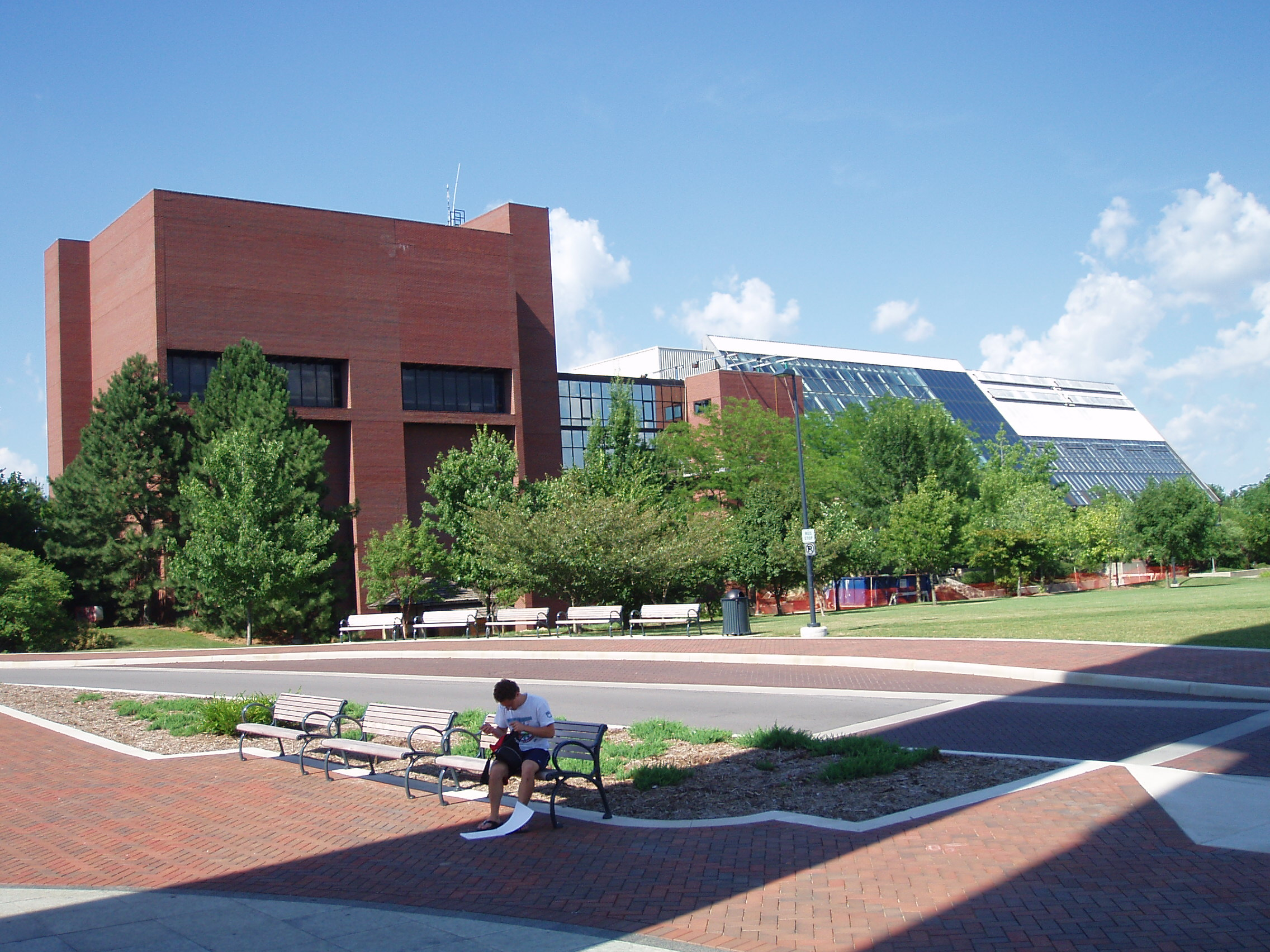
- The Center for Energy Research/Education/Service and Estopinal College of Architecture and Planning. CERES is the all glass part of the building
- Type: Center/Institute
- Established: 1982
- Parent institution: Ball State University
- Director: Robert Koester
- Location: North of University Green; 40.204517°N 85.407007°W
- Website: cms.bsu.edu/academics/centersandinstitutes/ceres

The Ball State Center for Energy Research/Education/Service (CERES) is an interdisciplinary academic support unit at Ball State University focused on enhancing research and education on issues of energy usage and conservation. The center was established in 1982 as an addition to the existing Estopinal College of Architecture and Planning. The center currently states the following as its mission: "To maintain ongoing programs for the examination of state-of-the-art energy conservation and end-use practices; To investigate alternative solutions to contemporary energy problems; To develop projections and implications of the results of these solutions; To devise means of implementing these ideas; To disseminate findings to the appropriate publics—professionals, educators, policy planners, students and laypersons."

== History ==
Concerns about environmentalism and conservation became popularized in the 1970s following the successes of the inaugural Earth Day that allowed for a sort of fusion between radical counterculture ideas regarding environmentalism and more mainstream ideas presented by politicians such as Gaylord Nelson. In addition, energy crises, such as the 1973 Oil Crisis and the 1979 Three Mile Island accident caused concern about the way contemporary energy sources were being utilized, prompting some to begin research in alternative forms of energy or better forms of energy conservation. In response, Ball State University started their efforts to implement energy education into the college; in 1979, with funding from the Indiana General Assembly, the university began planning of the Center for Energy Research/Education/Service, with construction beginning in the summer of 1980. Simultaneously, Ball State University began planning for incorporating this sort of education about conservation and energy education into their curriculum, including proposed courses in environmental architecture and in utilizing solar energy. In 1982, CERES was completed and opened for usage for Ball State's campus.

Since its inception in Ball State's campus, CERES has served as a means to incorporate energy education into Ball State's campus. By 1986, even, this had become one of its missions, with the center becoming focused on placing Ball State as a leader in reaching a "sustainable future." The center also had national significance; from the period between 1985 and 1988, CERES was one of only five test laboratories accredited by the Solar Rating and Certification Corporation for their solar research. Going forward, the center has remained an integral part of energy and conservation research and education, both on Ball State's campus and in the greater Muncie community.
