= David Goldfield =

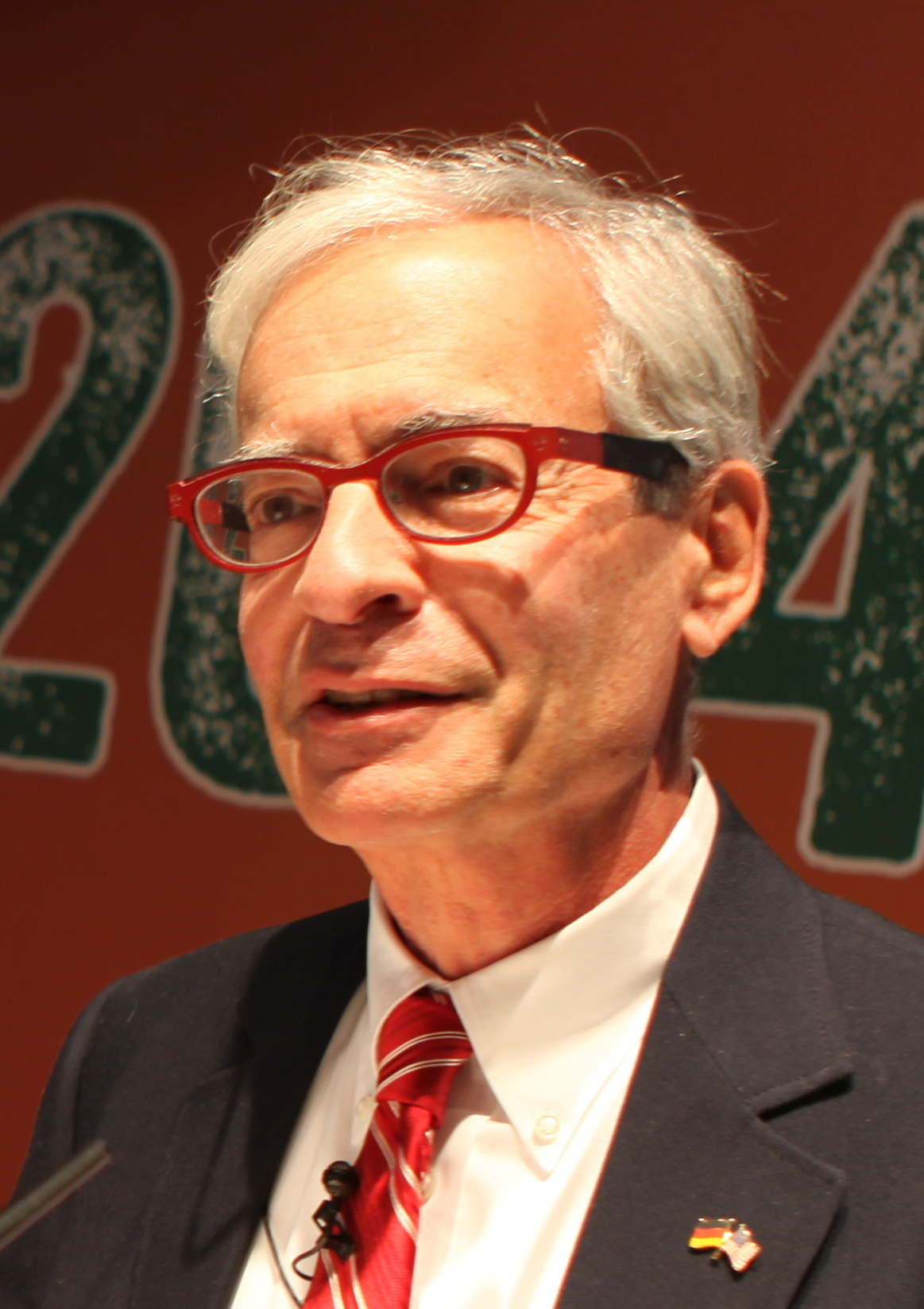
- David Goldfield in 2014
- Education: University of Maryland (Ph.D.)
- Occupations: Historian, Writer, Professor, and Director
- Writing career
- Subjects: American South, American Civil War, urban history
- Notable works: Black, White, and Southern: Race Relations and Southern Culture; Cotton Fields and Skyscrapers; America Aflame: How the Civil War Created a Nation
- Notable awards: Mayflower Award for nonfiction, Outstanding Book Awhard from the Gustavus Myers Center for the Study of Human Rights
- Website: www.davidgoldfield.us

David R. Goldfield is an American historian, writer, film director, and professor. He is a long-time supporter of the Democratic Party. He is the author of sixteen books, including Black, White, and Southern: Race Relations and Southern Culture and Cotton Fields and Skyscrapers. Both of these books were nominated for the Pulitzer Prize. Currently, he is the Robert Lee Bailey Professor of History at the University of North Carolina in Charlotte.

== Education ==
Goldfield is originally from Memphis, Tennessee, but grew up in Brooklyn, New York. He attended the University of Maryland, and earned his PhD in 1970.

== Career ==
Goldfield has held his current position as Robert Lee Bailey Professor of History since 1982. His research interests mainly focus on the American South, Urban History, and the American Civil War. He is the editor of the Journal of Urban History.

Goldfield has served as an expert witness in voting rights cases and consulted for history museums. He also works as an Academic Specialist for the US State Department, which means he leads workshops and seminars that focus on American political culture and help to provide historical context for present-day elections.

He is the author or editor of sixteen books. Two of his books, Black, White, and Southern: Race Relations and Southern Culture and Cotton Fields and Skyscrapers, won the Mayflower Award for nonfiction and were nominated for the Pulitzer Prize. The former book was also awarded the Outstanding Book Award from the Gustavus Myers Center for the Study of Human Rights. Currently, he is working on a book titled, The Gifted Generation: America in the Post War Era.

== Publications ==
- The American Journey Combined Volume (7th Edition), co-author, 2013, ISBN 9780205958528
- America Aflame: How the Civil War Created a Nation, 2011, ISBN 978-1608193905
- The Encyclopedia of American Urban History, editor, 2007, ISBN 978-0761928843
- Southern Histories: Public, Personal, and Sacred, 2003, ISBN 978-0820325613
- Still Fighting the Civil War: The American South and Southern History, 2003
- The South for New Southerners, editor, 1991, ISBN 978-0807819326
- Promised Land: The South Since 1945, 1987, ISBN 978-0882958439
- Cotton Fields and Skyscrapers, 1982, ISBN 978-0807110294
