= Maya Bird-Murphy =

American architectural designer

Maya Bird-Murphy (born 1992), is an American architect, and educator. She is the Founder and Executive Director of Mobile Makers Chicago, a nonprofit that focuses on making design accessible to underrepresented communities. She has received awards and recognition from both AIA and AIGA.

== Education ==
Maya Bird-Murphy was born in 1992 in Chicago, and grew up in Oak Park, a village near Chicago, Illinois. She attended Ball State University in Muncie, Indiana, graduating in 2014 with a Bachelor of Science degree in Architecture. She completed a Masters in Architecture at Boston Architectural College (BAC), graduating in 2017. Her graduate school thesis was Mobile Makers, a project centered on providing low-cost skill-building workshops and educational programming for low-income children ages 8–18.

== Career ==
Maya launched Mobile Makers Chicago as a nonprofit organization in September 2017 right before she graduated. She retrofitted a UPS truck to be a portable studio space which hosts mobile workshops mostly on the South and West sides of Chicago. The goal of Mobile Makers is to build community engagement and to provide young people with the tools and skills they might need in their future.

In June 2022, Mobile Makers was the recipient of the Bulls NBA 75th Anniversary Legacy Project, which funded the permanent space for Mobile Makers in Chicago's Humboldt Park neighborhood. Mobile Makers Chicago received the 2022 Graham Foundation Grant.

Since the conception of Mobile Makers Chicago, Bird-Murphy has simultaneously worked at a variety of other institutions and organizations. She has worked as Architecture Adventure Program Coordinator at the Oak Park Education Foundation (OPEF) and is a part-time faculty member at the School of the Art Institute of Chicago.

== Awards and honors ==
Maya has received the following awards:

- 2018 - Emerging Designer Award from the BAC Alumni Association.
- 2020 - Alan Madison Award from AIA Illinois.
- 2021 - Graduates of the Last Decade (G.O.L.D.) Award from Ball State University's College of Architecture and Planning.
- 2022 - Pierre Keller Award from Hublot.
- 2022 - Dorchester Industries Experimental Design Lab Award from Theaster Gates, Prada Group, and Rebuild Foundation.

In 2018, she was named as an AIGA Design + Diversity Conference National Fellow. The same year, she was featured in The American Institute of Architects' (AIA) Emerging Professionals Exhibition 2018 for Mobile Makers. She was one of the ten who received the 2018 Jason Pettigrew Memorial ARE (Architect Registration Examination) Scholarship from AIA.

She was named in Newcity Magazine's 2022 list of fifty people who have shaped design in Chicago.

== See also ==
- African-American architects
