= William W. Parsons (academic administrator) =

William Woods Parsons
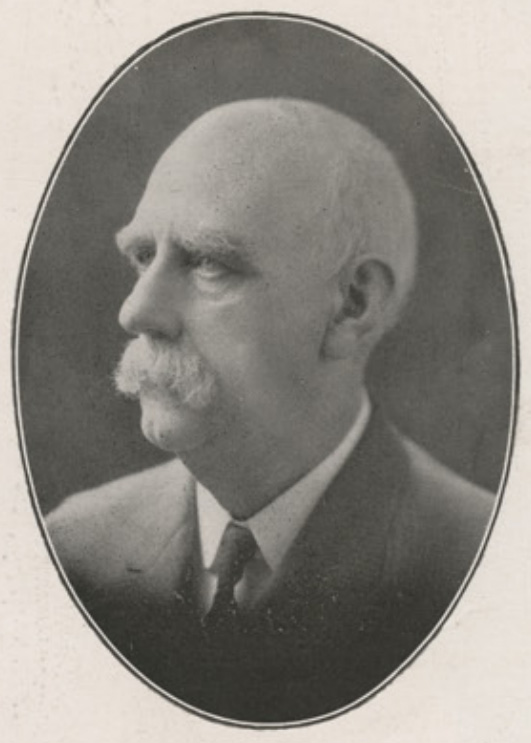
- Parsons pictured in the 1921 edition of The Orient 1921, the Indiana State Normal School yearbook

President of Indiana State Normal School
- In office 1885–1921
- Succeeded by: Linnaeus N. Hines

Personal details
- Born: May 18, 1850 Terre Haute, Indiana
- Died: September 28, 1925 (aged 75) Terre Haute, Indiana
- Education: Indiana State Normal School

William Woods Parsons (May 18, 1850 – September 28, 1925) is best known as being the former president of Indiana State Normal School, now known as Indiana State University.

== Early life ==
William Wood Parsons was born in Terre Haute, Indiana, on May 18, 1850, to Dr. Thomas Parsons and Elizabeth (Ryman) Parsons. In 1857, he began his education at the Vigo County Seminary, which was located on the future site of the Indiana State Normal School. He continued school there until the family moved to Douglas County, Illinois in 1862. After Parsons graduated from Tuscola High School he returned to Terre Haute in 1870 where he became a member of the first class to enter the Indiana State Normal School. After graduating in 1872 he began his teaching career which took him to Tuscola, Illinois followed by Gosport and Indianapolis, Indiana. Parsons returned to Indiana State Normal as a teacher of grammar and composition in 1876.

== Administrative years ==
In 1883, Parsons was promoted to Vice-President of Indiana State Normal School. He became president of the institution on July 1, 1885. Parsons retired in September 1921. William Wood Parsons died in his home in Terre Haute on September 28, 1925.

Preceded by Position created	President of Ball State University; 1918 - 1921	Succeeded by Linnaeus N. Hines
