= Sandra Worthen =

American politician (1937–2022)

- Born: March 12, 1937
- Died: February 13, 2022 (aged 84)

Sandra Damewood Worthen (March 12, 1937 – February 13, 2022) was an American politician from Delaware.

Worthen was born in Washington, D.C., and graduated from Calvin Coolidge High School. She graduated from American University in 1958 and worked at the Library of Congress as a social science analyst. She married John E. Worthen in 1960, and they moved to Boston, Massachusetts, the following year. She attended Harvard University for the Master of Arts in Teaching Program. Worthen taught social studies in Lexington, Massachusetts. Worthen moved with her husband to Newark, Delaware, where she taught high school. Worthen then served in the Delaware House of Representatives from 1973 to 1978 and was a Democrat. In 1978, she resigned to become Governor Pete du Pont's special assistant for education. In 1979, her husband was named President of the Indiana University of Pennsylvania and in 1984, he was named as president of Ball State University in Muncie, Indiana.

Worthen died at IU Ball Memorial Hospital in Muncie on February 13, 2022, at the age of 84.
