= Winfred E. Wagoner =

Winfred Ethestal Wagoner

President of Ball State University
- In office 1943–1945
- Preceded by: L.A. Pittenger
- Succeeded by: John R. Emens

Personal details
- Born: May 30, 1888 Wallace, Indiana
- Died: June 7, 1948 (aged 60) Muncie, Indiana
- Spouse: Glossie Lavonne Goddard
- Children: George Alfred Wagoner

Winfred Ethestal Wagoner (May 30, 1888 – June 7, 1948) was an American educator, best known as the president of Ball State Teachers College, now known as Ball State University, in Muncie, Indiana.

== Biography ==
Wagoner was born in Wallace, Indiana, on May 30, 1888. He married Glossie Goddard in 1914.

Wagoner came to Ball State in 1924 as an assistant professor in the history department. After that he became a secretary-registrar in 1926 before serving as the controller in 1929. Wagoner served as president for six months when President Pittenger resigned in December 1942. He had actually been managing many of the Ball State's affairs while Pittenger was ill. Wagonor passionately lead the college through the turbulent years of World War II. His term as president was extended two more years. After President Emens was inaugurated in 1945, went back to serving as the controller of the college.

Wagoner worked at Ball State for twenty-four years. He died from leukemia on June 7, 1948, and was buried in Rushville, Indiana.

Preceded by L.A. Pittenger	President of Ball State University; 1943–1945	Succeeded by John R. Emens
