= Amy Namowitz Worthen =

American printmaker, historian (born 1946)

- Born: Amy Louise Namowitz; August 13, 1946 (age 80); New York City, New York, U.S.
- Education: Smith College, University of Iowa
- Occupations: Printmaker, engraver, curator, art historian, author
- Spouse: Thomas Fletcher Worthen (m. 1968–2018; death)

Amy Namowitz Worthen (née Amy Louise Namowitz; born 1946) is an American printmaker, engraver, curator, art historian of prints and author. She is the Curator of Prints and Drawings, Emerita at the Des Moines Art Center.

== Biography ==
She was born Amy Louise Namowitz on August 13, 1946, in New York City. Worthen studied at the High School of Music and Art (which is now part of the Fiorello H. LaGuardia High School). Worthen attended Smith College and received a B.A. degree in 1967, studying under Leonard Baskin. She earned an M.A. degree in 1968 at the University of Iowa, studying under Mauricio Lasansky. Additionally she studied lettering-engraving for silversmiths at Sir John Cass College (now London Guildhall University), from 1986 to 1987.

Her engravings are often architectural.

In 1968, she married art historian and Drake University professor, Thomas Fletcher Worthen (1944–2018). Together they lived part time in Venice, Italy where they restored an apartment in a historic palazzo. She has also spent considerable time in England, France, Japan, Istanbul, and India. She was the first chair of the Iowa-Veneto Sister State Committee, established in 1997.

Her prints are included in the permanent collections of the: Smithsonian American Art Museum; the Museum of Fine Arts, Boston; the Cleveland Museum of Art; Iowa State University, Ames; the Van Every Smith Galleries at Davidson College, North Carolina; Grinnell College Museum of Art, Iowa; the Metropolitan Museum of Art; the University of Iowa Stanley Museum of Art; and Harvard University.
