= Rhythmic Circus =

Musical ensemble group

Rhythmic Circus is an eleven member percussive dance and musical ensemble from Minneapolis, Minnesota and the creators of the musical production Feet Don't Fail Me Now! Since 2008, the troupe has performed in over 250 cities worldwide including a six-week tour throughout China and the Edinburgh Fringe Festival, the world's largest art festival. Notable national performances include the Kennedy Center in Washington, D.C., an extended off-Broadway run at New York's New Victory Theater, and the American reality television series America's Got Talent where, despite the audition receiving four "yes" votes to pass through to the next round of competition, the troupe declined to continue.

== Background ==
Rhythmic Circus was officially created in 2007. The Rhythmic Circus mission was to "spread positivity to audiences everywhere through inspirational experiences for all age groups and cultural backgrounds through the sensational blend of theater, music, and dance." Many of the dancers have performed and choreographed together since 2000, however, most have also known each other since childhood, having danced competitively against one another. The musicians have a similar story of supporting one another's music before joining together as a band. Both groups decided to join forces after crossing paths backstage during an Amateur Talent Competition at the Minnesota State Fair.

== The Company ==
The troupe is composed of a vocal percussionist, beat-boxer Aaron "Heatbox" Heaton, a seven-piece band, Root City, which plays music ranging from Funk and Blues to Latin and Salsa, and four tap dancers which utilize percussive dance – a highly rhythmic and musical dance form which employs percussive foot sounds for musical expression and is a cross between modern Irish step-dance and American tap dance. Dance techniques employed by Rhythmic Circus have been likened to a cross between Blue Man Group, Stomp, and Riverdance.

== The Show ==
The show Feet Don’t Fail Me Now!, premiered at the Ritz Theater in Minneapolis in August 2008. The title for the show was adopted from an early 1900s New Orleans chant, and is meant to replicate their spirit of celebration. The show integrates rapid-fire tap, percussive dance, a percussive folding-chair routine, and a tap-beat-box showdown –described as "a sonic ninja battle" - all to a wide variety of musical genres. The show continues to garner rave reviews and sell-out performances to audiences of all ages. The troupe is currently working on a new Christmas program.

== Artists ==
- Ricci Milan - Dancer/Artistic Director
- Nick Bowman – Dancer/Executive Director
- Kaleena Miller – Dancer
- Galen Higgins – Dancer
- Aaron Wiener - Trumpet
- Aaron "Heatbox" Heaton – Vocal Percussionist
- David Feily – Guitar
- Cornell Blanchard –Keyboard/Vocals
- Patrick Nelson – Drums/Tuba/ Vocals
- Dan Ristrom – Bass/Vocals
- Peter Vircks - Saxophone
- Miles Hanson – Sound Design/Audio Engineer
- Mark Ruark – Lighting Design/Production Manager

== Awards ==
- 2011 Sage Award – Outstanding Performance
- 2011 Sage Award – Outstanding Ensemble
- 2012 "Spirit of the Fringe" Award, Edinburgh Fringe Festival

== Musical Numbers ==
- A capella Taps
- We Got It
- Feet Don’t Fail Me Now
- Hit the Road
- I Believe
- World Tour
- Chairs
- Great Big Ending
- Dream Song
- Salsa
- Boogie Monster
- Circus

== Philanthropy ==
In May 2012, Rhythmic Circus partnered with Bremer Bank to produce the video "Step Up!" to raise funds for Second Harvest Heartland, one of the largest food banks in the United States. Bremer donated $1 for every viewing which received over 10,000 views.

== Vision Street Arts ==
In 2014, Nick Bowman founded the non-profit, Vision Street Arts, as an outreach to bring the performing arts to students "of all socio-economic and cultural backgrounds – including under-served, low-income individuals who would otherwise not have access to the performance." It was also created to act as a launching platform for emerging artists "committed to artistic excellence and devoted to positive influence."
