= Jo Ann M. Gora =

American academic administrator

President of Ball State University
- In office 2004–2014
- Preceded by: Blaine A. Brownell
- Succeeded by: Paul W. Ferguson

Chancellor of University of Massachusetts Boston
- In office 2001–2004
- Preceded by: Jean F. MacCormack (Interim)
- Succeeded by: J. Keith Motley (Interim)

Personal details
- Born: New York City
- Spouse: Roy Budd
- Children: 2 (including one stepdaughter)

Jo Ann M. Gora is an American academic and college administrator. She was the 14th President of Ball State University. Before coming to Ball State she was a chancellor of the University of Massachusetts Boston, and, prior to that, the Provost and Vice President for Academic Affairs at Old Dominion University in Virginia.

In the 2011–2012 academic year, Gora was the fifth-highest paid public college president in the United States, with a total compensation of $984,647. In October 2013, Gora announced that she would be retiring on June 30, 2014, after 10 years of service.

== Education ==
Gora earned a bachelor's degree in political science from Vassar College and master's and doctoral degrees in sociology from Rutgers University.

== University of Massachusetts ==
Gora became chancellor in August 2001. This helped lead the way for her presidency at Ball State University.

== Old Dominion University in Virginia ==
Gora was provost and vice-president for academic affairs. In 1995, President James V. Koch of Old Dominion University, took a leave of absence for a semester, leaving Gora as the university's acting president. At that time in Virginia, Gora became the first female president of a doctoral institution in Virginia.

== Ball State University ==
Gora was the president of Ball State University for ten years, from 2004 to 2014. She was appointed by the Ball State University Board of Trustees in May 2004, beginning her presidency in August of that year. Upon her inauguration at Ball State, Gora forwent a traditional ceremony and used the money to establish a scholarship fund.

== Awards and honors ==
- Indianapolis Business Journal named her one of the 19 most influential women in Indiana.
- Gora received the Walter S. Blackburn Award in 2006 because of her work promoting the Ball State University College of Architecture and Planning Indianapolis Center.
- In 2014, the Ball State University Board of Trustees honored Gora as outgoing president by naming the Student Recreation and Wellness Center after her.

=== Publications ===
- The New Female Criminal: Empirical Reality or Social Myth?
- Emergency Squad Volunteers: Professionalism in Unpaid Work

== See also ==
- List of Ball State University Presidents

Preceded by Blaine A. Brownell	President of Ball State University; 2004–2014	Succeeded by Paul W. Ferguson
