= Blaine A. Brownell =

American academic

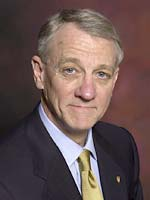

12th President of Ball State University
- In office 2000–2004
- Preceded by: John E. Worthen
- Succeeded by: Jo Ann M. Gora

Personal details
- Born: November 12, 1942 (age 83) Birmingham, Alabama, U.S.
- Spouse: Mardi Brownell
- Education: Washington and Lee University, University of North Carolina at Chapel Hill

Blaine Allison Brownell (born November 12, 1942) is an American university teacher, administrator, and specialist in U.S. urban, southern, and twentieth-century history, and was the 12th president of Ball State University. Author or co-author of seven books and over twenty-five articles, he has been a tenured full professor at four universities.

== Education ==
Blaine Brownell received his early education in the Birmingham, Alabama city school system, and graduated from Ramsay High School. He earned his B.A. degree from Washington and Lee University in Lexington, Virginia and his M.A. and Ph.D. degrees in United States history from the University of North Carolina at Chapel Hill.

== Academic career ==
During 1971–72 Brownell was a senior research fellow at the Institute of Southern History at Johns Hopkins University. He co-founded the Journal of Urban History and was editor from 1976 to 1990. He was department chair, graduate dean, and dean of social and behavioral sciences at the University of Alabama at Birmingham (1974–1990), provost and vice president for academic affairs at the University of North Texas in Denton (1990–1998), and executive director of international programs at the University of Memphis (1998–2000).

=== International work ===
A lifelong interest in international education began with his appointment as the Fulbright Lecturer at Hiroshima University, Japan (1977–78) and continued in a visiting professorship at Sichuan University in China (1987) and appointment as academic specialist for the U.S. Information Agency in Brazil. He also was editor of the International Education Forum (1998–2000) and for over a decade as member and chair of the board of directors of the International Student Exchange Programs in Washington, D.C.

=== Ball State University ===
In 2000, Brownell succeeded John E. Worthen as president of Ball State University in Muncie, Indiana. He also accepted a tenured appointment as Professor of History and Urban Planning.

=== Later career ===
In 2004 he was appointed the first president and CEO of U21 Pedagogica, the academic quality assurance arm of Universitas 21, the U21 global academic consortium of seventeen major research universities, headquartered at the University of Virginia. Subsequently, he was interim dean of business, senior advisor for strategic planning and international programs, and interim provost at the University of South Florida St. Petersburg, and for several years as consultant and advisor to the national universities of the United Arab Emirates for the Minister for Higher Education and Research.

He is now retired and living in Charlottesville, Virginia.

== Works ==
- The Urban Ethos in the South, 1920-1930, 1975. ISBN 0807101575
- Urban America: From Downtown to No Town, 1979. ISBN 0395273978
- The Urban Nation, 1920-1980, 1981. ISBN 0809095416
- Using Microcomputers, 1985. ISBN 0803922914
- Washington and Lee University, 1930-2000: Tradition and Transformation, 2017. ISBN 0807166987

== See also ==
- List of Ball State University Presidents

Academic offices
| Preceded by John E. Worthen | President of Ball State University; 2000-2004 | Succeeded by Jo Ann M. Gora |
