= Benjamin J. Burris =

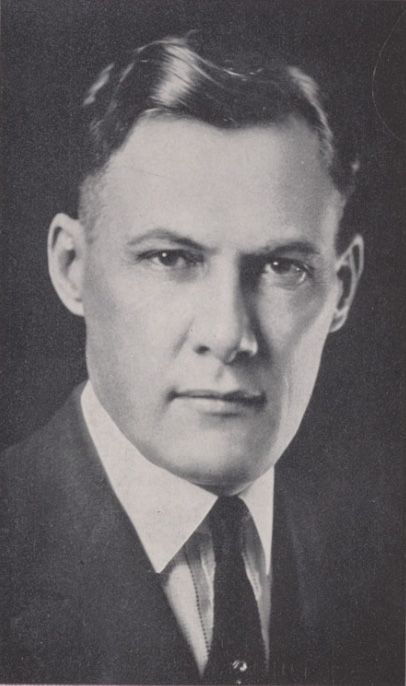

President of Ball State University
- In office 1924–1927
- Preceded by: Linnaeus N. Hines
- Succeeded by: L.A. Pittenger

Personal details
- Born: March 19, 1882 Daviess County, Indiana
- Died: April 26, 1927 (aged 45) Hope, Indiana

Benjamin Jackson Burris (March 19, 1882 – April 26, 1927) is best known for being a past president of Ball State University (then known as Ball Teachers College) and held many different occupations. Burris was once a county attorney, politician, school administrator as well as the first assistant to the state superintendent of public instruction.

== Early life ==
Burris born in 1882, grew up and was raised in southeastern Indiana. In 1906, he graduated from Central Normal College in Danville, Indiana and taught in the area schools while taking classes. He was elected the superintendent of public schools in Daviess County in 1907, making him one of the youngest superintendents of a county in the state. He continued taking courses and in 1911 he graduated from Harrison Law School in Indianapolis, Indiana. Sometime after he left his job as superintendent of Davies County to join the law firm of Padgett and Lewis in Indianapolis.

== Indiana Department of Public Instruction ==
Burris joined the Indiana Department of Public Instruction in 1917 as chief assistant to the superintendent, Horace Ellis. Ellis' popularity fell and was soon replaced by Linnaeus Hines in 1919. Hines named Burris his deputy superintendent. When Hines was named the President of the Indiana State Normal School in 1921, Burris became the new superintendent of the Indiana Department of Public Instruction.

== Ball Teachers College ==
At this time, L.A. Pittenger was elected into the Indiana House of Representatives and became the chairman to the powerful Ways and Means Committee. Eventually Pittenger persuaded the Indiana General Assembly to separate the Ball Teachers College's budget from that of the Indiana State Normal School. Noting that this is the fashion in which other states governed their schools. Once the division was completed, President Linnaeus Hines of the Indiana State Normal School was given the power to appoint the first President of the Ball Teachers College. Burris was named the president of Ball Teachers College beginning the first of December 1924.

=== Presidency (1924 - 1927) ===
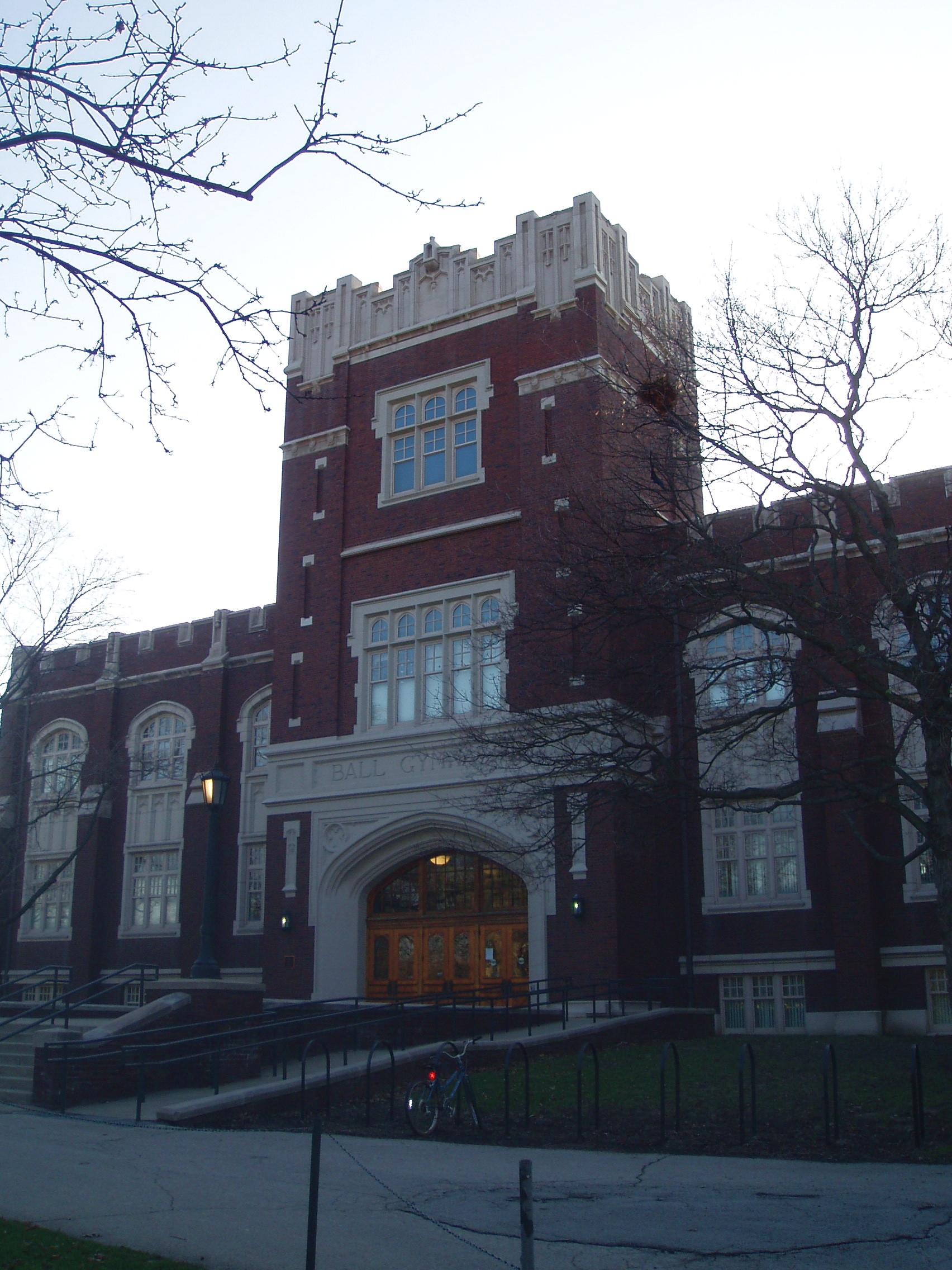
Ball Gymnasium, BSU

During Burris' presidency, enrollment, number of faculty members and departments increased as well as social and intramural activities. Burris had a strong vision for the college and wanted to gain the highest accreditation a college could have as well as building a laboratory school for teacher training. In 1927, shortly after giving a high school commencement speech, Benjamin Burris collapsed and died from a heart attack. L.A. Pittenger was chosen as his successor.

==== Effect on Ball State University ====
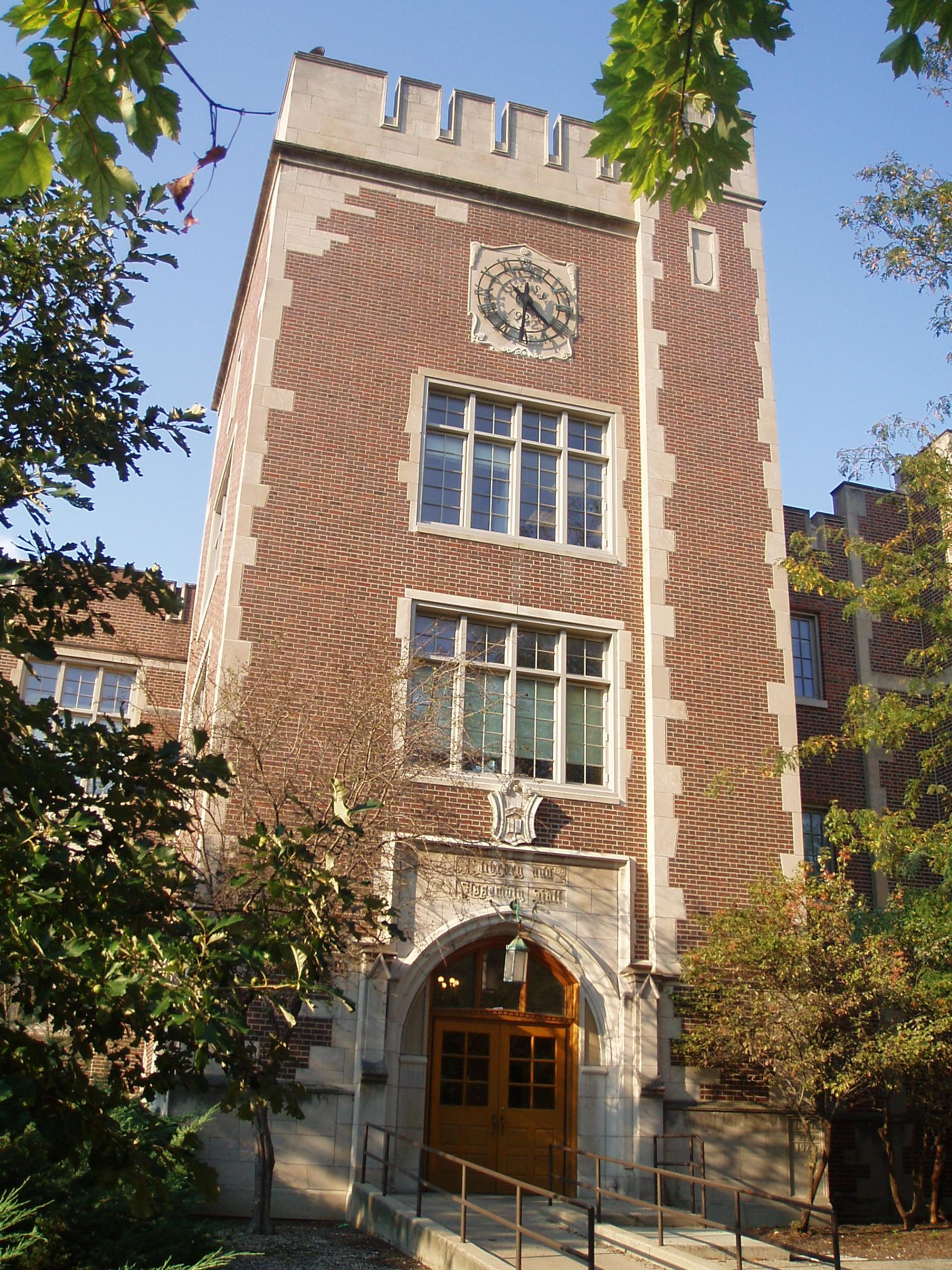
North Quad Building, BSU

- Campus Additions During Presidency
  - Ball Gymnasium (1925)
  - Library and Assembly Hall currently North Quad Building (1926)
  - Lucina Hall (1927)

== Burris Laboratory School ==
In the late 1920s, Ball State needed a place for teaching majors to gain teaching experience and thus built the Burris Laboratory School on the south side of campus along University Avenue. The building was built in the Collegiate Gothic Style and was dedicated in Benjamin Burris' name in 1928. The building remains as a public school serving grades Kindergarten through 12th grade as well as housing the Indiana Academy for Science, Mathematics, and Humanities.

== See also ==
- List of Ball State University Presidents

Preceded by Linnaeus N. Hines	President of Ball State University; 1924 - 1927	Succeeded by L.A. Pittenger
