= Clyde Worthen =

American judoka

- Born: Arizona, United States
- Occupation: Martial artist
- Known for: Proficiency in judo

Clyde Worthen (born May 11, 1944), born in Arizona, United States, is a 6th Degree Black Belt judoka. He was trained by Yoshisada Yonezuka at the Cranford Judo Karate Center.

Worthen started his fighting career as a wrestler and did not start judo until the age of 20. He became known for his "Osoto" and "Hari" moves as a left-handed judoka. He currently teaches judo in New Jersey. Among his students was Steven Mocco, two-time NCAA heavyweight wrestling champion and Olympic hopeful.

Worthen says his mission in judo is "to introduce the sport of judo to as many people as possible, regardless of their abilities and levels of participation. To set a positive example for all whom I may teach or may step on our mat. To teach our young students that effort, self-improvement, courage and sportsmanship are as important as winning".

== Accomplishments In Judo ==
Clyde Worthen lived and trained in Japan for 5 months. He has competed throughout the world. He won the gold medal in the 1976 Pan American Games, and was a member world championship team in 1969, 1971, 1975, and 1977. He was also a member of four U.S. World Teams. Worthen won the National Judo Championship for the third consecutive year at the Senior National Competition in 2004.

Coaching History

- Certified coach of USA Judo.
- Coached many students to national and international level.
- Coached 1992 Olympic team for pre-olympic European training tour.
- Coached U.S. team for Rodriguez Cup in Cuba.

Championships/Awards

- Member of 4 U.S. World Judo teams.
- 18 consecutive New Jersey State championship titles.
- Senior National middleweight champion.
- Pan American gold medalist.
- North American Black Belt middleweight champion.
- Current National Masters middleweight champion 2001–2005.
