= John J. Pruis =

President of Ball State University
- In office 1968–1978
- Preceded by: John R. Emens
- Succeeded by: Richard W. Burkhardt

Personal details
- Born: December 13, 1923 Borculo, Blendon Township, Michigan, U.S.
- Died: January 15, 2016 (aged 92) Muncie, Indiana, U.S.
- Spouse: Angeline R. Pruis
- Education: Western Michigan University

John J. Pruis (December 13, 1923 – January 15, 2016) was an American academic, best known as being a president of Ball State University as well as having a building dedicated in his name on the campus. He went to Western Michigan University for his education and later for a career. Pruis, originally from Holland, Michigan, came to Ball State on July 1, 1968, and retiring in 1978. After his tenure at Ball State, Pruis went on to become the vice president of corporate relations at Ball Corporation, the executive vice president of the George and Frances Ball. Foundation and director of the Ball Brothers Foundation.

== Western Michigan University ==
Pruis was born in the settlement of Borculo, Blendon Township, Michigan, in 1923 and gained his education at Western Michigan University. He then began working at the university upon his graduation. He taught speech for 13 years, was a vice-president for two years, and a secretary to the university's board of trustees for four years.

== Ball State University ==
=== Presidency (1968–1978) ===
Pruis brought many different scholarship opportunities to Ball State such as the Whitinger Scholars Program, John R. Emens Scholars, Martin Luther King, Jr. Scholarships, and Undergraduate research grants. He also established foreign language houses, as well as graduate assistant and doctoral fellow programs. The Ball State University Annual Fund grew from $170,758 to approximately $1.8 million during John J. Pruis' presidency.

John and Angeline Pruis hosted many university and community events on campus and in the Bracken House as well as being involved in the Fellows Society, Quadrangle Society, Beneficence Society, Cardinal Varsity Club, Friends of the Museum of Art and Friends of Bracken Library.

Pruis was married to Angeline R. Pruis. He died on January 15, 2016, at a retirement community in Muncie, Indiana.

== Effect on Ball State University ==
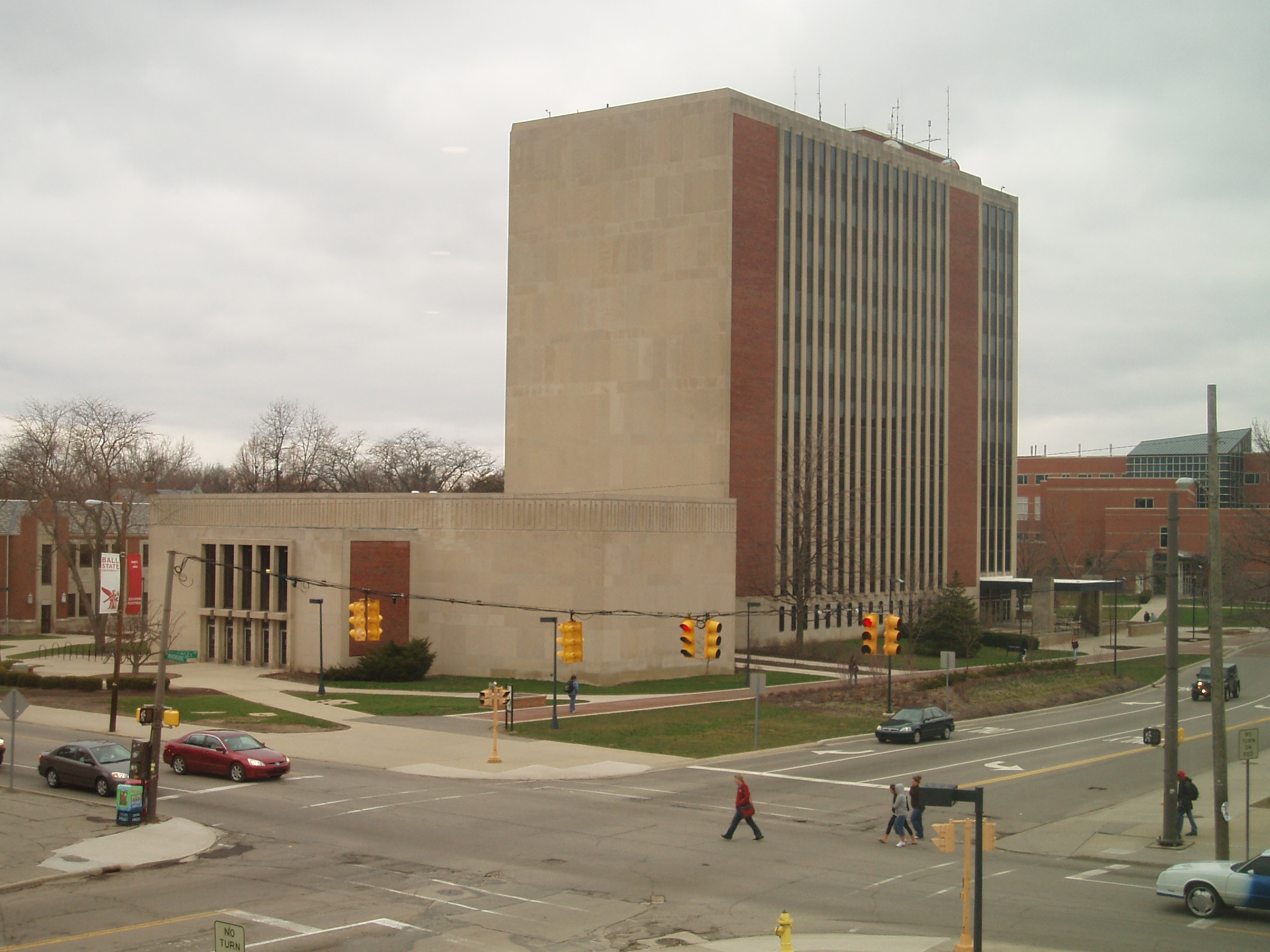
Teachers College Building, BSU

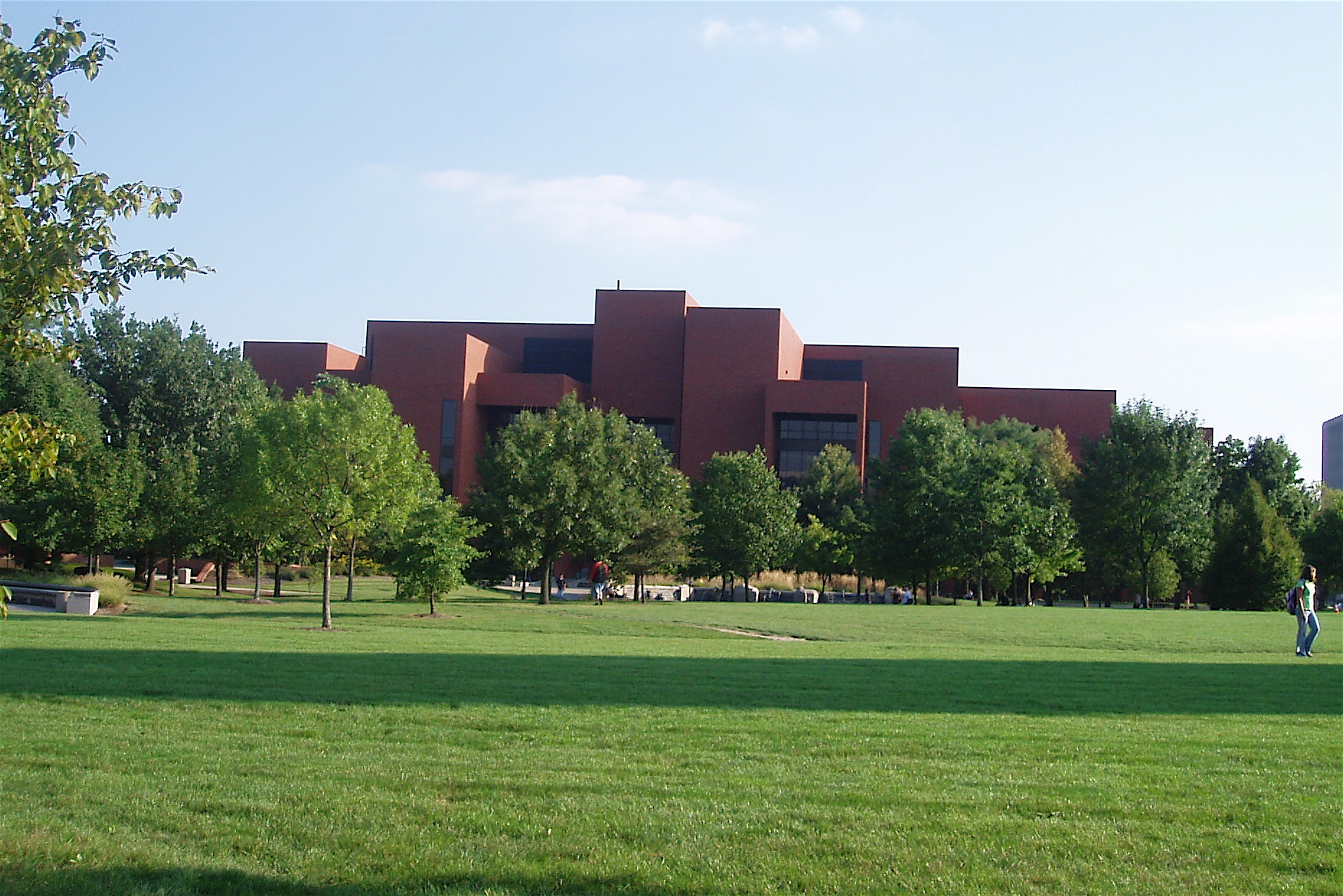
Bracken Library, BSU

- John J. and Angeline Pruis Award for Teaching
- Campus Additions during presidency
  - Cooper Science Building
  - Teachers College Building (1968)
  - Lewellen Pool (1968)
  - Johnson Complex (1969)
  - Carmichael Hall (1969)
  - Pruis Hall (1972)
  - College of Architecture and Planning Building (1972)
  - Bracken Library (1975)
  - Two parking garages
  - Science hall renamed to East Quad Building (Burkhardt Building)

== Pruis Hall ==
John Pruis is one of the many presidents of Ball State to have a building on campus named after him. The building was built during his presidency in 1972 and held the name University Hall until after his term concluded. Pruis Hall is a unique building on campus. A large majority of the buildings on Ball State's Campus are made of red brick with exceptions of the Administration Building having yellow brick, and Elliott Hall and Pruis Hall being made of Indiana Limestone and cement. The architecture firm responsible for the design of Pruis hall was influenced by a grand piano with its strong curves and angular walls. Pruis Hall is located directly southeast of Bracken Library, and is used for large gatherings of people. The building is set up to be more like an auditorium, and this is its only function. The building can hold up to 700 people and hosts Friday Night Movies as well as guest lectures, comedians, and other special events.

== See also ==
- List of Ball State University presidents

Preceded by John R. Emens	President of Ball State University; 1968–1978	Succeeded by Richard W. Burkhardt
