= Worthen Arena =

Multi-purpose arena in Muncie, Indiana, US

John E. Worthen Arena
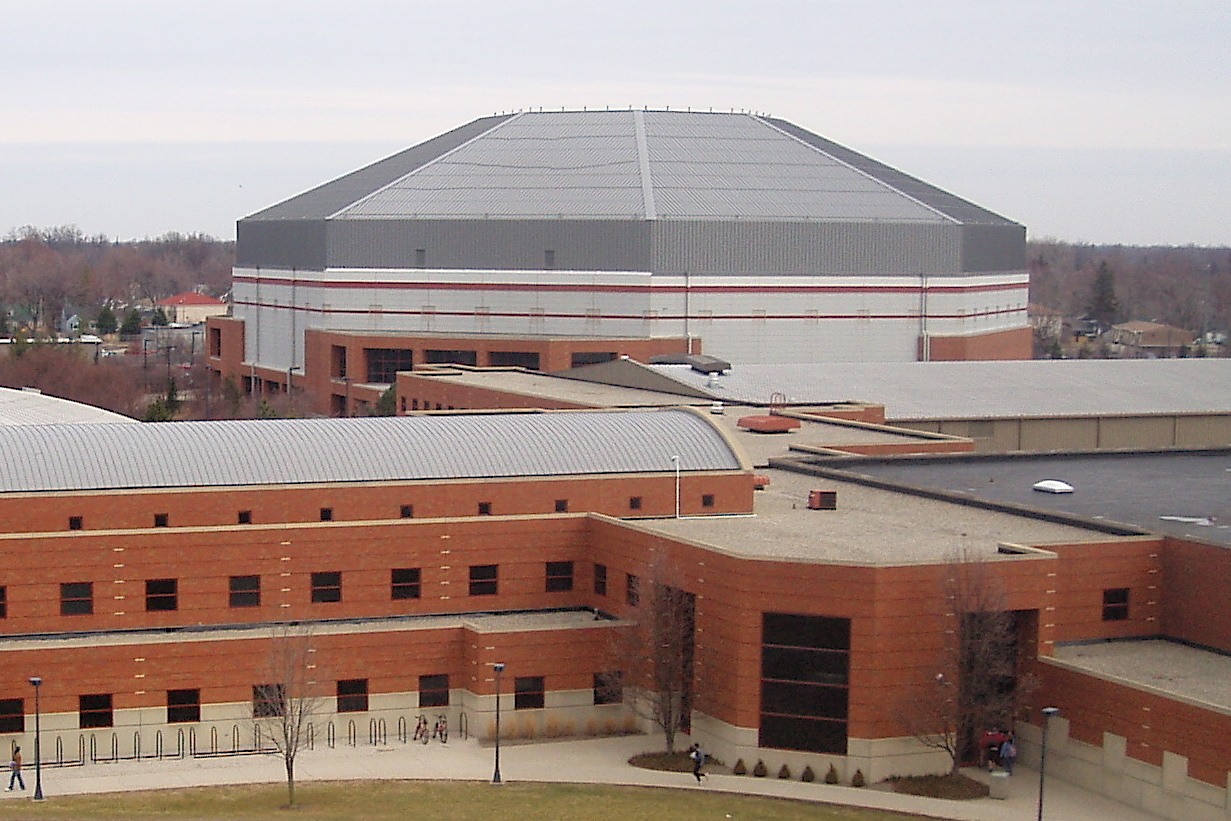
- Interactive map of John E. Worthen Arena
- Location: 1699 W. Bethel Avenue, Muncie, Indiana
- Coordinates: 40°12′25″N 85°24′22″W
- Owner: Ball State University
- Operator: Ball State University
- Capacity: 11,500

Construction
- Opened: 1992
- Architect: Browning Day Mullins Dierdorf

Tenants
- Ball State Cardinals (NCAA); Men's basketball (1992–present); Women's basketball (1992–present); Men's volleyball (1992–present); Women's volleyball (1992–present)

Website
- Official website

John E. Worthen Arena is an arena on the campus of Ball State University in Muncie, Indiana, United States. The arena opened in 1992 and replacing the 6,600-seat Irving Gymnasium as the primary venue for Ball State basketball and volleyball programs. Originally named Ball State Arena or University Arena, it was renamed Worthen Arena in honor of the former university president, John E. Worthen. The arena mainly serves as home to four Ball State Cardinals athletic teams: men's and women's basketball and men's and women's volleyball. The seating capacity is listed at 11,500 people and cost $7.8 million to build.

== Features ==
Worthen Arena is also the site of other events, including concerts (seating capacity 11,500 end-stage, 8,800 270 degree end-stage, 7,200 180-degree end-stage, and 5,500 half-house), trade shows (18,700 square feet (1,740 m^{2}) of space on the arena floor) and other special events. It features eight permanent and six portable concession stands, two permanent souvenir stands, a press room, two loading docks, and an arena lounge. It stands between 95 and 120 feet (29 and 37 m) from the floor to the ceiling.

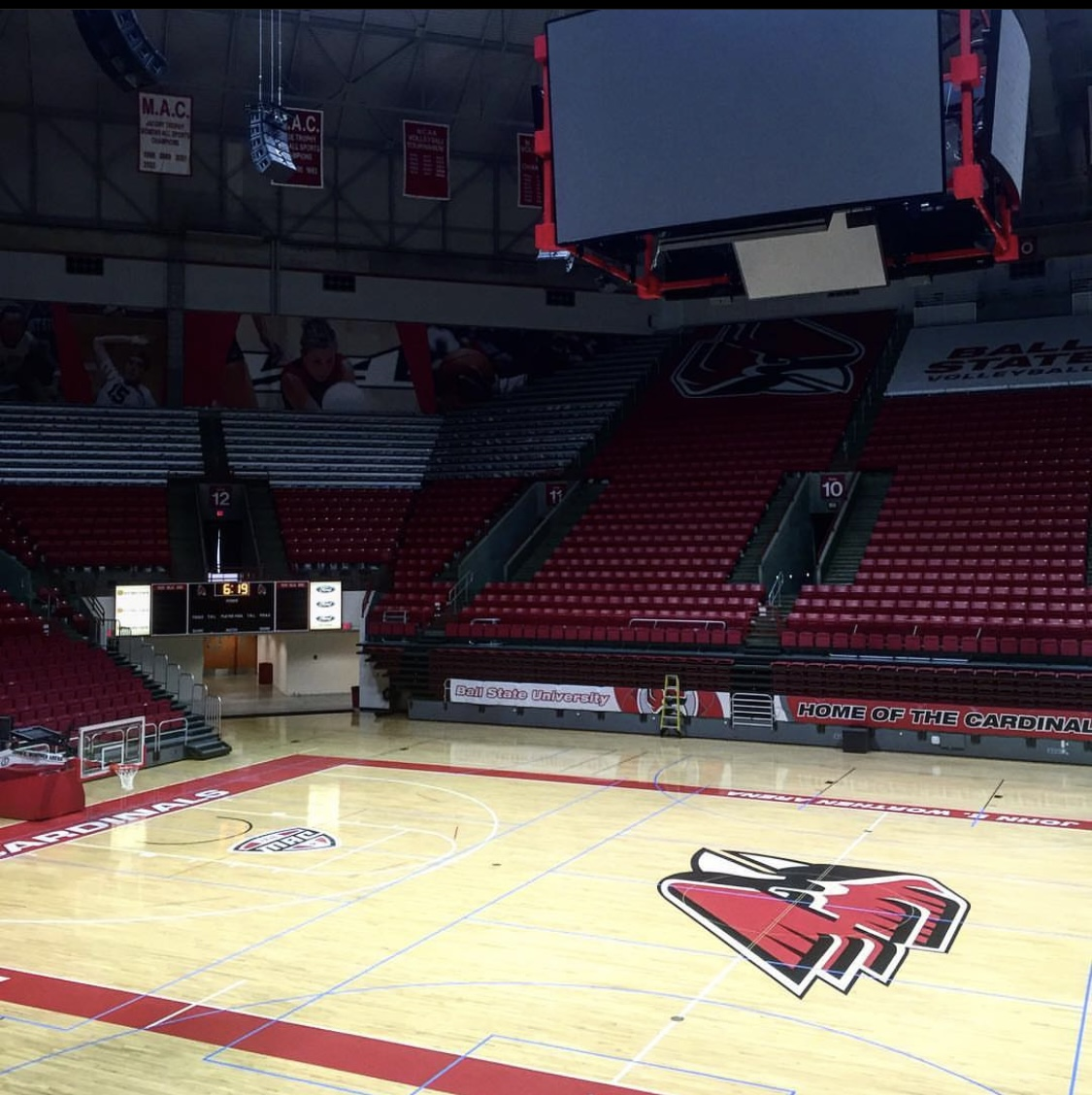
The interior of Worthen Arena

== Upgrades ==
In 2015, a new Daktronics six-panel video board was installed above center court, as well as new scoreboards in the corners of the court. The upgrades were capped off with an upgraded court.

== See also ==
- List of NCAA Division I basketball arenas
- List of indoor arenas in the United States
- List of music venues in the United States
