= Robert P. Bell =

American academic

President of Ball State University
- In office 1981–1984
- Preceded by: Jerry M. Anderson
- Succeeded by: John E. Worthen

Personal details
- Born: September 28, 1918 Charlottesville, Indiana
- Died: February 27, 1992 (aged 73) Muncie, Indiana
- Education: Ball State University; Indiana University

Robert P. Bell (September 28, 1918 – February 27, 1992) was the 10th President of Ball State University and the first university president to be an alumnus. Bell received his degree in Business Education from Ball State Teachers College in 1940 and his master's and doctoral degrees in Business Education from Indiana University afterward. He was president of BSU from 1981 to 1984. The Robert Bell Building on BSU campus, completed in 1984, is named after him.

Academic offices
Preceded by Jerry M. Anderson	Ball State University president 1981–1984	Succeeded by John E. Worthen
