= Richard W. Burkhardt =

American academic administrator

President of Ball State University
- In office 1978–1979
- Preceded by: John J. Pruis
- Succeeded by: Jerry M. Anderson

Personal details
- Born: May 18, 1918 Newton, Massachusetts
- Died: March 4, 2014 (aged 95) Muncie, Indiana
- Spouse: Dorothy Johnson
- Education: Knox College; Harvard University

Richard Wellington Burkhardt (May 18, 1918 – March 4, 2014) was the 8th President of Ball State University, from 1978 to 1979. Richard Burkhardt received his undergraduate degree from Knox College in 1939 and his doctorate from Harvard University in 1945. After serving as director of the division of teacher preparation at Syracuse University, he became dean of the Teachers College while the Teachers College was the only college at Ball State. In 1961, Richard Burkhardt also became the acting dean of the Division of Sciences and Humanities, and then went on to be named the vice president for instructional affairs (later renamed to provost) and dean of the faculties, a position he held for almost 20 years. In addition to this, during the 1978–1979 academic year, Richard Burkhardt served as acting president of the university.

Richard Burkhardt maintained his association with the history department during his years as Ball State's chief academic officer, occasionally teaching a course in modern European history. In 1980, he returned to the history department as a distinguished service professor, and he taught courses in his specialty until his retirement in 1985.

Even in retirement, Burkhardt maintained an active program of research. He collaborated with James K. Danglade on the research and writing of Sixty Years of Outreach and Public Service: A History of Continuing Education at Ball State University, published in 1985. In 1991, he published Eliza Julia Flower: Letters of an English Gentlewoman: Life on the Illinois-Indiana Frontier, 1817-1861, in collaboration with Janet Walker.

Science Hall, one of the oldest buildings on Ball State's campus, was named the Burkhardt Building in his honor.

He died in Muncie, Indiana on March 4, 2014.

== Bibliography ==
- Danglade, James K.; Burkhardt, Richard W. (1985). Sixty Years of Outreach and Public Service: A History of Continuing Education at Ball State University. Muncie, Indiana: Ball State University.
- Hayashi, Tetsumaro; Walker, Janet R.; Burkhardt, Richard W. (1991). Eliza Julia Flower: Letters of an English Gentlewoman: Life on the Illinois-Indiana Frontier, 1817-1861. Muncie, Indiana: Ball State University. ISBN 978-0-937-99420-7.

Academic offices
Preceded by John J. Pruis	Ball State University president 1978–1978	Succeeded by Jerry M. Anderson
