= Linnaeus N. Hines =

Linnaeus Neal Hines
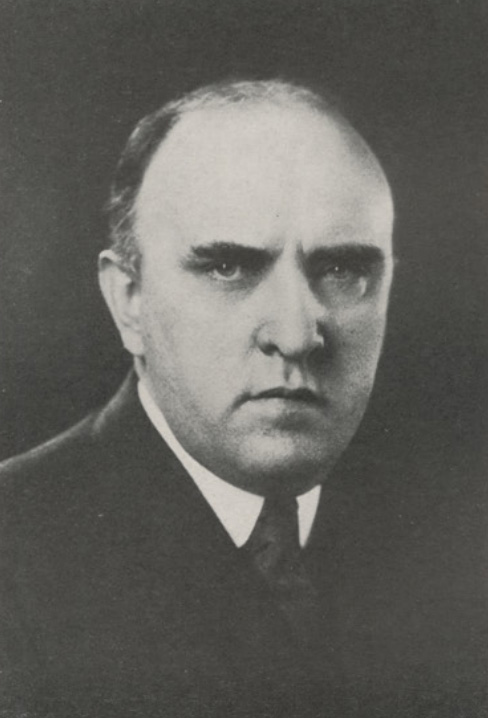
- Hines pictured in The Orient 1923, Ball State yearbook

President of Ball State University
- In office 1921–1924
- Preceded by: William W. Parsons
- Succeeded by: Benjamin J. Burris

23rd Indiana Superintendent of Public Instruction
- In office March 15, 1919 – October 1, 1921
- Governor: Warren T. McCray; Emmett Forest Branch
- Preceded by: Horace D. Ellis
- Succeeded by: Benjamin J. Burris

Personal details
- Born: February 12, 1871 Carthage, Missouri, U.S.
- Died: July 14, 1936 (aged 65) Terre Haute, Indiana, U.S.
- Education: Indiana University

Linnaeus Neal Hines (February 12, 1871 – July 14, 1936) is best known as being a former president of Indiana State University from 1921 to 1934 and its Eastern Division, later known as Ball State University from 1921 to 1924. He was also the Indiana Superintendent of Public Instruction from 1919 to 1921.

== Early life ==
Hines was born on February 12, 1871, in Carthage, Missouri. He grew up and was educated in Noblesville, Indiana. He graduated from Indiana University Bloomington in 1894. He enrolled at Graduate School of Cornell University to take further post graduate work in 1899. Hines taught high school mathematics for seven years in Evansville and Indianapolis. He spent the next eighteen years as superintendent of schools in Union City, Hartford City, and Crawfordsville, Indiana. In 1908, he earned a master's degree from Indiana University.

== Administrative years ==
=== Superintendent ===
After teaching in high school Hines spent the next eighteen years as superintendent of schools in Union City, Hartford City, and Crawfordsville, Indiana. In 1908, he earned a master's degree from Indiana University. Hines served as Indiana Superintendent of Public Instruction from 1919 until he assumed the position of president at Indiana State Normal School in 1921.

=== Indiana State Normal School ===
Linnaeus Hines became the president of Indiana State University at Terre Haute and its Eastern Division at Muncie on October 1, 1921. Hines pursued programs important to the growth of the school. He promoted the development of the rural training schools at both institutions. With Hines as president the institution expanded to become the Indiana State University and the Eastern Division was charted as the Ball State Teachers College in 1929. Because of the improved programs of Indiana State earned accreditation by the North Central Association of Colleges in March 1930. In June 1933, Hines resigned as president of Indiana State University after twelve years of service. He continued to service as Director of Extension and Placement at Indiana State University after his retirement. Linnaeus Neal Hines died in Terre Haute, Indiana on July 14, 1936.

Preceded by William W. Parsons	President of Ball State University; 1921 - 1924	Succeeded by Benjamin J. Burris
