= Estopinal College of Architecture and Planning =

Academic college in Muncie, Indiana, US

R. Wayne Estopinal College of Architecture and Planning
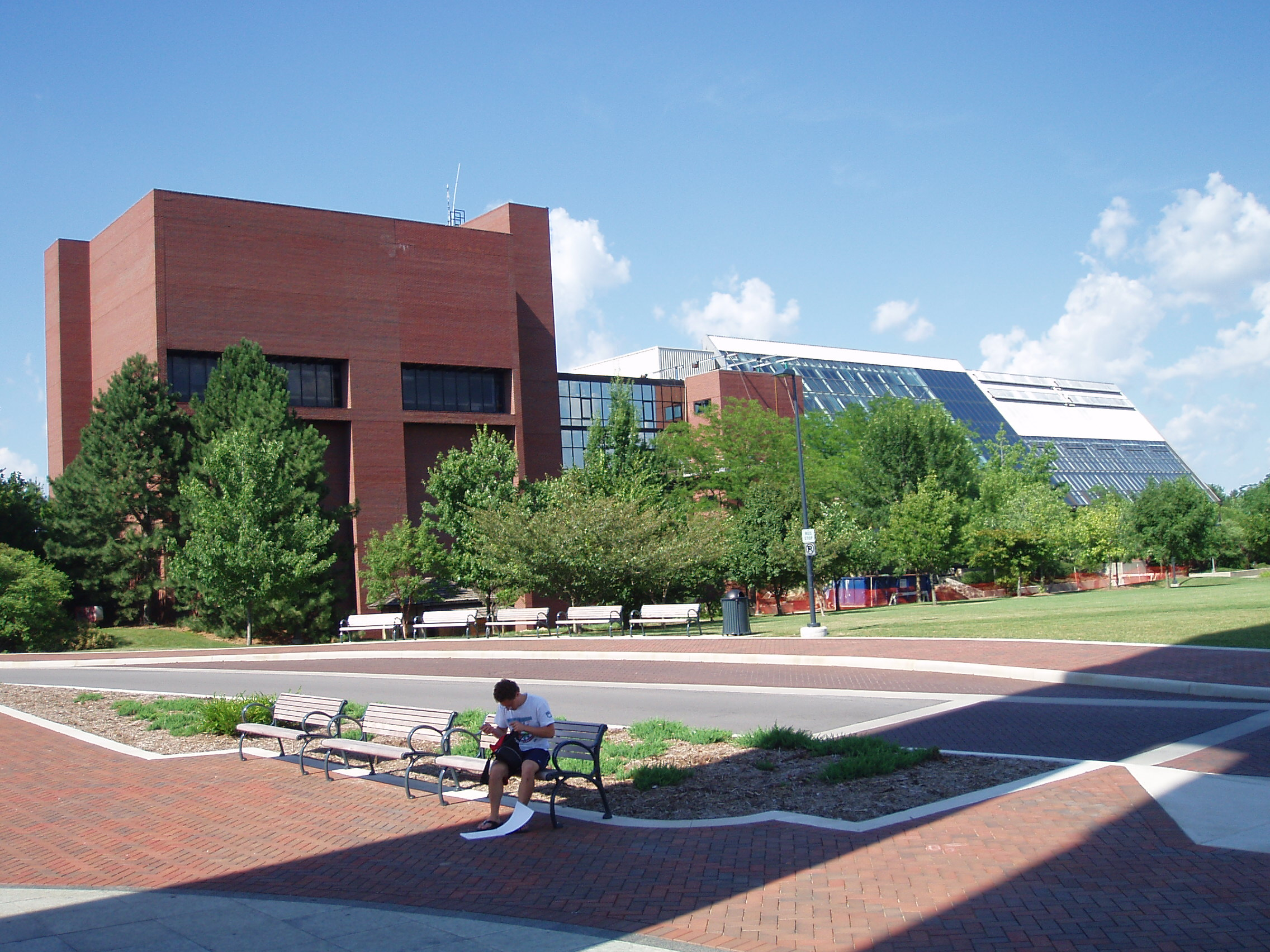
- Architecture Building in 2006
- Type: Public (state university)
- Established: 1965; 61 years ago
- Parent institution: Ball State University
- Accreditation: LAAB-ASLA, NAAB, PAB
- Dean: David Ferguson
- Location: Muncie, Indiana, U.S. 40.204517°N 85.407007°W
- Architect: Birkey Associates & Crumlish/Sporleder and Associates (Brutalism style)
- Website: www.bsu.edu/cap

The R. Wayne Estopinal College of Architecture and Planning, commonly referred to as CAP, is one of seven academic colleges of Ball State University based in Muncie, Indiana, with a satellite facility in Indianapolis. The college offers degrees in architecture, landscape architecture, urban planning, historic preservation, urban design, construction management, and interior design. CAP was established in 1965.

The Estopial College of Architecture and Planning is located in the Architecture Building on the main campus. It holds the architecture library, labs, offices, studios, classrooms, a lecture hall, a resource center, and a gallery. It also houses the Ball State Center for Energy Research/Education/Service (CERES).

Ball State University offers the only PAB (Planning Accreditation Board) accredited Master of Urban and Regional Planning (MURP) & Bachelor of Urban Planning and Design (BUPD) in the state of Indiana. The MURP program has been continuously accredited since 1993 and the BUPD program has been continuously accredited since 1995. CAP also houses the only professionally accredited Master of Landscape (MLA) program in Indiana.

In 2019, the college was named in honor of alumnus R. Wayne Estopinal, who served on the university's board of trustees from 2011 until 2018.

== History ==
In the mid-1960s, the Indiana General Assembly approved the development of a state-assisted architecture program at what was then Ball State Teacher's College. On March 23, 1965, the basis of the College of Architecture and Planning opened its doors in a converted reserve naval armory just north of the site of the current CAP building. CAP began with four instructors and only offered degrees in Architecture. In 1972, the west portion of the existing building was built, and an addition was added in 1980.

On June 12, 2019, the Ball State University Board of Trustees approved naming the College of Architecture and Planning in honor of alumnus R. Wayne Estopinal, who served on the university's board of trustees from 2011 until his death in 2018.

== First year program ==
All entry-level students enrolled in CAP are subjected to a common course of study. Students entering the First Year Program will take classes introducing the professions in architecture, landscape architecture, and urban planning. Students also take three courses: two design studios and one design communication media class. CAP 101 and CAP 102 are design studio courses to introduce environmental design and planning. CAP 161 is a design media course that develops students' communication of ideas through diagramming, illustrating, and other forms of media. The first class of 32 students graduated in 1971.

== Rankings and recognitions ==
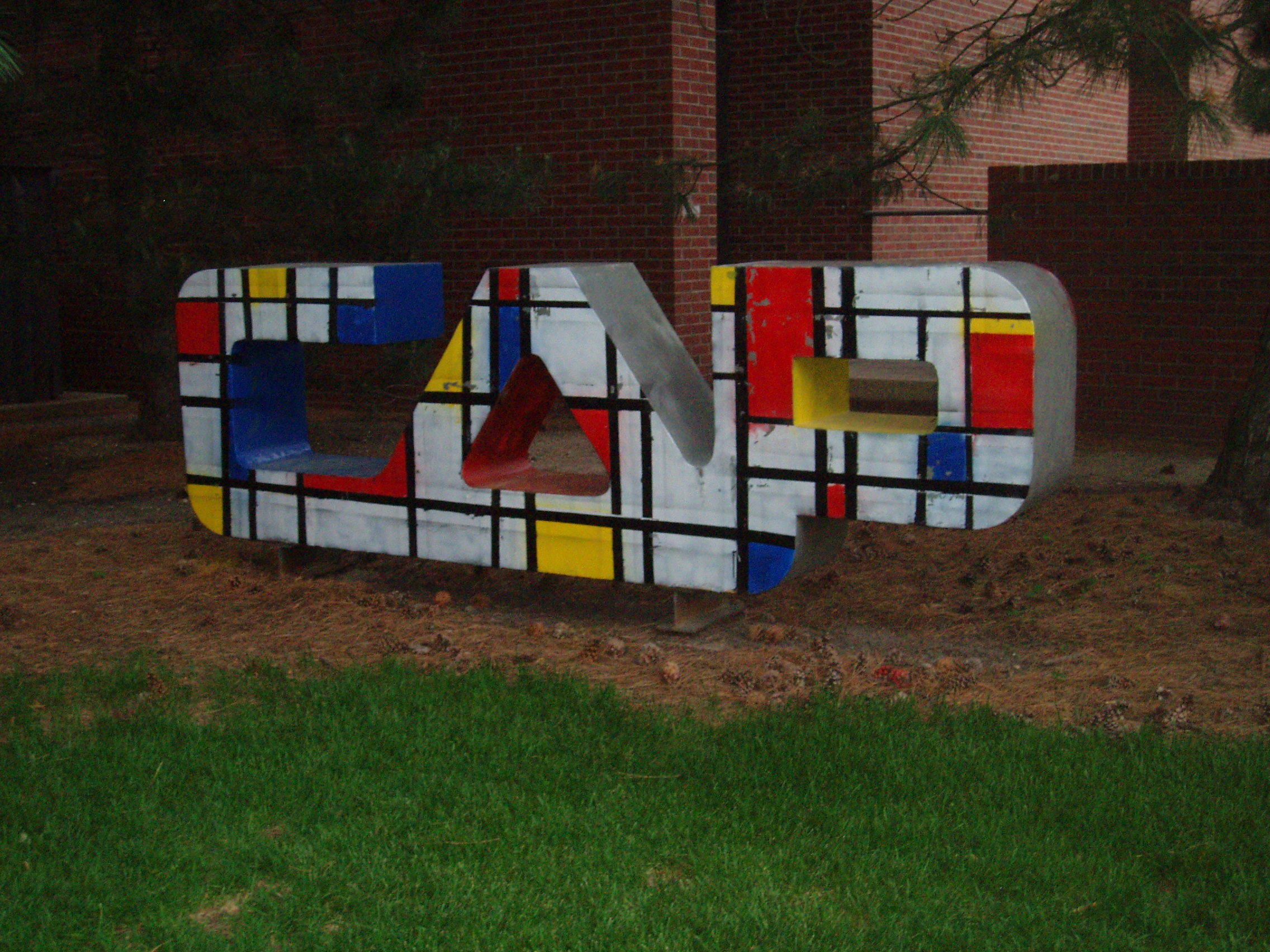
By tradition, the "CAP Sign," near the intersection of Neely and McKinley Avenues sports a new paint scheme each academic year.

- Architecture, landscape architecture, and urban planning are blended in a design college, and Ball State is unique in providing studios for urban planning.
- Several CAP faculty members have been named fellows, presidents, officers, or board members of national professional organizations.

Architecture

- The Department of Architecture was ranked among the nation's top 15 architecture programs in the 2003 Almanac of Architecture and Design. The rankings were based on the hiring experiences of leading U.S. architecture firms, which cited programs that produced the most professional, best-prepared graduates over the past five years.
- Ball State was cited as a national model for architecture education and practice in a special report by the Carnegie Foundation for the Advancement of Teaching.
- Ball State is a three-time winner of the American Institute of Architects (AIA) Education Honor Award
- Community-Based Projects earned a national Community Design Program Award from the Association of Collegiate Schools of Architecture for combining "in-the-field" education with public service.
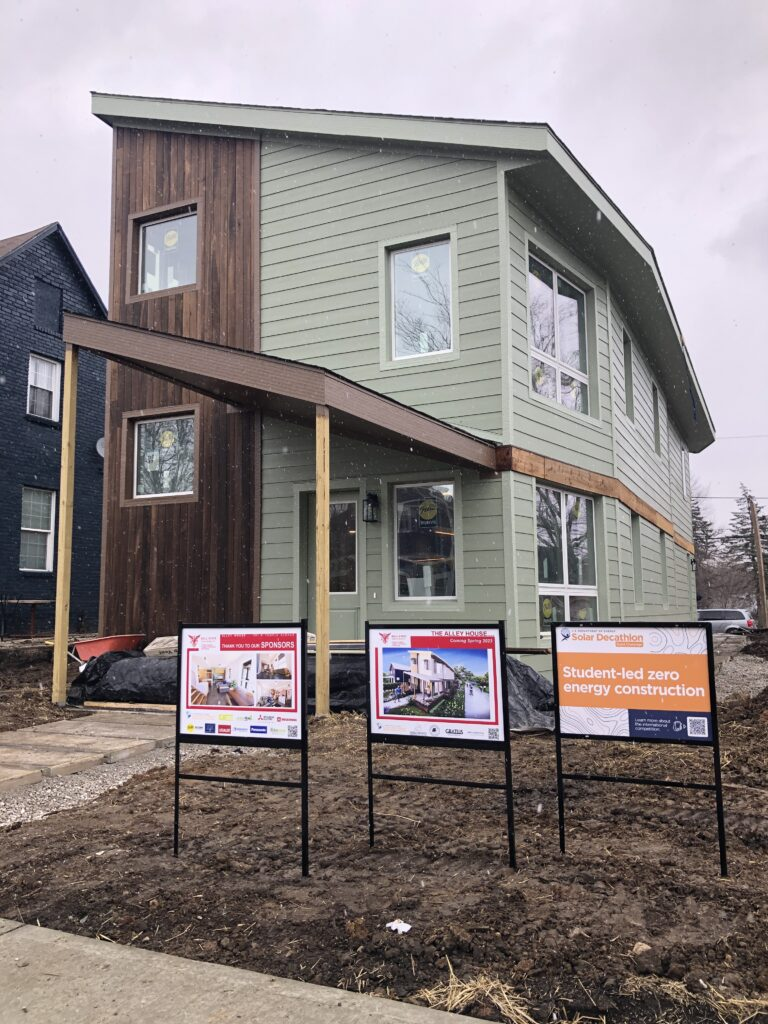
- The “Alley House,” is a project for the U.S. Department of Energy Solar Decathlon® 2023 Build Challenge. A multi-disciplinary group of CAP students and faculty have been working since the Fall 2021 semester on this five-semester-long project for the Solar Decathlon.
  Ball State's ECAP was named the 2023 Build Challenge Overall Winner during the Solar Decathlon Competition for their Alley House submission.

Landscape Architecture

- In its 2009 edition of "America's Best Architecture & Design Schools", the journal DesignIntelligence ranked Ball State's undergraduate landscape architecture program eighth in the nation and its graduate landscape architecture program fifth.
- The 2007 edition of "America's Best Architecture and Design Schools" named Malcolm Cairns, FASLA, Professor of Landscape Architecture, and past Chair of the Landscape Architecture, as one of the 2007 landscape architecture educators of the year.

Urban Planning

- The Muncie Urban Design Studio became the only university-based studio featured in a national online catalog of affordable housing designs, and MUDS has shared Indiana's top preservation award.
- Planetizen 2007 Guide to Graduate Urban Planning Programs ranked Ball State's Historic Preservation 7th among other preservation degrees.
- Planetizen 2007 Guide to Graduate Urban Planning Programs ranked Ball State's Urban Planning program 17th nationwide
- Planetizen 2023 Guide to Graduate Urban Planning Programs ranked Ball State's Urban Planning program 9th in the Midwest
- Planetizen 2023 Guide to Graduate Urban Planning Programs ranked Ball State's Urban Planning program 10th in Top Small City Programs (Cities with less than 75,000 people in metropolitan areas with less than 1 million)

== Extensions ==
=== CAP: INDY ===
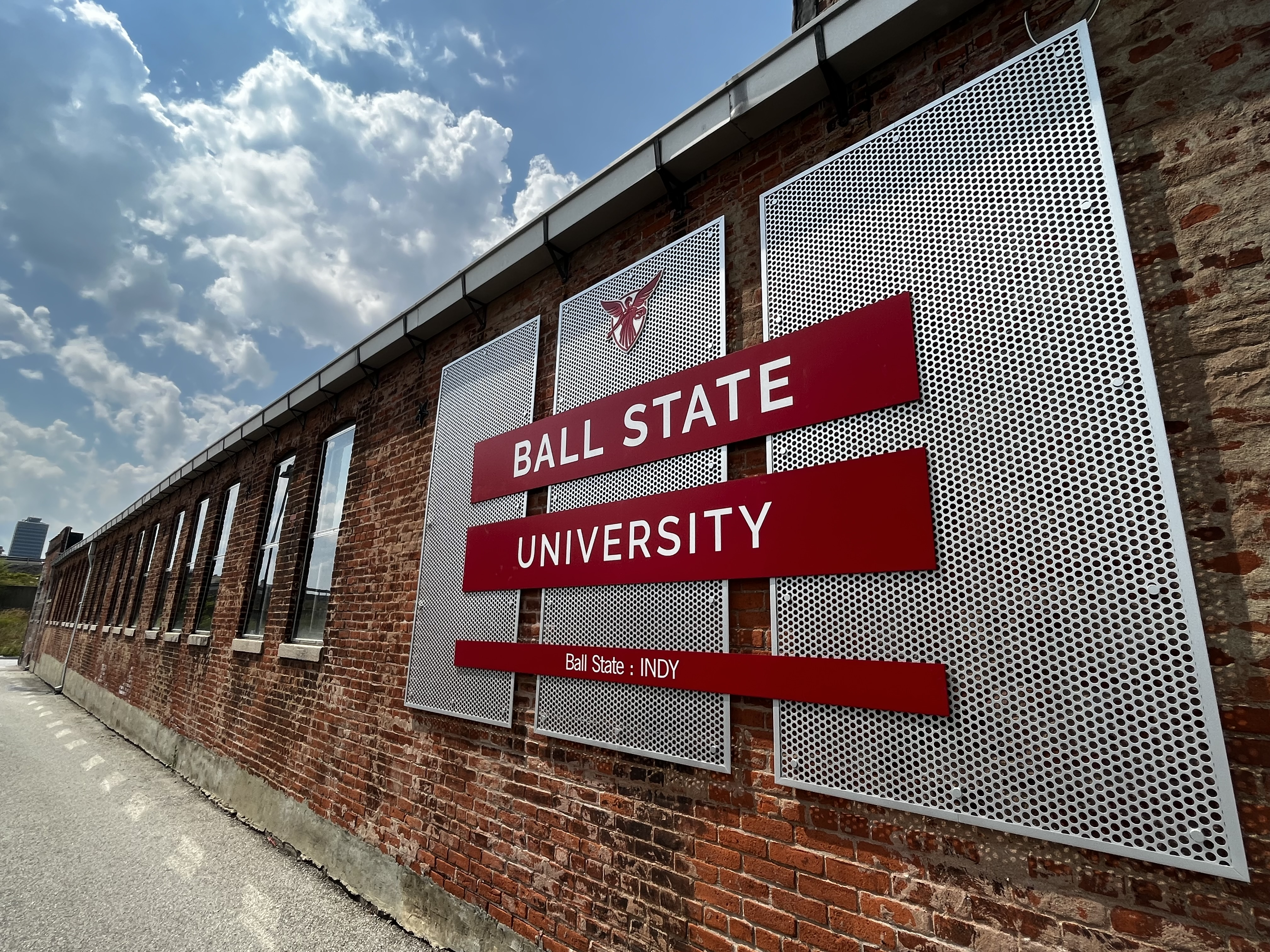
The college's Indianapolis extension in 2023

In 2001, the College of Architecture and Planning opened the Indianapolis Center (CAP: IC), a university-based design center, in downtown Indianapolis. The main goal of the center was to help change and recover urban spaces and to make models for sustainable urban life. In 2006 CAP:IC became a partner in the larger Ball State Indianapolis Center. In 2016, CAP moved to the Platform across from the City-County Building and named its new space the CAP: INDY Connector in light of its mission to develop, support, and sustain connections between College students, faculty, and alumni with professionals, firms, and organizations throughout the City of Indianapolis. In 2019, the college moved again, this time to 25 N. Pine St. The center provides immersive learning opportunities for students while working on community projects and is home to the graduate-level Master of Urban Design program, as well as, the final year of the Master's Degree in Architecture program.

Major Events

- Regional Session of the Mayors' Institute on City Design, 2017
- National AIA Leadership Institute, Regional Venue, 2016

==== CAP:IC Projects ====
- East Washington Street Vision Plan
- Indianapolis Regional Center Design Guidelines
- Speedway Speedzone Development - Development for the areas just south of the Indianapolis Speedway
- Historic Meridian Park Neighborhood Workshop
- Alice Carter Place Park
- Herron Resuse Study
- Historic Irvington Neighborhood Plan
- UNWA Neighborhood Plan
- Central State Reuse Study
- Indianapolis Regional Center Plan 2020

==== Awards ====
- NUVO Cultural Vision Award, NUVO Newsweekly, 2004
- Digital Education Achievement Award, Center for Digital Education, 2004
- Hoosier Planning Award, Indiana Chapter of the American Planning Association, 2009
- National Planning Award, American Planning Association, 2010

=== CAP Asia ===
CAP Asia is a ten-week field study that is offered during the spring semester of every other year. Graduate and undergraduate students travel extensively through many South Asia countries and cities working "hand in hand with local schools, professionals, and educators" on collaborative projects rooted in both design and planning. Nihal Perera is the director for this program. The program is made possible through Ball State University's Immersive Learning initiative that was implemented by former University President Jo Ann M. Gora.

== Notable alumni ==
- Maya Bird-Murphy, architect and educator
- Craig W. Hartman, architect, design partner at SOM
