= Jerry M. Anderson =

9th President of Ball State University

President of Ball State University
- In office July 1, 1979 – February 2, 1981
- Preceded by: Richard W. Burkhardt
- Succeeded by: Robert P. Bell

Personal details
- Born: September 16, 1933 Amery, Wisconsin
- Died: June 14, 2008 (aged 74) Amery, Wisconsin
- Education: University of Wisconsin-River Falls; Michigan State University; Northern Illinois University

Jerry Maynard Anderson (September 16, 1933 – June 14, 2008) was the 9th President of Ball State University and a speech and dramatics professor. He assumed the position on July 1, 1979, and served until his resignation in February 1981. Anderson was previously Vice Chancellor and Chief Academic Officer at the University of Wisconsin–Oshkosh. He later served as vice president of development of Concordia College, Moorhead. where he also taught for many years and even wrote a book with then president Paul Dovre titled Readings in argumentation.

Born in Amery, Wisconsin, Anderson is an alumnus of University of Wisconsin–River Falls, Michigan State University and Northern Illinois University. He holds a M.Sc. and Ph.D. in speech. He also taught at the University of Maine, Michigan State University, Central Michigan University and Washington State University. He was married to Betty Lou Schultz and has two sons. Anderson died at his home in Amery in 2008.

Academic offices
Preceded by Richard W. Burkhardt	Ball State University president 1979–1981	Succeeded by Robert P. Bell
