= John E. Worthen =

President of Ball State University
- In office 1984–2000
- Preceded by: Robert P. Bell
- Succeeded by: Blaine A. Brownell

President of Indiana University of Pennsylvania
- In office 1979–1984

Personal details
- Born: July 15, 1933 (age 93) Carbondale, Illinois, U.S.
- Spouse: Sandra Damewood (m. 1960; died 2022)
- Children: 2
- Education: Northwestern University; Columbia University; Harvard University (EdD)

John E. Worthen (born July 15, 1933) is a retired college administrator who served as the 11th President of Ball State University and the 20th President of Indiana University of Pennsylvania.

== Background ==
He married Sandra Damewood in 1960. She served as a member of the Delaware House of Representatives from 1973 to 1978, when she resigned to become special assistant for education to Governor Pete du Pont.

Worthen was president of Indiana University of Pennsylvania an administrative official at the University of Delaware as well as serving as the dean of men at American University. He worked at IUP from 1979 to 1984, and at Ball State from 1984 to 2000. Worthen earned a bachelor's degree from Northwestern University in psychology, a master's degree from Columbia University, and a Doctor of education degree from Harvard University.

== Ball State University ==
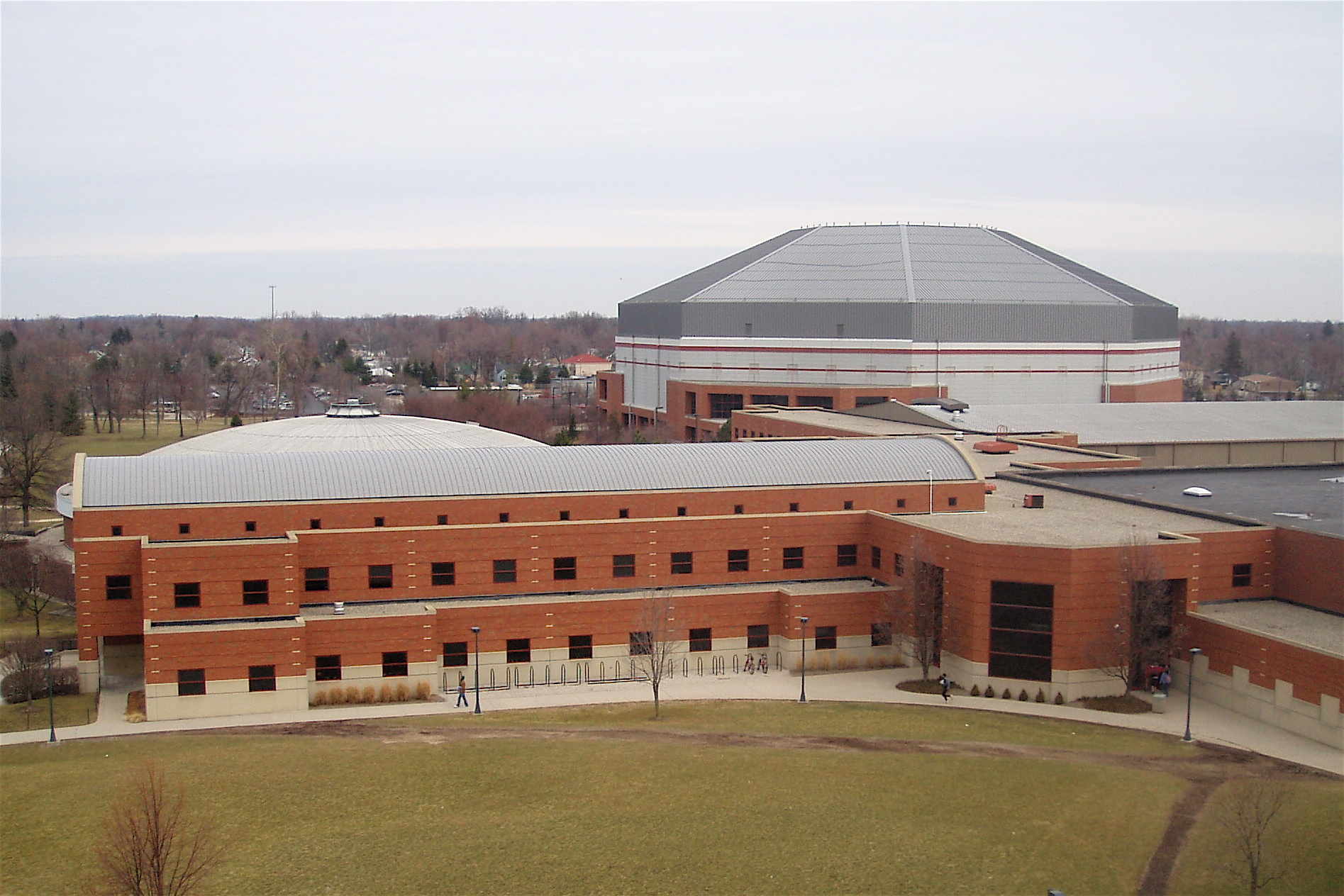
Health and Physical Activity Building with Worthen Arena, BSU

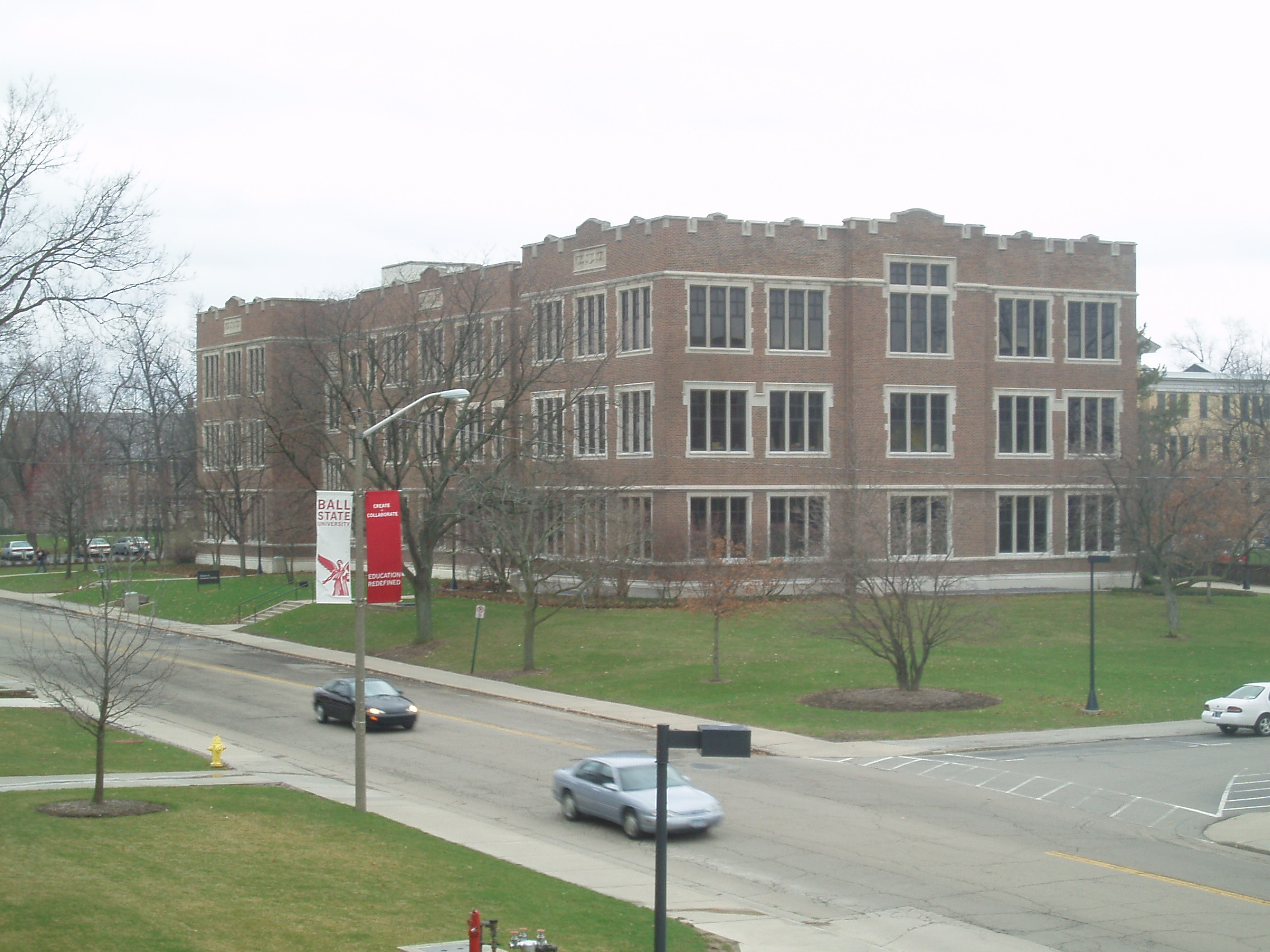
Burkhardt Building, BSU

=== John E. Worthen Arena ===
In 1991, Ball State finished construction on University Arena to replace the aging facility, Irving Gymnasium. The arena holds 11,500 people and is home to the men and women's basketball and volleyball teams.

== See also ==
- List of Ball State University Presidents
- John E. Worthen Arena

Preceded by Robert P. Bell	President of Ball State University; 1984–2000	Succeeded by Blaine A. Brownell
