= Fencing at the 2004 Summer Olympics – Women's sabre =

Women's sabre at the Games of the XXVIII Olympiad
- Venue: Helliniko Olympic Complex
- Date: August 17, 2004

These are the results of the women's sabre competition in fencing at the 2004 Summer Olympics in Athens. A total of 24 women competed in this event. Competition took place in the Fencing Hall at the Helliniko Olympic Complex on August 17.

== Tournament results ==
The field of 24 fencers competed in a single-elimination tournament to determine the medal winners. Semifinal losers proceeded to a bronze medal match. As there were less than 32 entrants in this event, eight fencers had byes in the first round.

Round of 32
Madoka Hisage (JPN)	15
Orsolya Nagy (HUN)	14
Yelena Jemayeva (AZE)	15
Élora Pattaro (BRA)	8
Cătălina Gheorghițoaia (ROU)	15
Nafi Toure (SEN)	6
Zhang Ying (CHN)	15
Alejandra Benítez (VEN)	9
Cécile Argiolas (FRA)	15
Darya Nedeshkowskaia (UKR)	9
Louise Bond-Williams (GBR)	15
Susanne Koenig (GER)	13
Ana Faez Miclin (CUB)	15
Lee Shin-Mi (KOR)	13
Emily Jacobson (USA)	15
Chow Tsz Ki (HKG)	11

Round of 16
Mariel Zagunis (USA)	15
Madoka Hisage (JPN)	13
Yelena Jemayeva (AZE)	15
Gioia Marzocca (ITA)	6
Cătălina Gheorghițoaia (ROU)	15
Aleksandra Socha (POL)	12
Zhang Ying (CHN)	15
Anne-Lise Touya (FRA)	12
Tan Xue (CHN)	15
Cécile Argiolas (FRA)	11
Yelena Nechayeva (RUS)	15
Louise Bond-Williams (GBR)	12
Sada Jacobson (USA)	15
Ana Faez Miclin (CUB)	4
Léonore Perrus (FRA)	15
Emily Jacobson (USA)	13

Quarterfinals
Mariel Zagunis (USA)	15
Yelena Jemayeva (AZE)	11
Catalina Georghitoaia (ROU)	15
Zhang Ying (CHN)	13
Tan Xue (CHN)	15
Yelena Nechayeva (RUS)	7
Sada Jacobson (USA)	15
Léonore Perrus (FRA)	11

Semifinals
Mariel Zagunis (USA)	15
Cătălina Gheorghițoaia (ROU)	7
Tan Xue (CHN)	15
Sada Jacobson (USA)	12

Gold medal final
Mariel Zagunis (USA)	15
Tan Xue (CHN)	9
Bronze medal final
Sada Jacobson (USA)	15
Cătălina Gheorghițoaia (ROU)	7

== Results ==
Rank	Fencer	Country
1st place, gold medalist(s)	Mariel Zagunis	United States
2nd place, silver medalist(s)	Tan Xue	China
3rd place, bronze medalist(s)	Sada Jacobson	United States
4	Cătălina Gheorghițoaia	Romania
5	Yelena Nechayeva	Russia
6	Léonore Perrus	France
7	Yelena Jemayeva	Azerbaijan
8	Zhang Ying	China
9	Anne-Lise Touya	France
10	Gioia Marzocca	Italy
11	Aleksandra Socha	Poland
12	Emily Jacobson	United States
13	Cécile Argiolas	France
14	Ana Faez	Cuba
15	Madoka Hisagae	Japan
16	Louise Bond-Williams	Great Britain
17	Susanne König	Germany
18	Orsolya Nagy	Hungary
19	Lee Sin-Mi	South Korea
20	Alejandra Benítez	Venezuela
21	Dar'ia Nedashkivska	Ukraine
22	Élora Pattaro	Brazil
23	Chow Tsz Ki	Hong Kong
24	Nafi Toure	Senegal
