= Ester Schreiber =

Swedish fencer (born 1997)

Personal information
- Born: 1997 (age 28–29)

Fencing career
- Sport: Fencing
- Country: Sweden
- Weapon: Foil
- Hand: Right
- FIE ranking: current ranking

Ester Schreiber (born 1997) is a Swedish foil fencer, who won the bronze medal in the 2013–14 Fencing World Cup. In 2014 and 2015, Schreiber was a Swedish Senior Fencing National Champion.

== Biography ==
Schreiber is from Gothenburg, Sweden. She attended high school at the Sigrid Rudebecks Gymnasium. Schreiber is enrolled at Barnard College (2020) and fences on the Columbia Lions fencing team of Columbia University. In the 2019 season, Schreiber helped her team achieve an undefeated record and win the woman's Ivy League Fencing Championships.
