= Fencers Club =

- Formation: 1883; 143 years ago
- Legal status: 501(c)(3) not-for-profit fencing organization
- Location: 20 West 33rd Street, Midtown Manhattan, New York City, U.S.
- Website: fencersclub.org

The Fencers Club in Midtown Manhattan, New York City, is the oldest fencing club in the Western Hemisphere. It is a member of the Metropolitan Division of the U.S. Fencing Association. Established in 1883, it has evolved into a 501(c)(3) not-for-profit fencing organization dedicated to fencing and community service. It has produced a number of national champions and Olympians.

The Fencers Club includes 22 full-length metal grounded training strips with electronic scoring equipment, as well as an in-house pro shop and armory.

== History ==
The Fencers Club was founded in 1883 by Charles de Kay and other New Yorkers. One had to be in the Social Register to be a member. Its first fencing master was Captain Hippolyte Nicolas, a French officer who had fought in the Franco-Prussian War of 1870, who was partial to the Italian school of fencing.

In 1892 it had about 200 members. In 1902 annual dues at the club were $30 ($1,120 in current dollar terms). In 1914, one third of its members were women. Rene Pinchart, a Belgian sergeant major in World War I, was fencing master at the club from 1927 to 1955. French-American Michel Alaux was fencing master of the club from 1956 until 1974.

It is the birthplace, in 1991, and home of the Peter Westbrook Foundation. In 2012, the Fencers Club became only the ninth organization to be recognized by the United States Olympic Committee (USOC) as a Community Olympic Development Program (CODP), for its innovative and world-class programs that embody the Olympic ideals.

In 2020, the Fencers Club fired a fencing coach after he made racist remarks.

== Notable members ==
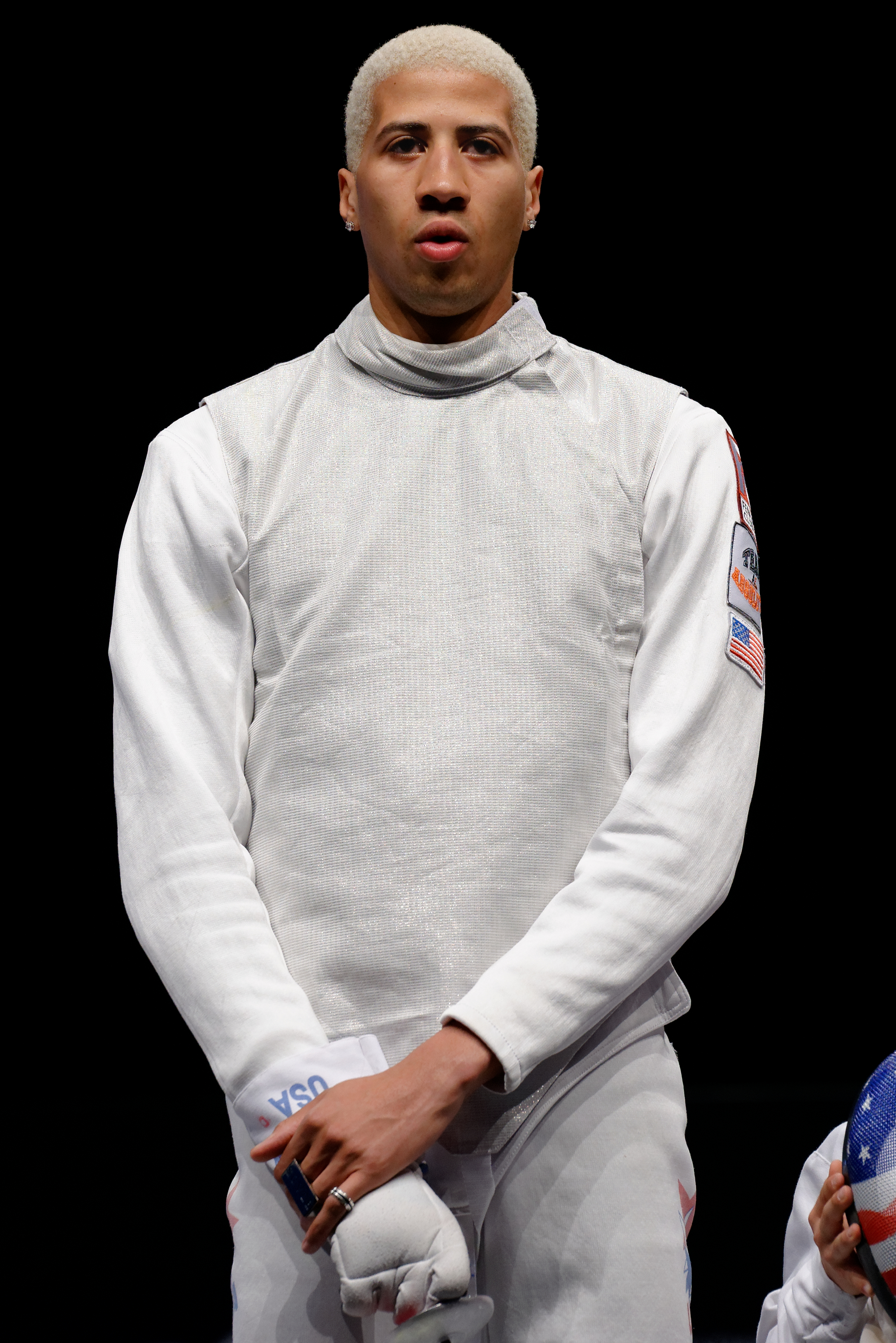
Miles Chamley-Watson

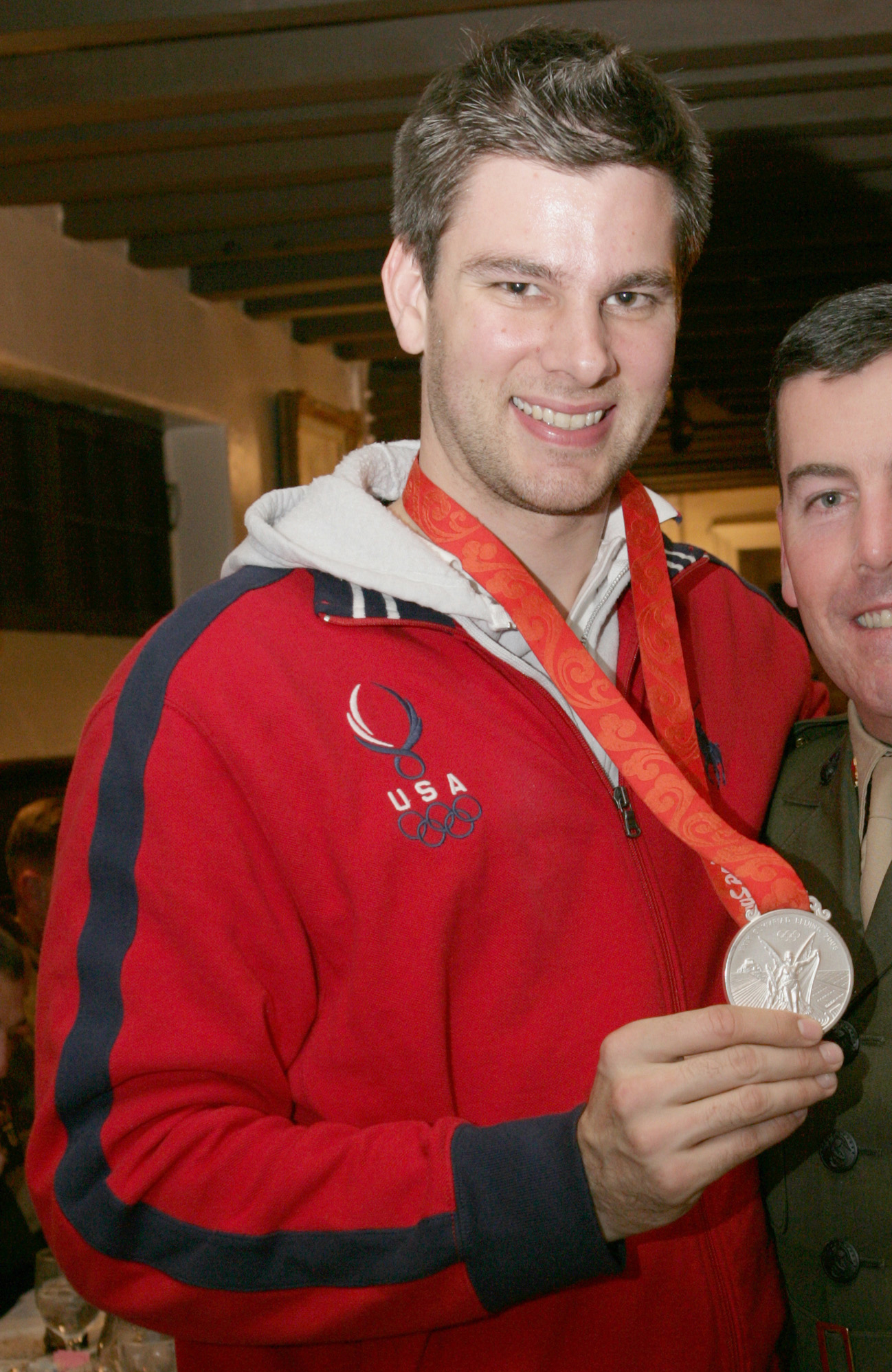
Tim Morehouse

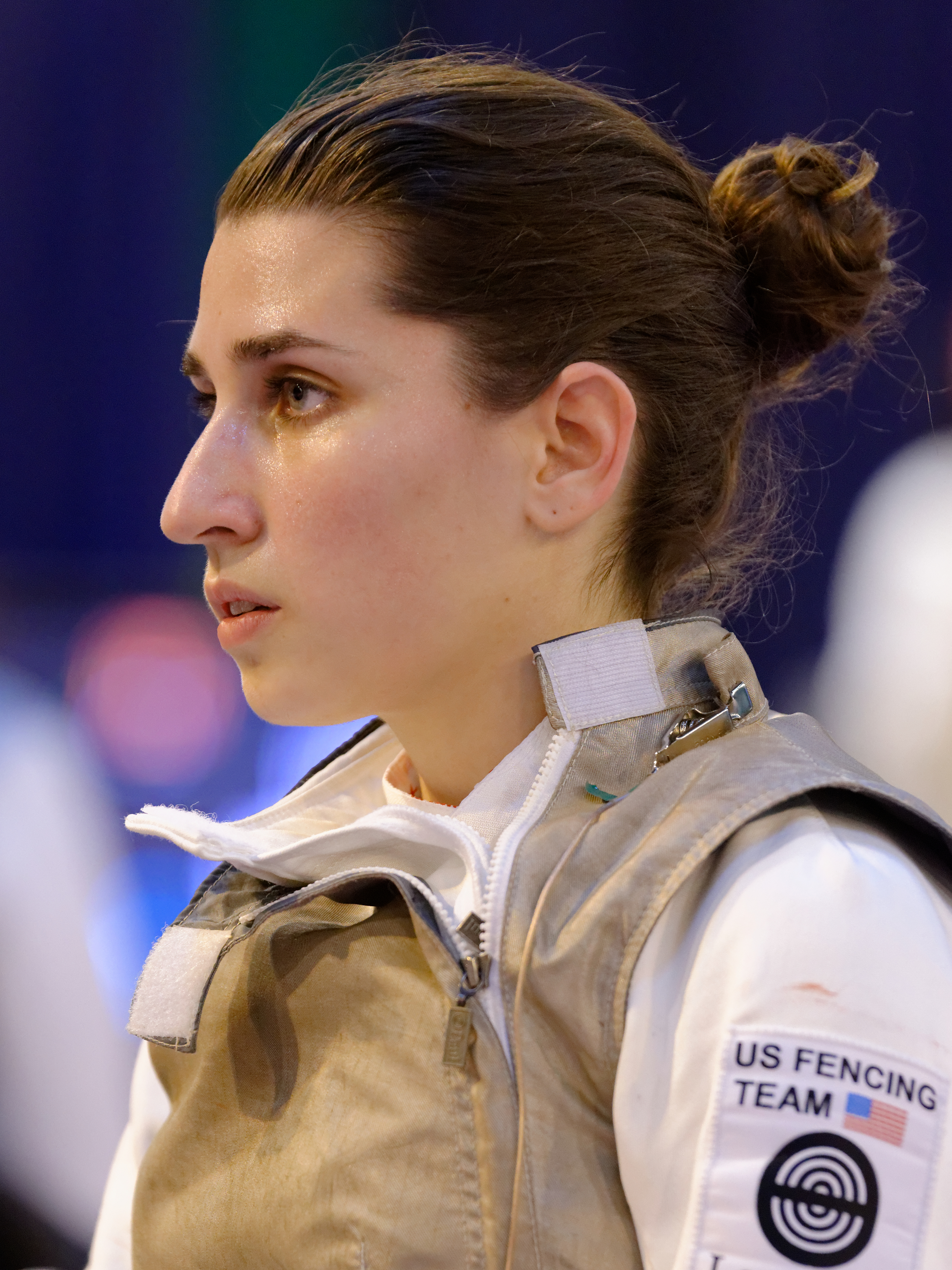
Nicole Ross

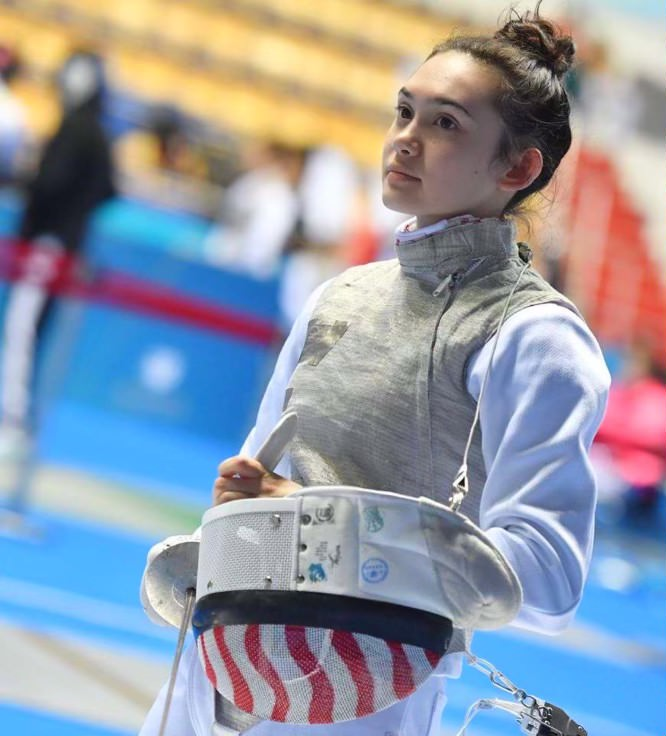
Maia Weintraub

- Albert Axelrod (1921–2004), 5x Olympian, Olympic bronze medalist
- Norman C. Armitage (1907, as Norman Cudworth Cohn–1972), 6x Olympian, Olympic bronze medalist
- Robert Blum (1928–2022), 2x Olympian
- Daniel Bukantz (1917–2008), 4x Olympian
- Miles Chamley-Watson (born 1989), 2x Olympian, bronze medalist
- Abe Cohen (1924–2016), Olympian
- Herb Cohen (born 1940), 2x Olympian
- Emily Cross (born 1986), Olympian, silver medalist
- Eugene Glazer (born 1939), Olympian
- Joel Glucksman (born 1949), Olympian
- Harold Goldsmith (1930–2004), 3x Olympian
- Emily Jacobson (born 1985), Olympian
- Dan Kellner (born 1976), Olympian
- Byron Krieger (1920–2015), 2x Olympian
- Ivan Lee (born 1981), Olympian; banned for life by SafeSport
- Nate Lubell (1916–2006), 3x Olympian
- James Carroll Beckwith, president of the Fencers Club
- James Margolis (born 1936), Olympian
- James Melcher (1939–2023), Olympian
- Tim Morehouse (born 1978), 3x Olympian, silver medalist
- Nickolas Muray (born Miklós Mandl; 1892–1965), Hungarian-born 2x Olympian
- Nzingha Prescod (born 1992), 2x Olympian
- Nicole Ross (born 1989), 2x Olympian
- Keeth Smart (born 1978), 3x Olympian, Olympic silver medalist
- James Strauch (1921–1998), Olympian
- Albert Strauss (1876-1963), Olympian
- Jonathan Tiomkin (born 1979), Olympian
- Maia Weintraub (born 2002), Olympian, Olympic gold medalist
- Peter Westbrook (1952–2024), 5x Olympian, Olympic bronze medalist

== See also ==
- United States Fencing Association
