= Robert Blum (disambiguation) =

Robert Blum (1807–1848) was a German poet and revolutionist.

Robert Blum may also refer to:

- Robert Blum (fencer) (1928–2022), American fencer
- Robert Frederick Blum (1857–1903), American artist
- Bob Blum (1920–2012), American broadcaster
