= Noam Mills =

Israeli fencer

Personal information
- Nationality: Israeli
- Born: נעם מילס; 27 May 1986 (age 40) Hod Hasharon, Israel
- Home town: Kfar Saba, Israel
- Height: 1.71 m (5 ft 7 in)
- Weight: 70 kg (154 lb)

Sport
- Country: Israel
- Sport: Fencing
- Event: Épée
- College team: Harvard University
- Club: Hapoel Kfar Saba (ISR)
- Coached by: Ohad Balva

Achievements and titles
- National finals: Three-time junior Israeli champion; four-time senior Israeli champion
- Highest world ranking: No. 1 ranked female junior épée fencer (2006)
Medal record
Women's fencing
Representing Israel
Universiade
Silver medal – second place	2007 Bangkok	Individual épée
European Fencing Championships
Bronze medal – third place	2010 Leipzig	Individual épée

Noam Mills (Hebrew: נעם מילס; born 27 May 1986) is an Israeli fencer, who competed in the individual women's épée event for Israel at the 2008 Summer Olympics in Beijing. She is a three-time junior Israeli champion in épée, and a four-time senior Israeli champion.

In 2006, she was the No. 1 ranked female junior épée fencer in the world, and won the épée title at the Junior World Fencing Championships. Mills won the silver medal in épée representing Israel at the 2007 Summer Universiade. Competing for the Harvard's Women's Fencing Team, she came in second in the NCAA Championships three times, in 2008–11. She also won the bronze medal at the 2010 European Fencing Championships in women's épée.

== Early life ==
Mills was born in Hod Hasharon, and grew up in Kfar Saba, Israel, and is Jewish. She attended Mosenzon High School in Kfar Saba.

== Fencing career ==
Mills began practicing fencing at the age of 11, and became a member of Hapoel Kfar Saba, a local fencing club in Israel. During her career, she won three junior national championship titles in épée. She won the Israel senior women's fencing épée championship four times, in 2005–08. Her coach in Israel was Ohad Balva. Mills commented on fencing: "Being strong is not enough. Fencing is like playing chess while running a 100 metre race."

In 2006, she made her international debut by winning the épée title at the Junior World Fencing Championships. That year, Mills was the No. 1 ranked female junior épée fencer in the world.

Mills won a silver medal in épée representing Israel at the 2007 Summer Universiade in Bangkok, Thailand, losing out to Ukraine's Yana Shemyakina. Mills came in 7th in women's épée at the 2008 European Fencing Championships in Kyiv, Ukraine.

Mills qualified for the 2008 Summer Olympics in Beijing, after finishing 7th at the 2007 European Fencing Championships in Prague, Czech Republic. She became the first female Israeli fencer to compete in the épée event at an Olympic level. Although she fell short of the qualifying criteria by the Olympic Committee of Israel, she was allocated one of the three spots reserved for promising youngsters. Mills and Emily Cross became the first Harvard University female fencers. They were the 14th and 15th in Ivy League history, to qualify for the Olympics.

Mills competed for Israel at the 2008 Olympics in Women's épée at the age of 22. She faced three-time Olympic medalist Laura Flessel-Colovic of France in the First Round of the competition. Mills suffered an anticipated defeat with a score of 8–15, failing to advance into the next round.

After the Olympics, Mills pursued a bachelor's degree in economics, with a minor in neurobiology, at Harvard University. She competed as the member of Harvard's Women's Fencing Team, and as a freshman in 2008-09 came in second at the NCAA Fencing Championships in women's épée to Courtney Hurley. She was named a First-Team All-American, and All-Ivy League. As a sophomore in 2009–10, she was team captain and again came in second at the NCAA Fencing Championships. She was again named a First-Team All-American, and All-Ivy League. As a junior in 2010–11, she again came in second at the NCAA Fencing Championships, and was again an All-American. In 2011, she received the Ivy League NCAA Elite 89 Award, established by the NCAA to recognize the student-athlete with the highest cumulative grade-point average participating at the finals for each of the NCAA's 89 championships, with a 3.86 GPA.

In 2009, she took 7th at the 2009 European Fencing Championships in women's épée in Plovdiv, Bulgaria. Mills competed at the 2010 European Fencing Championships in Leipzig, Germany, where she won the bronze medal in individual épée. She lost 15–14 in the Round of 32 at the 2011 World Fencing Championships to eventual silver medalist, Sun Yujie of China.

== See also ==
- List of select Jewish fencers
