= Malte Persson =

Swedish author (born 1976)

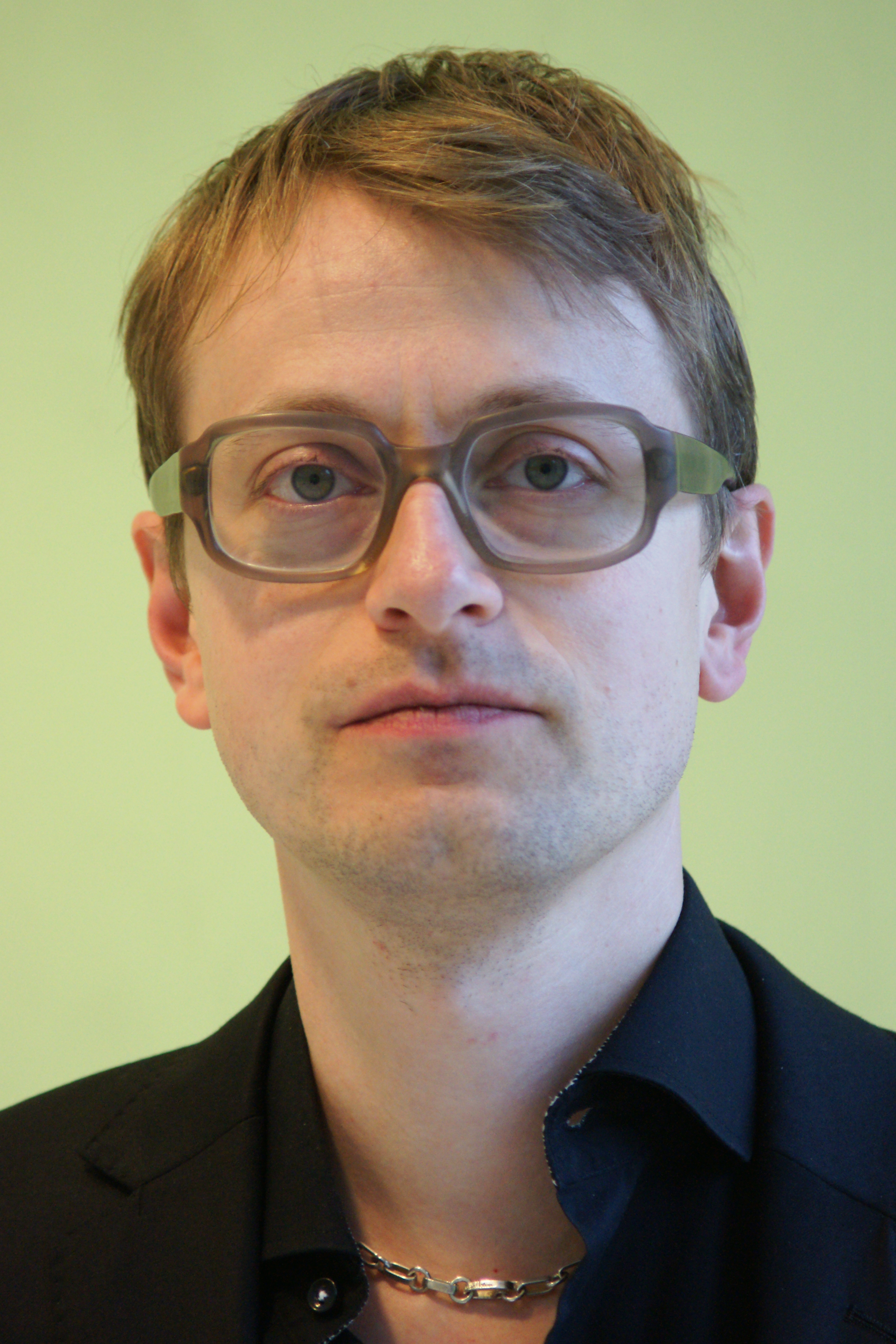
Malte Persson in 2018

Malte Persson (born 1976) is a Swedish author of novels and poetry and translator.

== Biography ==
Persson grew up in Gothenburg and attended Sigrid Rudebecks gymnasium.

His first book Livet på den här planeten (Life on this planet), a novel, was published in 2002. His subsequent two books are collections of poetry, Apolloprojektet (The Apollo project; 2004) and Dikter (Poems; 2007). Persson has been said to belong to modernist group of LANGUAGE-poetry forming around the Swedish literary magazine OEI, but has also challenged this view, being a cultivator of tradition and traditionally formal verse. In 2008 Edelcrantz förbindelser (Edelcrantz's relations) was published, an historical novel set in the 18th and 19th centuries and focusing on the life of Abraham Niclas Edelcrantz. Underjorden (The underground), a sequence of sonnets on the Stockholm Metro, was published in 2011.

Persson is also a translator, among others of Francis Ponge, Thomas Kling and Harry Mathews.

As a critic he writes for the daily newspaper Expressen. On his weblog Errata (2004–2010), Persson commented on the literary life in Sweden. Errata used to be most well-known not for Persson's articles, but for the debates being initiated and conducted among its readers in the commentary field.

== Bibliography ==
- Livet på den här planeten, 2002
- Apolloprojektet, 2004
- Dikter, 2007
- Edelcrantz förbindelser, 2008
- Underjorden, 2011

== English translations ==
- Fantasy. Translated by Saskia Vogel. Readux Books, 2013
