= Ivy League Fencing Championships =

American college fencing tournament

Ivy League Fencing
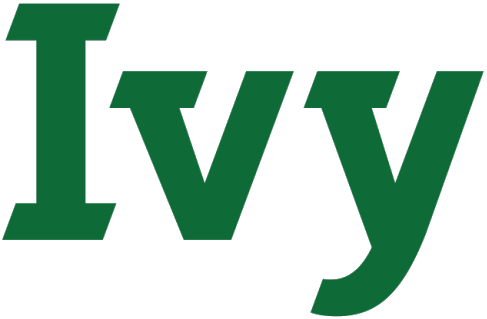
- Conference: Ivy League
- Sport: College fencing
- Founded: 1956; 70 years ago
- Organizing body: Ivy League
- Country: United States
- Website: ivyleague.com/mfence ivyleague.com/wfence

The Ivy League Fencing Championships is an annual tournament to determine the Ivy League standings in men's and women's fencing. Unlike at the NCAA Fencing Championships, the men's and women's events are contested separately.

== History ==
Then men's Ivy League Round-Robin has existed since 1956; the women's since 1982. Currently, five teams compete in the men's tournament, as Brown, Cornell and Dartmouth do not sponsor NCAA men's fencing teams. Brown and Cornell had previously participated, but their men's NCAA team were cut after the 2020 and 1993 seasons, respectively. The women's competition features seven teams, with every Ivy League school with the exception of Dartmouth sponsoring a team.

== Men's Results ==
Year	Champion	2nd Place	3rd Place	4th Place	5th Place	6th Place
2025	Princeton	Columbia	Penn	Harvard	Yale	
2024	Columbia / Harvard / Princeton			Penn	Yale	
2023	Harvard	Columbia	Princeton	Penn	Yale	
2022	Columbia	Harvard	Penn	Princeton	Yale	
2021	Cancelled due to COVID-19					
2020	Harvard	Columbia	Princeton	Yale / Penn / Brown		
2019	Columbia	Harvard	Yale	Princeton	Penn	Brown
2018	Columbia / Harvard / Penn			Princeton	Yale	Brown
2017	Columbia / Penn / Princeton			Yale	Harvard	Brown
2016	Columbia / Penn / Princeton			Harvard	Yale	Brown
2015	Columbia / Harvard		Penn / Princeton		Brown	Yale
2014	Columbia / Harvard		Penn / Princeton		Brown	Yale
2013	Harvard	Columbia / Penn / Princeton			Yale	Brown
2012	Princeton	Harvard	Columbia / Penn		Brown / Yale	
2011	Harvard	Yale	Penn	Princeton	Brown	Columbia
2010	Princeton	Harvard / Penn		Brown / Yale		Columbia
2009	Penn	Columbia	Princeton	Brown / Harvard / Yale		
2008	Columbia	Penn	Harvard	Princeton	Yale	Brown
2007	Harvard / Columbia		Penn / Princeton		Yale	Brown
2006	Harvard	Columbia	Princeton	Penn	Brown	Yale
2005	Columbia / Harvard		Penn / Princeton		Yale	
2004	Columbia	Penn / Princeton / Harvard			Yale	
2003	Columbia / Penn		Harvard / Princeton		Yale	
2002	Columbia	Yale	Penn	Princeton	Harvard	
2001	Columbia / Penn / Princeton			Yale	Harvard	
2000	Princeton	Penn	Yale	Columbia	Harvard	
1999	Penn	Princeton	Columbia	Yale	Harvard	
1998	Columbia / Princeton		Penn / Yale		Harvard	
1997	Princeton	Yale	Columbia	Penn	Harvard	
1996	Columbia / Yale		Penn / Princeton		Harvard	
1995	Princeton	Yale / Columbia / Penn			Harvard	
1994	Princeton	Yale	Columbia	Penn	Harvard	
1993	Columbia	Yale	Penn	Princeton	Harvard	Cornell
1992	Columbia	Yale	Penn	Princeton	Harvard	Cornell
1991	Columbia	Penn / Princeton / Yale			Harvard	Cornell
1990	Columbia	Penn	Princeton	Yale	Cornell	Harvard
1989	Columbia	Yale	Penn	Princeton	Harvard	Cornell
1988	Columbia	Yale	Princeton	Penn	Harvard	Cornell
1987	Columbia	Yale	Penn	Princeton	Cornell	Harvard
1986	Columbia	Yale / Harvard / Penn			Cornell	Princeton
1985	Yale	Penn	Columbia	Princeton	Harvard	Cornell
1984	Columbia	Penn	Princeton	Harvard	Cornell	Yale
1983	Penn	Columbia	Princeton	Harvard	Cornell	Yale
1982	Penn	Columbia / Princeton / Yale			Harvard	Cornell
1981	Penn	Columbia	Princeton	Harvard	Yale	Cornell
1980	Penn / Princeton		Cornell / Yale		Columbia	Harvard
1979	Penn	Princeton	Columbia	Harvard	Yale	Cornell
1978	Penn	Princeton / Yale		Harvard / Columbia / Cornell		
1977	Cornell / Harvard / Penn			Yale	Princeton	Columbia
1976	Penn	Columbia	Princeton	Cornell	Yale	Harvard
1975	Cornell / Princeton		Columbia / Penn		Harvard	Yale
1974	Columbia / Cornell / Harvard			Penn / Princeton / Yale		
1973	Penn	Columbia / Cornell / Princeton			Yale	Harvard
1972	Columbia	Harvard / Penn / Yale			Princeton	Cornell
1971	Columbia	Penn	Princeton	Harvard	Yale	Cornell
1970	Columbia	Penn	Princeton	Cornell / Harvard / Yale		
1969	Penn / Princeton		Columbia	Harvard	Cornell	Yale
1968	Columbia	Penn	Princeton / Cornell		Yale	Harvard
1967	Columbia / Penn		Princeton / Cornell		Harvard	Yale
1966	Columbia / Penn / Princeton			Cornell	Harvard	Yale
1965	Columbia	Princeton	Penn	Cornell / Harvard		Yale
1964	Columbia	Princeton	Cornell	Harvard	Penn	Yale
1963	Columbia	Princeton	Cornell	Penn	Harvard	Yale
1962	Columbia	Princeton	Cornell	Penn	Harvard	Yale
1961	Columbia	Yale	Penn	Princeton	Cornell	Harvard
1960	Columbia / Princeton		Penn / Yale		Cornell	Harvard
1959	Princeton / Yale		Cornell	Columbia / Penn		Harvard
1958	Columbia	Cornell / Penn		Princeton / Yale		Harvard
1957	Columbia	Princeton / Penn		Yale	Cornell	
1956	Columbia	Princeton	Penn	Yale	Cornell	Harvard

== Women's Results ==
Year	Champion	2nd. place	3rd. place	4th. place	5th. place	6th. place	7th. place
2025	Harvard	Columbia	Princeton	Cornell / Penn		Brown / Yale	
2024	Columbia / Penn / Princeton			Yale	Harvard	Cornell	Brown
2023	Princeton	Columbia	Penn	Harvard	Brown	Cornell	Yale
2022	Princeton	Columbia / Harvard		Penn / Yale		Cornell	Brown
2021	Cancelled due to COVID-19						
2020	Columbia	Penn / Princeton		Harvard	Yale / Cornell		Brown
2019	Columbia	Princeton	Yale / Harvard / Penn			Cornell	Brown
2018	Columbia	Princeton	Harvard	Penn	Yale	Cornell	Brown
2017	Princeton	Columbia	Penn	Harvard	Cornell	Yale	Brown
2016	Columbia / Harvard / Princeton			Penn	Cornell	Yale	Brown
2015	Columbia	Princeton / Penn / Harvard			Cornell	Brown	Yale
2014	Princeton	Harvard	Columbia	Penn	Cornell	Brown	Yale
2013	Princeton	Columbia	Harvard	Brown	Cornell	Penn	Yale
2012	Princeton	Columbia	Harvard	Penn	Yale	Brown	Cornell
2011	Princeton	Columbia	Harvard	Penn	Cornell	Brown	Yale
2010	Princeton	Columbia	Penn	Harvard	Yale	Cornell	Brown
2009	Harvard	Columbia	Princeton	Penn / Yale		Cornell	Brown
2008	Columbia	Penn	Brown	Harvard / Princeton		Cornell / Yale	
2007	Columbia	Harvard	Penn	Cornell / Princeton		Brown / Yale	
2006	Harvard	Columbia	Penn	Princeton / Yale		Brown / Cornell	
2005	Harvard	Columbia	Penn / Princeton		Yale	Cornell	
2004	Penn	Columbia	Princeton	Harvard	Yale	Cornell	
2003	Columbia	Princeton	Harvard / Penn / Yale			Cornell	
2002	Yale	Columbia / Princeton		Penn	Harvard	Cornell	
2001	Princeton	Yale / Columbia / Penn			Harvard	Cornell	
2000	Princeton	Yale	Columbia	Penn	Harvard	Cornell	
1999	Columbia / Princeton / Yale			Harvard	Penn	Cornell	
1998	Yale	Columbia	Princeton	Penn	Harvard	Cornell	
1997	Yale	Harvard	Columbia	Penn	Princeton	Cornell	
1996	Yale	Princeton / Columbia		Harvard / Penn		Cornell	
1995	Penn	Yale	Harvard	Columbia	Princeton	Cornell	
1994	Penn	Harvard	Princeton	Yale	Columbia		
1993	Columbia	Princeton / Penn / Yale			Harvard	Cornell	
1992	Penn	Yale	Columbia	Cornell	Harvard	Princeton	
1991	Columbia	Yale	Penn	Princeton	Cornell	Harvard	
1990	Columbia	Penn	Yale	Harvard	Cornell	Princeton	
1989	Columbia	Penn	Harvard	Yale	Cornell	Princeton	
1988	Penn	Columbia	Harvard	Yale	Princeton	Cornell	
1987	Penn	Columbia	Yale	Harvard	Cornell		
1986	Penn	Yale	Columbia	Harvard	Cornell		
1985	Penn	Columbia	Yale	Cornell	Harvard		
1984	Penn	Yale	Columbia	Cornell	Harvard		
1983	Penn	Cornell	Yale	Barnard	Harvard		
1982	Yale	Penn	Cornell	Barnard	Harvard		

1.After the 1983 season, Columbia began accepting women. All future results are noted as Columbia, though students from Barnard were able to compete on the Columbia team. This is the only Division I NCAA consortium team.
