= Netishyn =

City in Khmelnytskyi Oblast, Ukraine

Netishyn Нетішин
- City
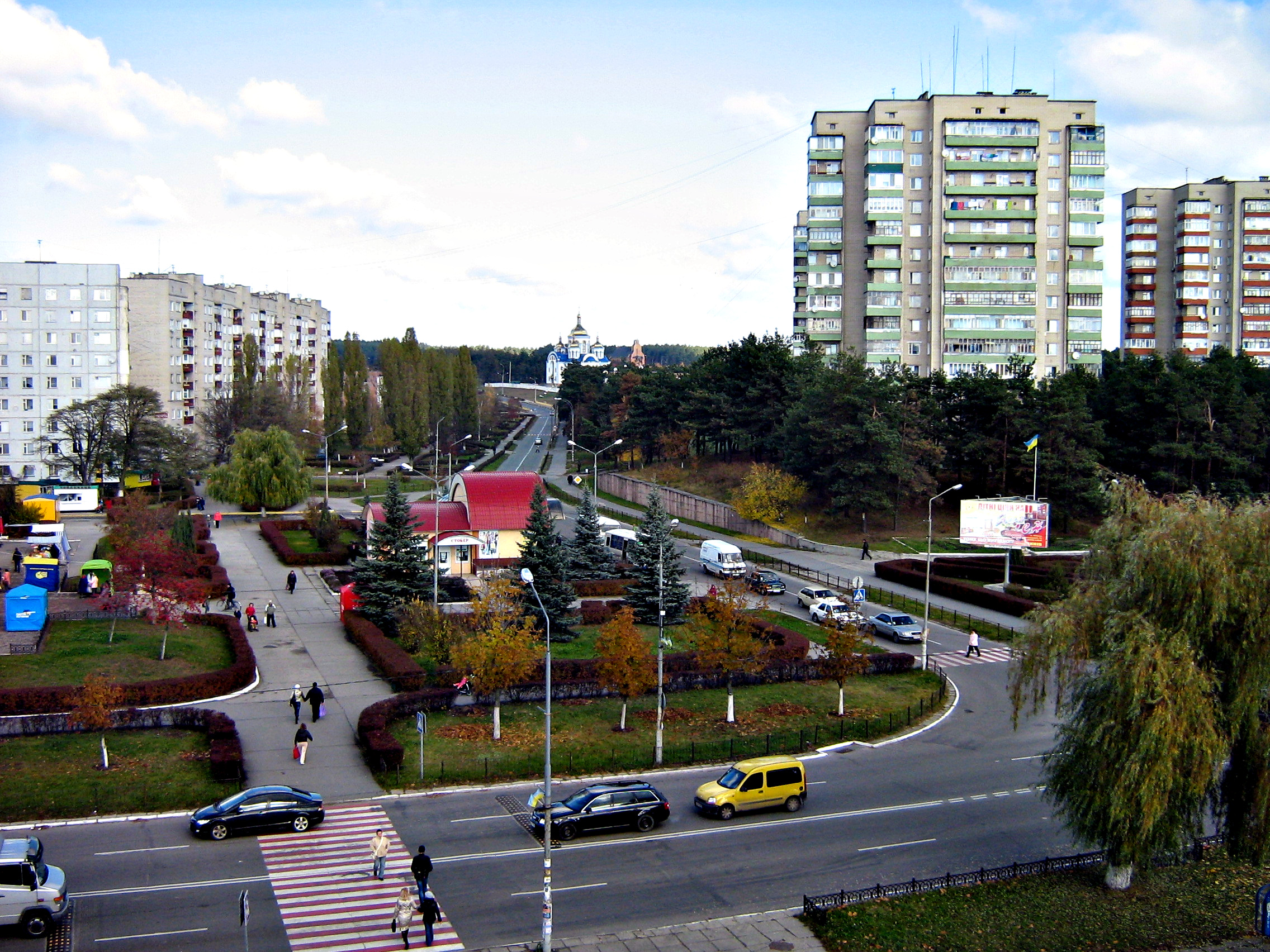
- Nezalezhnosti Avenue

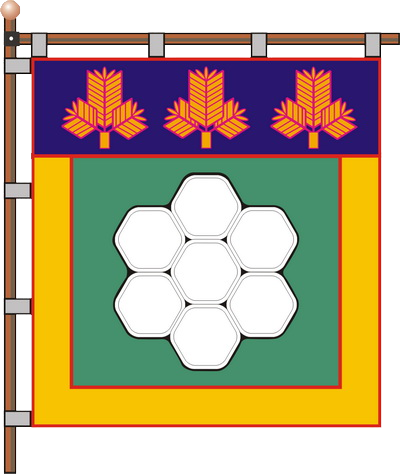
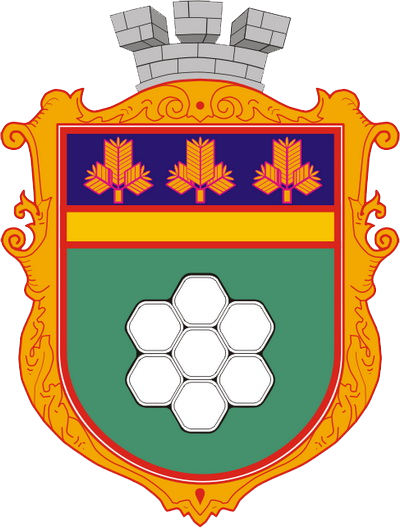
- Flag Coat of arms

- Location of Netishyn in Ukraine Netishyn (Ukraine)
- Coordinates: 50°21′0″N 26°38′0″E
- Country: Ukraine
- Oblast: Khmelnytskyi Oblast
- Raion: Shepetivka Raion
- Hromada: Netishyn urban hromada
- First mention date: 1542
- Status: 1984

Area
  - Total: 24.67 km^{2} (9.53 sq mi)

Population (2022)
  - Total: 36 492
- Time zone: UTC+2 (EET)
  - Summer (DST): UTC+3 (EEST)
- Postal code: 30100
- Area code: +380-3842
- Website: https://netishynrada.gov.ua/

Netishyn (Ukrainian: Нетішин [neˈt⁽ʲ⁾iʃɪn]; Polish: Niecieszyn) is a city in Shepetivka Raion of Khmelnytskyi Oblast (province), in the west of Ukraine. It is located on the Horyn River. Netishyn hosts the administration of Netishyn urban hromada, one of the hromadas of Ukraine. Population: 36,492 (2022 estimate).

Netishyn is the site of the Khmelnytskyi Nuclear Power Plant.

Until 18 July 2020, Netishyn was incorporated as a city of oblast significance and did not belong to the raion. In July 2020, as part of the administrative reform of Ukraine, which reduced the number of raions of Khmelnytskyi Oblast to three, the city of Netishyn was merged into Shepetivka Raion.

== History ==
Historical affiliations

Grand Duchy of Lithuania 1542–1569
Polish–Lithuanian Commonwealth 1569–1793
Russian Empire 1793–1917
Ukrainian People's Republic 1917-1919
Republic of Poland 1919–1920
Soviet Ukraine 1920–1922
Soviet Union 1922–1941
Nazi Germany 1941–1944 (occupation) Killing of the town Jewish Community in 1942 by the Nazis.
Soviet Union 1944–1991
Ukraine 1991–present

== Notable people ==
- Alina Komashchuk — champion fencer
- Dariya Nedashkovska — fencer
- Olha Zhovnir — champion fencer
- Halyna Pundyk — champion fencer
- Valeriy Fedorchuk — footballer

== Gallery ==
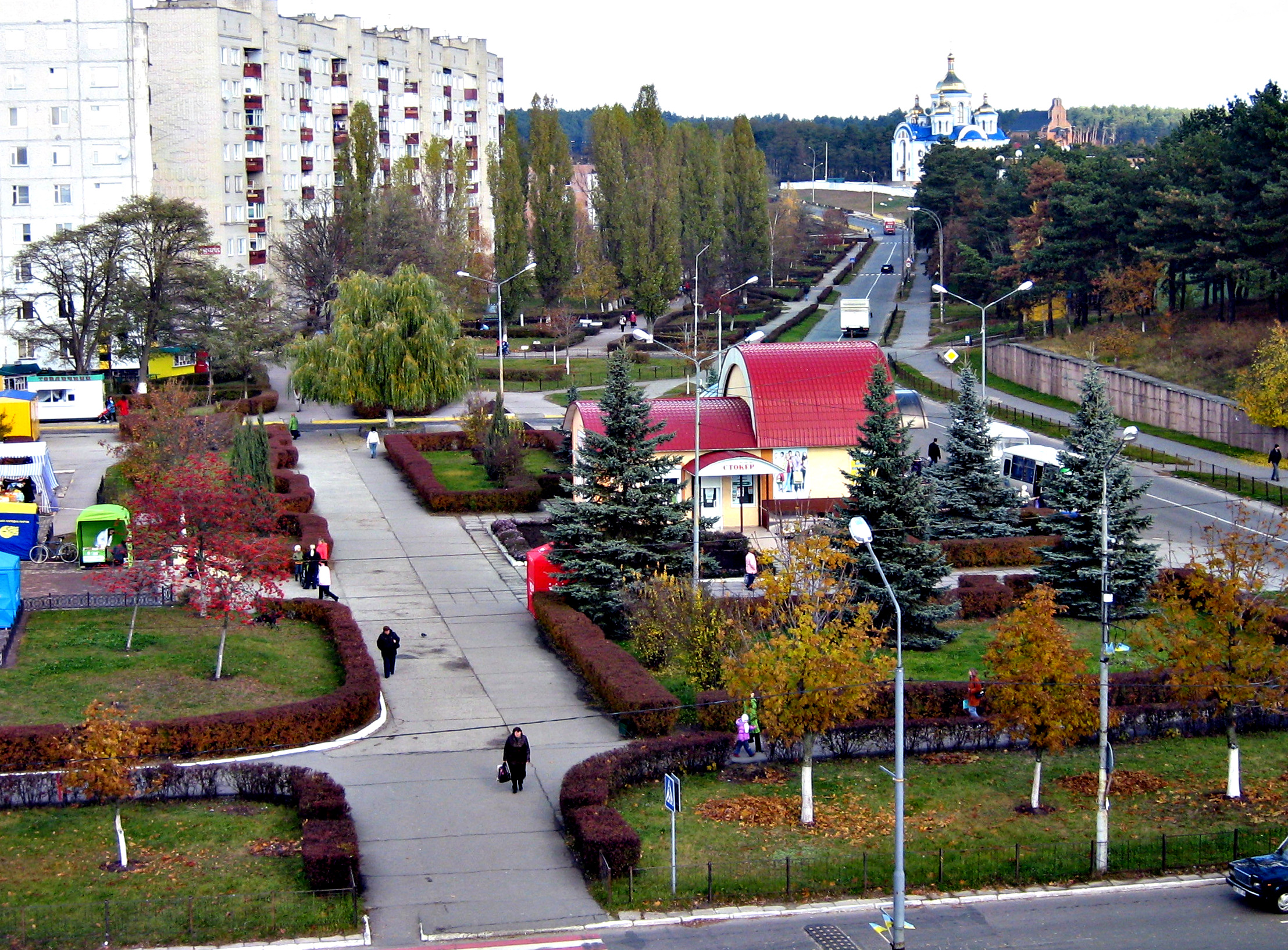
City center

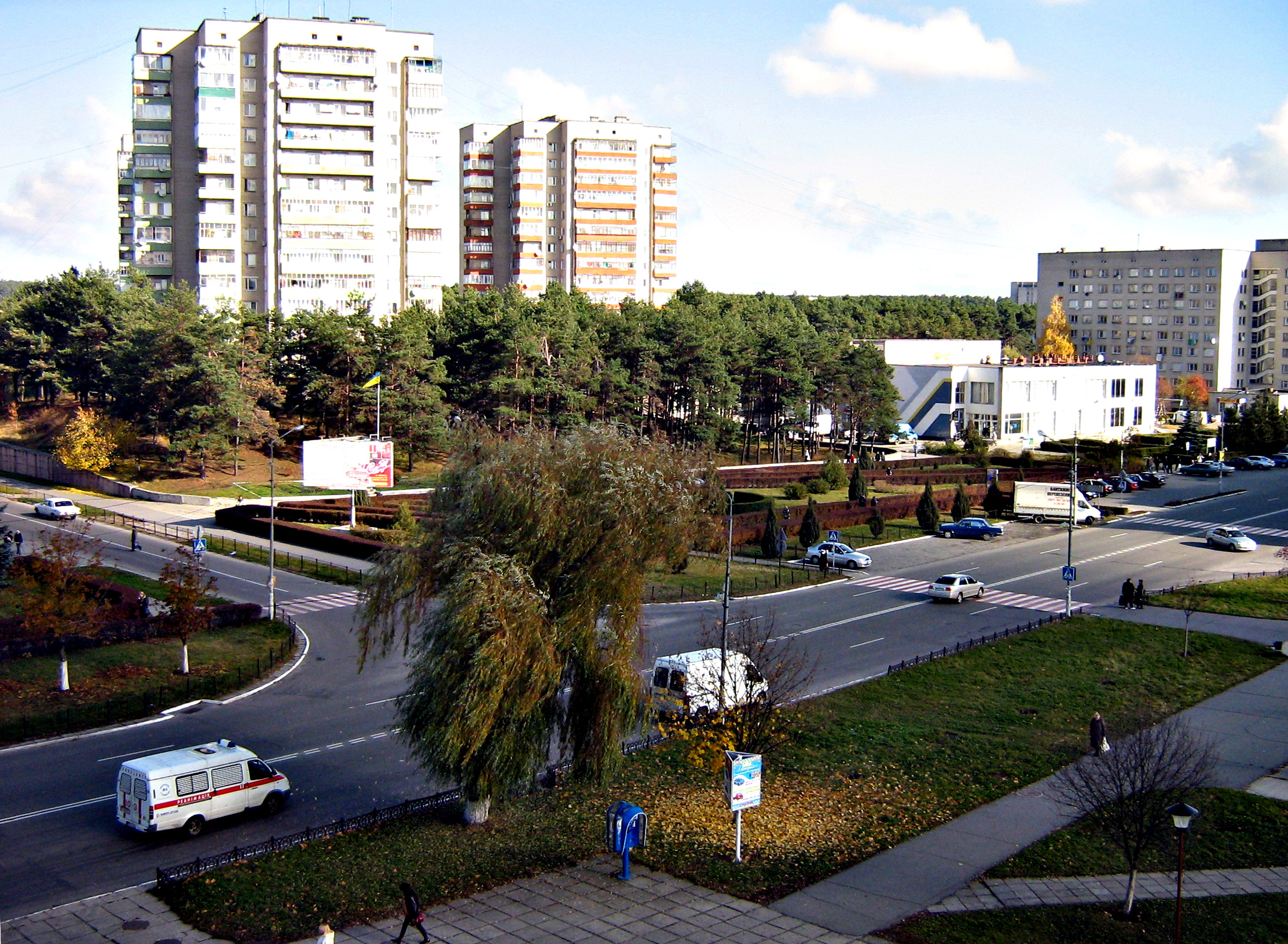
Nezalezhnosti Avenue

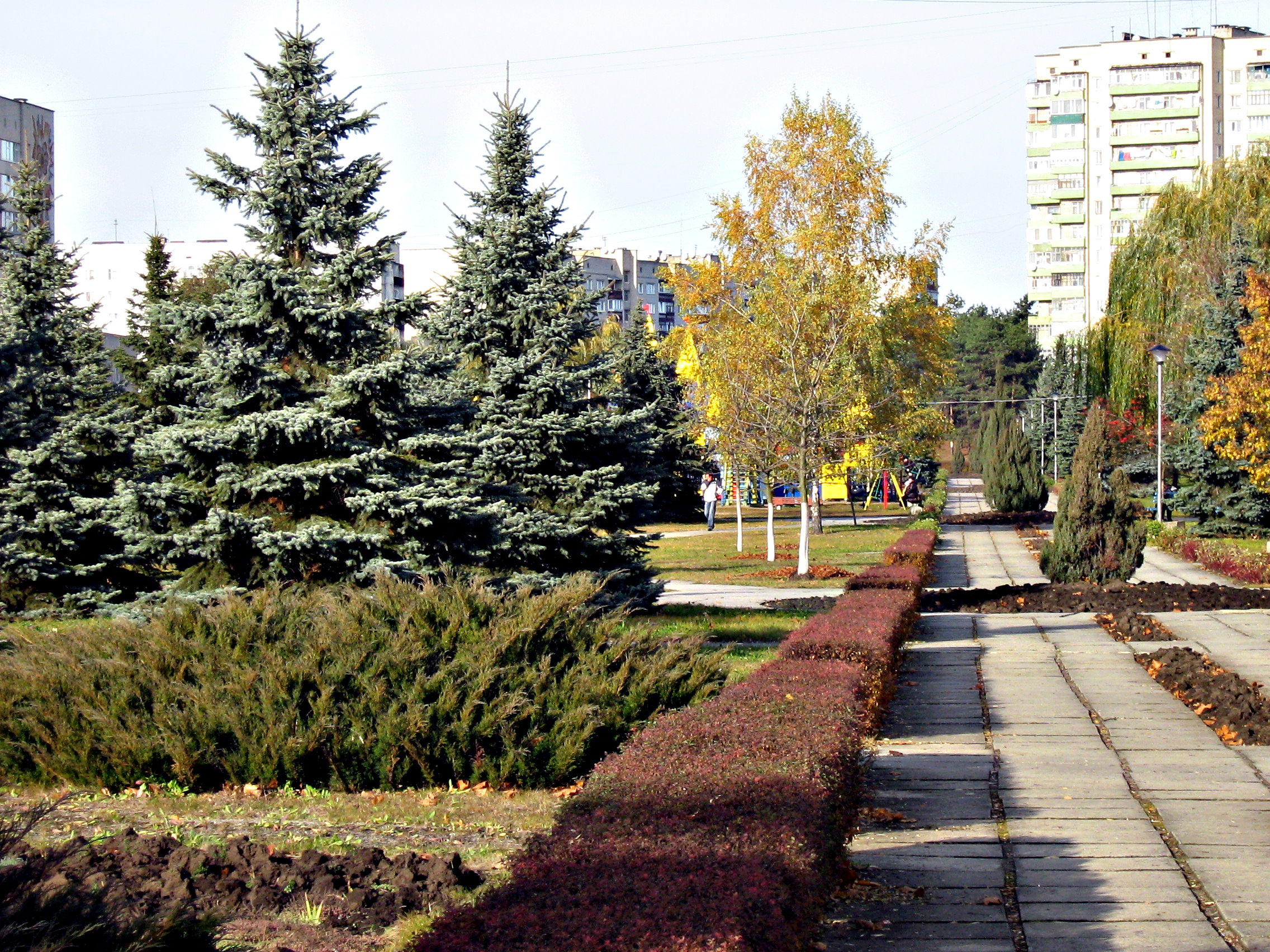
Kurchatova Avenue

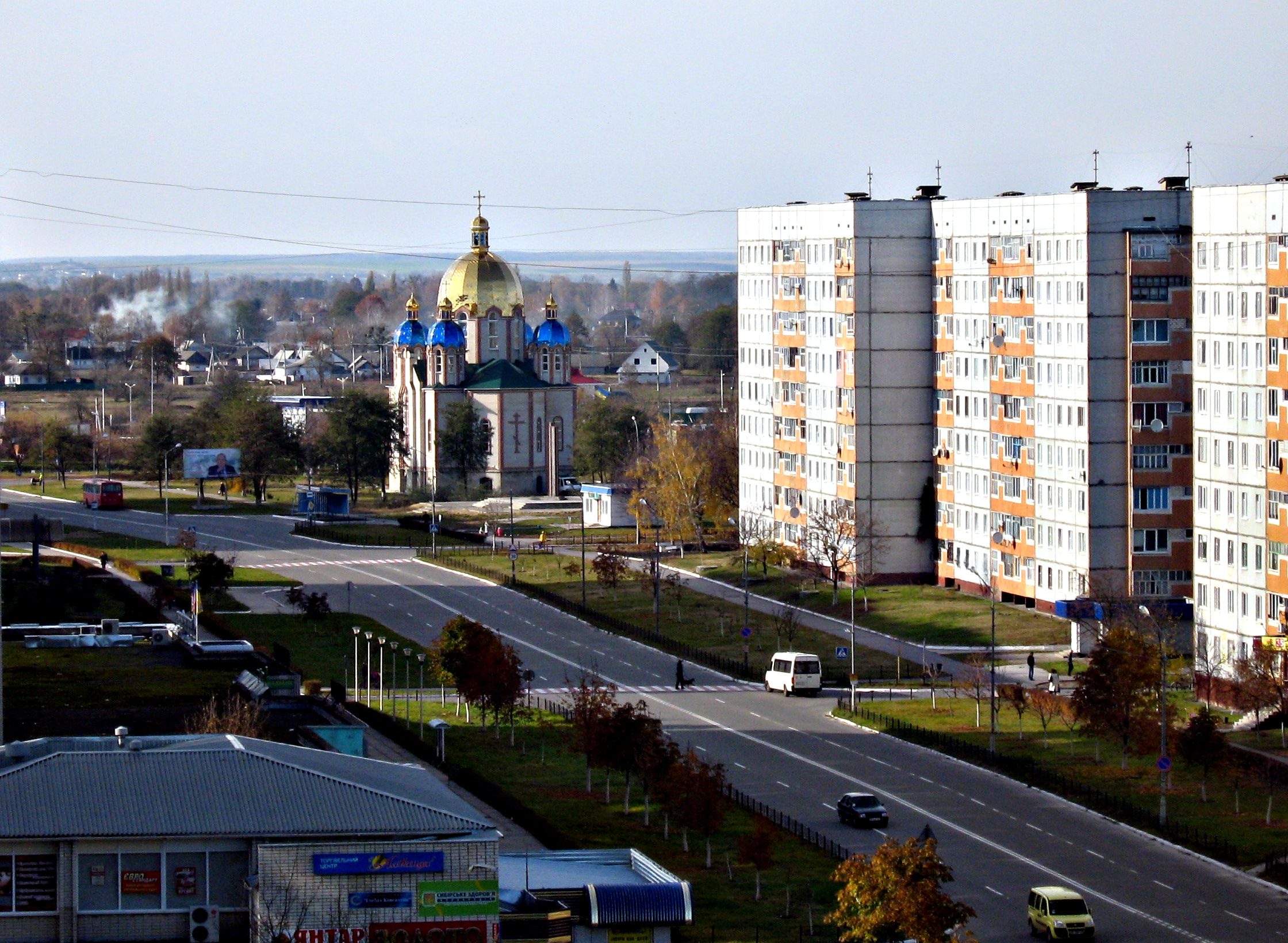
Nezalezhnosti Avenue

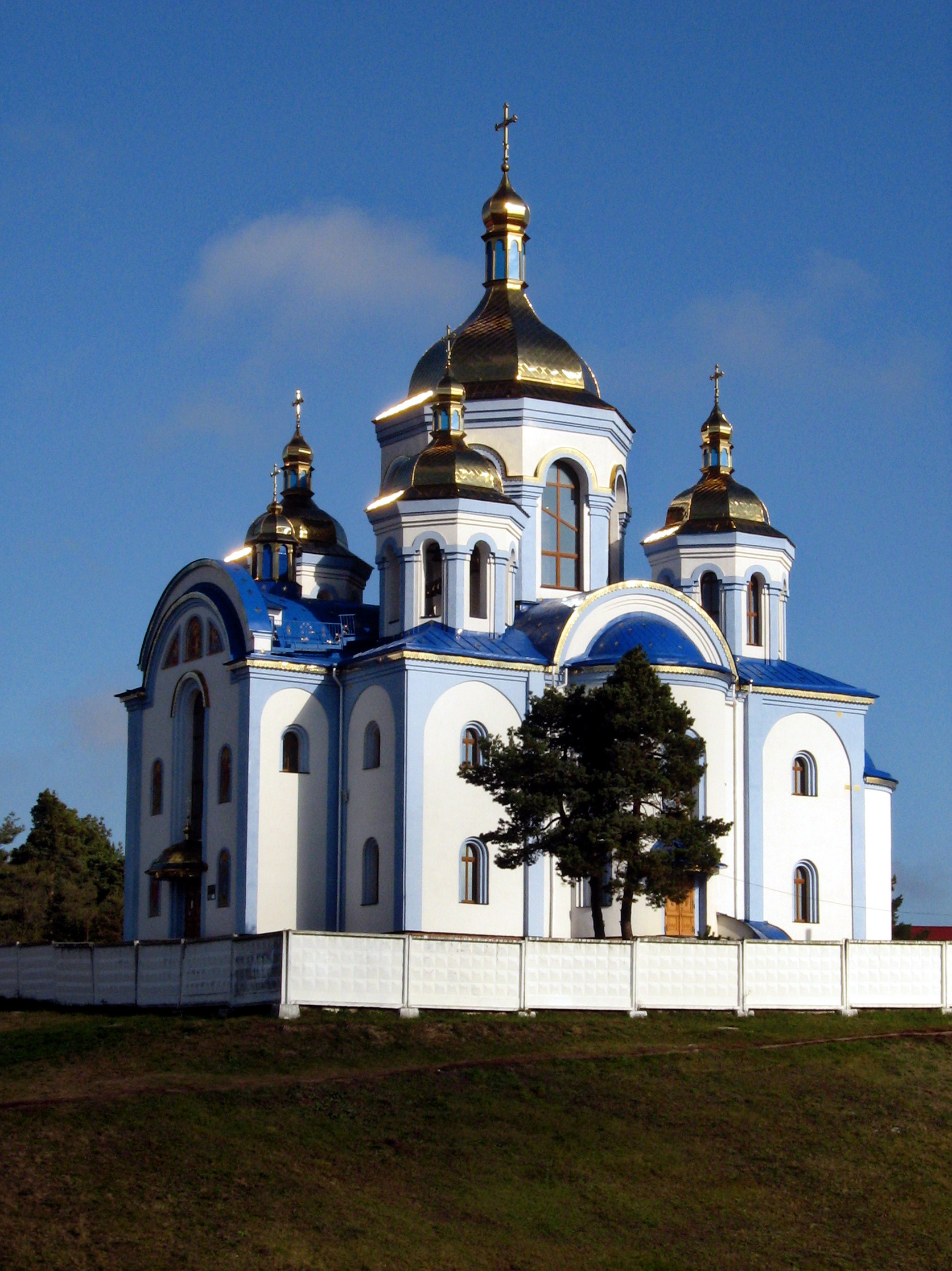
Neopalyma Kupyna Cathedral

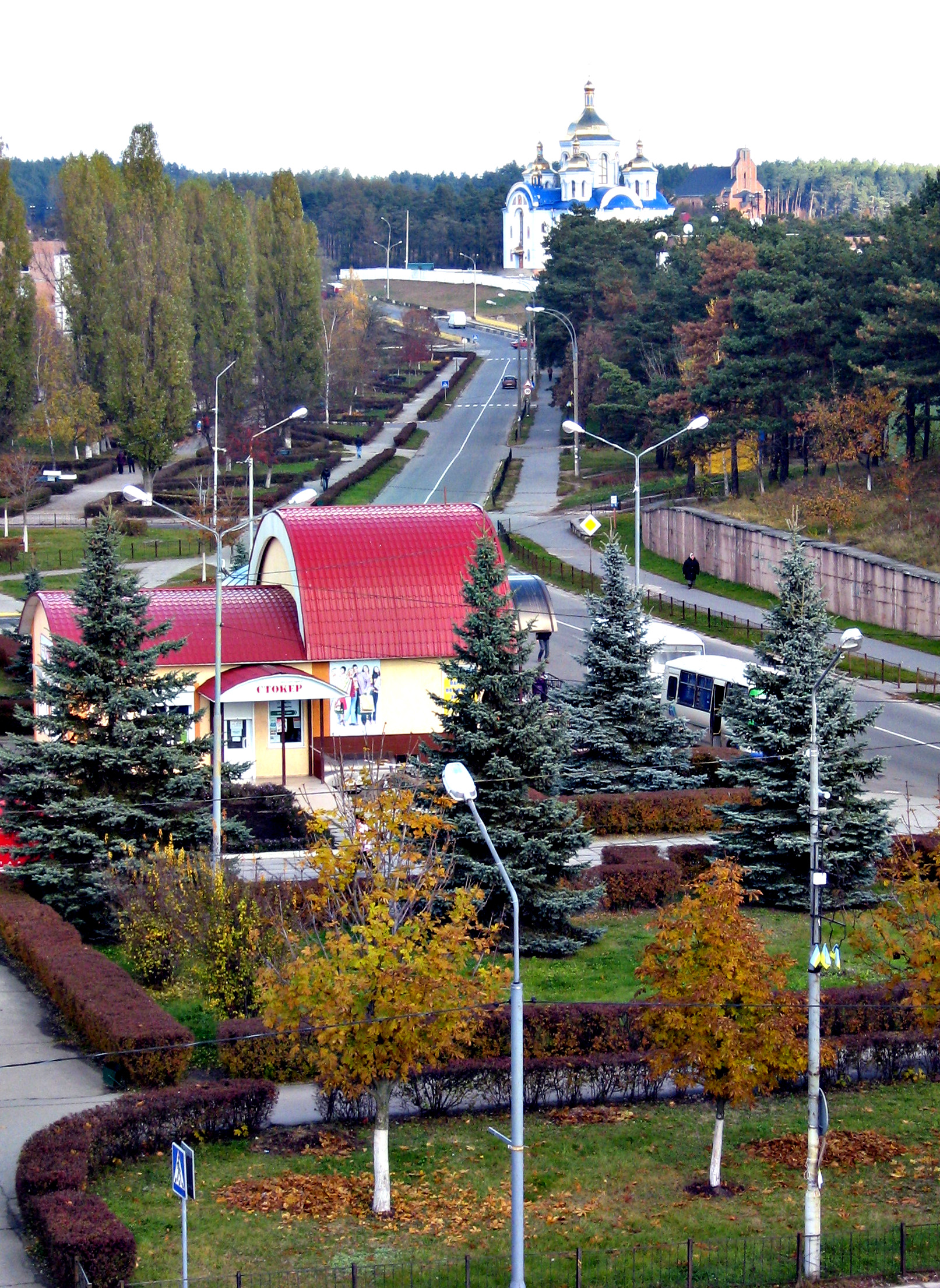
Budivelnykiv Street

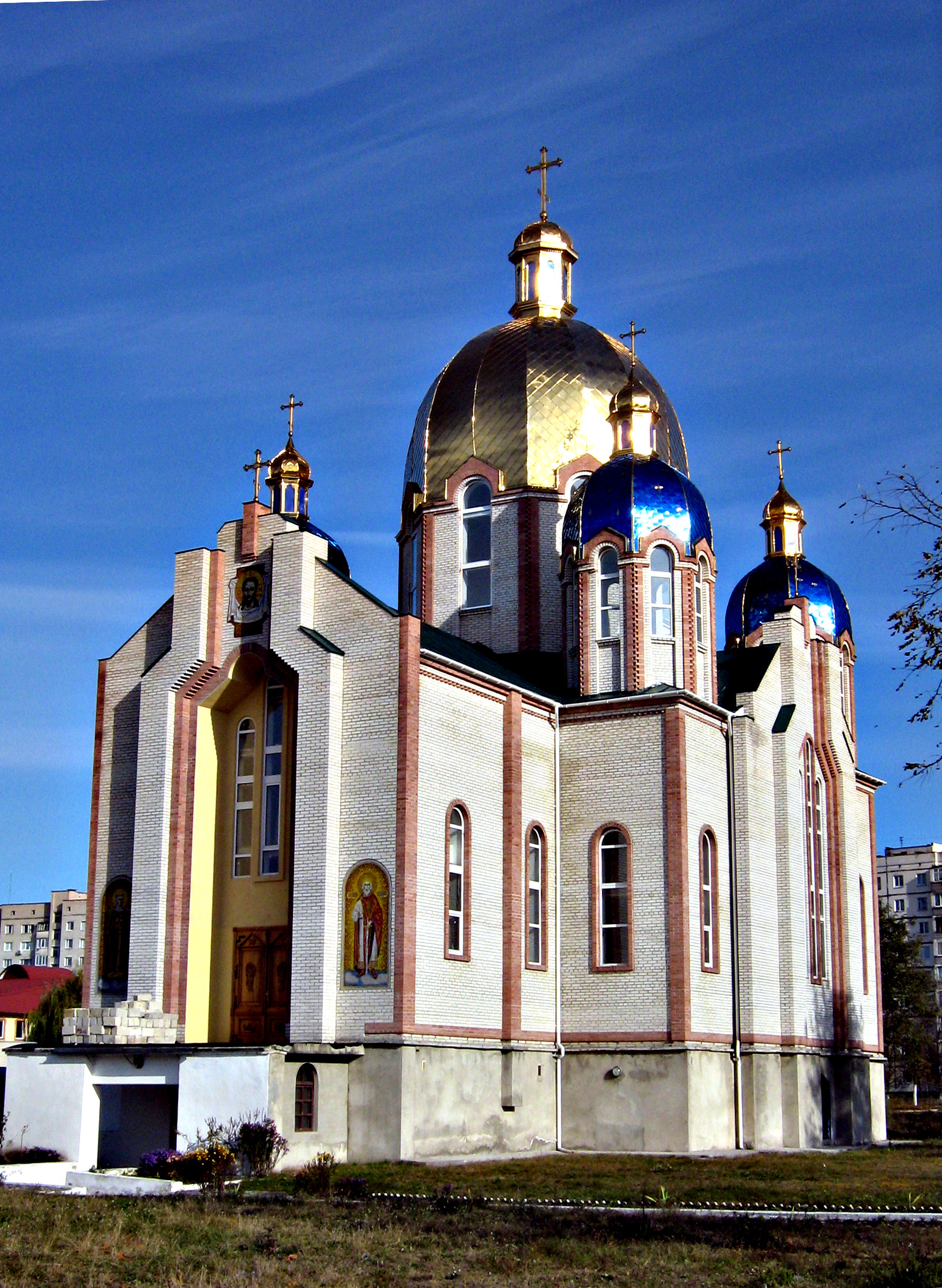
Church of Archangel Michael

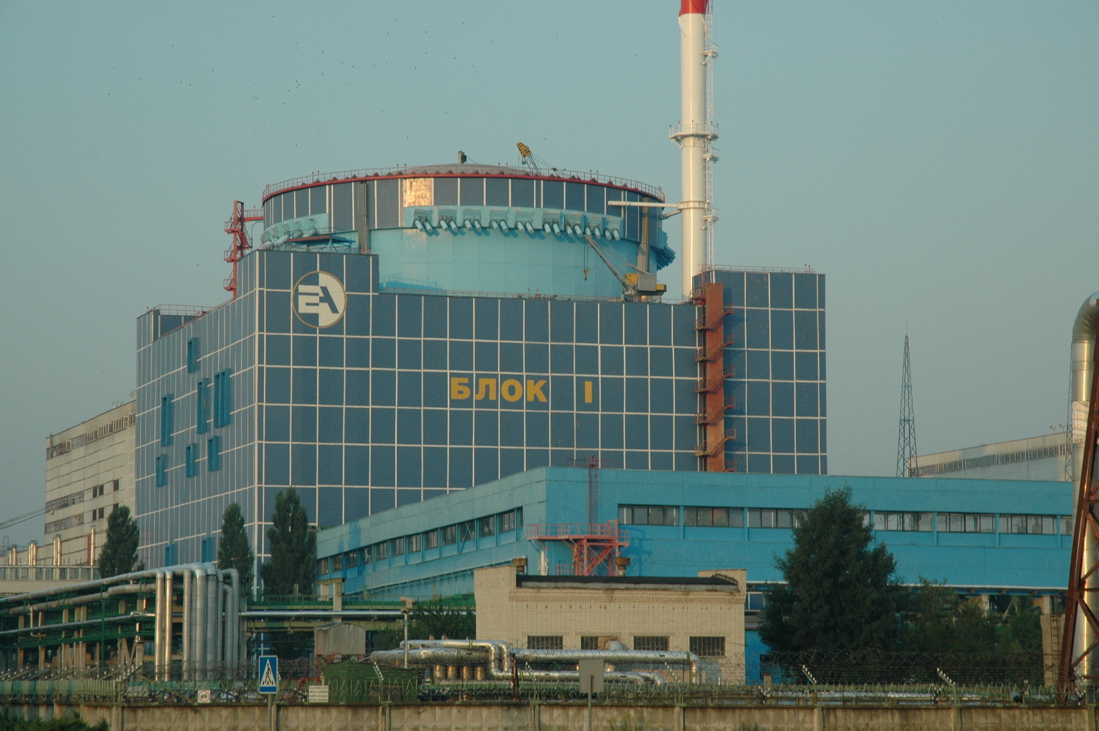
Block no. 1 of Khmelnytskyi Nuclear Power Plant
