= Louise Bond-Williams =

British sabre fencer

Personal information
- Born: 14 May 1982 (age 44) Chipping Campden, Gloucestershire, England
- Home town: Truro, Cornwall
- Height: 1.69 m (5 ft 7 in)
- Weight: 59 kg (130 lb)

Fencing career
- Sport: Fencing
- Weapon: Sabre
- Hand: right-handed
- National coach: Jon Salfield, Peter Frohlich
- Club: Truro Fencing Club
- Retired: 2012
- FIE ranking: current ranking

Louise Bond-Williams (born 14 May 1982) is a British former sabre fencer. She represented Great Britain at the 2004 and 2012 Summer Olympics.

== Career ==
Bond-Williams took up fencing at Chipping Campden School. She quickly showed promise, winning the West Midlands championships for her age class when she was twelve. She was then coached by David Kirby at Shakespeare's Swords, the fencing club at King Edward VI School, Stratford-upon-Avon.

In 1999, first year where women's sabre was allowed at top-level competitions, she earned a silver medal at the Cadet World Championships in Dijon and posted a last-16 finish at the Senior World Championships in Seoul. The following year she won a silver medal at Budapest and a gold medal at Havana in the Junior World Cup circuit. She went on to take a silver medal at the 2002 Junior World Championships in Antalya and reached the quarter-finals at the senior championships in Lisbon.

At a World Cup event in Spain Bond-Williams was noticed by Ohio State coach Vladimir Nazlymov who offered to train her in the United States and arranged for an athletic scholarship. She accepted the offer as the University of Birmingham, where she had been studying for a year, did not offer her the facilities to train properly at her level. She fenced for the Ohio State Buckeyes from 2002 to 2004, taking All-America honours each season. Ohio State would induct her into their Athletics Hall of Fame in 2012.

She made her Olympic début at the 2004 Summer Olympics, the first Games allowing women's sabre, after reaching the final in the European qualifying event. In the first round of the individual event she saw off Germany's Susanne Koenig, but lost afterwards to Russia's Yelena Nechayeva.

After the Games she resumed her history degree at Ohio State while serving as undergraduate assistant coach. She posted two quarter-finals finishes in the 2004–05 season and finished World No.22, a career best. She climbed her first senior World Cup podium with a bronze medal at Orléans in 2007. She missed out however for the 2008 Summer Olympics. She was severely injured in a car crash in late 2008 and sustained several operations which left her out for a full season.
