= James Strauch =

American fencer

Personal information
- Born: September 30, 1921 New York, New York, United States
- Died: November 30, 1998 (aged 77) Mercer Island, WA, United States
- Height: 5’9״

Sport
- Country: USA
- Sport: Fencing
- Events: Epee, Foil
- College team: City College of New York
- Club: Salle Montague of New York and the Fencers Club

James Strauch (September 30, 1921 – November 30, 1998) was an American Olympic fencer.

== Early and personal life ==
Strauch was born in New York, New York, and was Jewish. He attended City College of New York (CCNY) for college, and graduated in 1942 with a degree in business administration. He later went to graduate school at Georgetown University, and became a certified public accountant (CPA). He worked as a senior accountant at H. L. Green.

== Fencing career ==
Strauch represented Salle Montague of New York and the Fencers Club of New York. In college, he fenced for CCNY.

He was the US Epee Champion in 1947. Strauch also competed in the team épée event at the 1952 Summer Olympics.

== See also ==
- List of USFA Division I National Champions
