= Herbert Cohen (fencer) =

American fencer (born 1940)

Personal information
- Full name: Herbert Morris Cohen
- Born: June 7, 1940 (age 86) New York City, New York, U.S.
- Home town: Brighton Beach, Brooklyn, New York

Sport
- Country: United States
- Sport: Fencing
- Event: Foil
- University team: New York University
- Club: Fencers Club
- Coached by: Michel Alaux
Medal record
Men's fencing
Representing United States
NCAA Fencing Championships
Gold medal – first place	1961 Princeton	Individual Foil
Silver medal – second place	1962 Columbus	Individual Foil
Pan American Games
Bronze medal – third place	1963 São Paulo	Individual Foil
Gold medal – first place	1963 São Paulo	Team Foil
US National Champion
Gold medal – first place	1964 Atlantic City	Foil

Herbert (Herb) Morris Cohen (born June 7, 1940) is an American Olympic foil fencer. He is a two-time NCAA foil champion, a U.S. national champion, a team Pan American Games champion, and a two-time Olympian. Later, as a coach he led New York University to an NCAA national championship. He fences left-handed.

== Early and personal life ==
Cohen is Jewish, was born in Manhattan in New York City, and grew up in Brighton Beach, Brooklyn, New York, where he attended public school. He has also lived in Holmdel Township, New Jersey. His elder brother was the Olympic épée and saber fencer Abe Cohen, who competed for the United States in the 1956 Summer Olympics.

He married in 1961, and the couple adopted a child five years later. After he graduated from college, starting in 1962 Cohen worked as an elementary school teacher.

== Fencing career ==
=== High school and college ===
Cohen started fencing at the age of 15, and fenced at Abraham Lincoln High School in Brooklyn, New York. He was captain of the fencing team, which included his best friend, future singer Neil Diamond.

He then was recruited by and attended New York University (NYU; class of 1962). There, he fenced for the NYU Violets alongside, among others, Neil Diamond and future Olympian Eugene Glazer. In 1961, he went undefeated during the year and won the NCAA foil championship. Fencing for NYU in 1962 he won his second straight NCAA Championship in foil, winning 31 of his 33 bouts, and was also named national college Fencer of the Year (awarded on the basis of "sportsmanship and conduct on the strip, attitude and dress, and past performances in the Championships and in over-all intercollegiate competition"). He was a three-time All-American.

=== Maccabiah Games, Pan American Games, and U.S. nationals ===
He fenced for the Fencers Club in New York, and was coached by French-American Olympic coach Michel Alaux. He competed at the 1961 Maccabiah Games in Israel.

Cohen won a gold medal in team foil and a bronze medal in individual foil at the 1963 Pan American Games in São Paulo, Brazil. In 1964, Cohen won the Amateur Fencers League of America (AFLA) US National Fencing Championship in foil, while Olympian Albie Axelrod took the silver medal and Olympian Eugene Glazer took the bronze medal in Atlantic City, New Jersey.

=== Olympics and philosophy ===
Cohen competed in both the individual foil and team foil events at the 1964 Summer Olympics in Tokyo, Japan, at the age of 24, and in both the individual foil and the team foil events at the 1968 Summer Olympics in Mexico City, Mexico, at the age of 28. At the 1964 Olympics in Tokyo, Team USA defeated Romania and Argentina but lost to France, and did not advance to the semifinals.

As to his philosophy of fencing, Cohen said: "I always fought as if my life depended on it."

== Coaching career ==
In the early 1970s, he coached at the Fencers Club. He was the head fencing coach at NYU from 1975 to 1977, and led the team to the 1976 NCAA Championship. In 1977 he coached the fencing team at Stuyvesant High School in Manhattan, New York City. Starting in 2011 and through at least 2016, he coached Teaneck High School. He also coached at Manhattan College.

== Hall of Fame and honors ==
In 1995, Cohen was inducted into the NYU Hall of Fame. In 2003, he received the YMCA Thomas L. Dell Torre Special Achievement Award.

== See also ==
- List of NCAA fencing champions
- List of USFA Division I National Champions
