= Sherif Farrag =

Egyptian-American fencer (born 1987)

Personal information
- Born: April 11, 1987 (age 39)

Sport
- Country: Egypt
- Sport: Fencing

Sherif Farrag (born April 11, 1987) is an Egyptian-American fencer. He represented Egypt at the 2012 Summer Olympics in the team foil event. He represented the United States in World Cup competition before switching to Egypt.

Born and raised in Bayonne, New Jersey, Farrag captained the fencing team at Bayonne High School.

Farrag graduated from Columbia University, where he competed on the Columbia Lions fencing team, in 2009.
