= Harvard Crimson fencing =

American college fencing team

- First season: 1888; 138 years ago
- Home stadium: Malkin Athletic Center
- Location: Cambridge, Massachusetts
- League: NCAA Division I
- Conference: Ivy League
- National Titles: 2006, 2024
- Rivalries: Columbia Lions fencing
- All-Americans: 73
- Fight song: Ten Thousand Men of Harvard
- Mascot: Harvard Crimson
- Website: gocrimson.com/fencing

The Harvard Crimson fencing team is the intercollegiate fencing team for Harvard University located in Cambridge, Massachusetts. The team competes in the Ivy League within the NCAA Division I. The university first fielded a team in 1888.

== History ==
Harvard founded the first collegiate fencing team in the United States in 1888. The team has captured seven individual NCAA titles.

Eli Dershwitz (saber) was the seventh Harvard fencer to compete in the Olympics when he fenced for Team USA at the 2016 Rio Olympics, with the prior two having been Emily Cross '09 (Team USA; she won a silver medal in team foil) and Noam Mills '12 (Team Israel; épée), who both competed in the 2008 Beijing Olympics. Cross and Mills were the first Harvard University female fencers to qualify for the Olympics.

== Notable former fencers ==
=== Harvard's Athlete of the Year Recipients ===
- Emily Cross, 2006 Female
- Benji Ungar, 2006 Male

=== Other ===
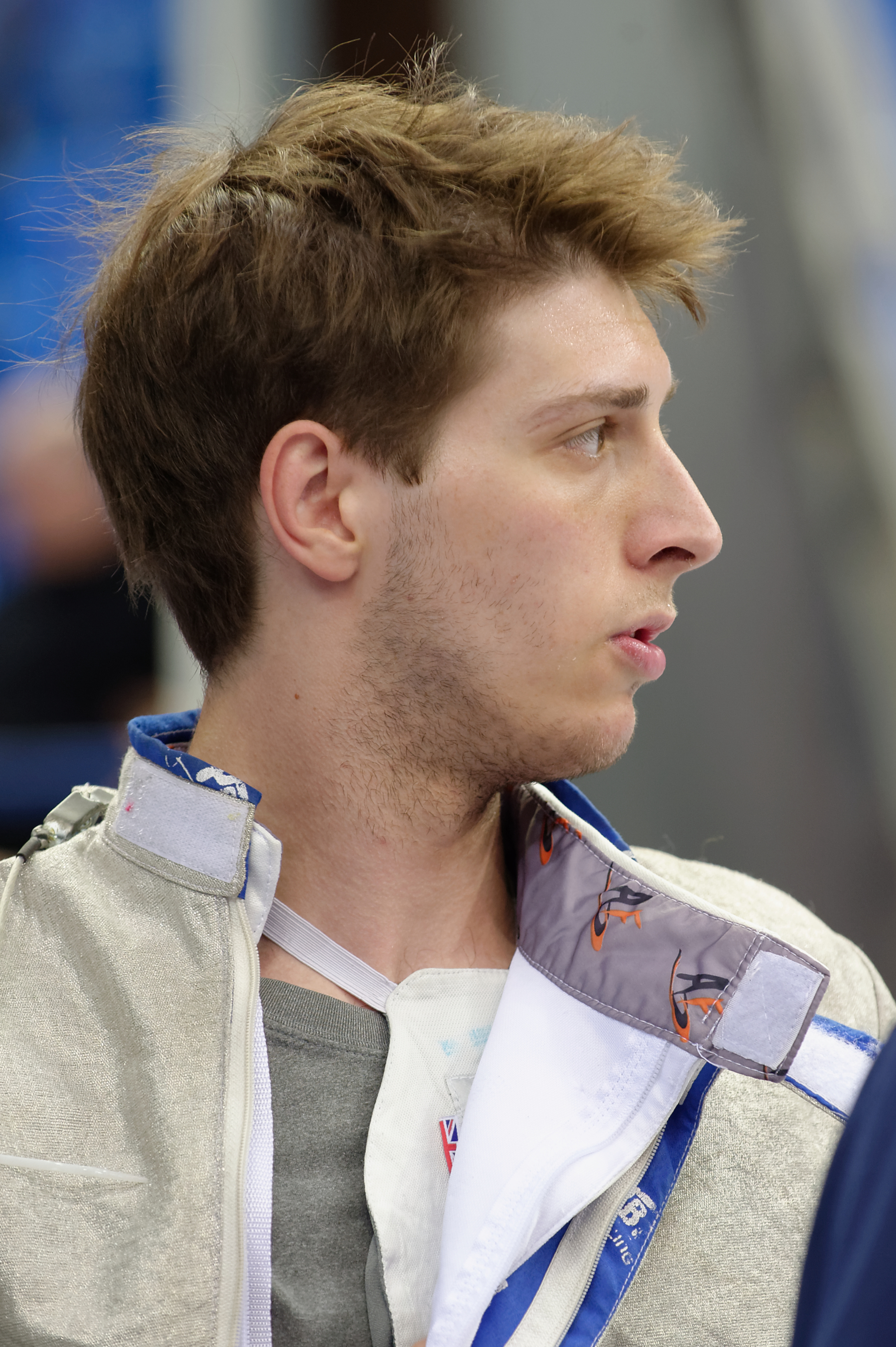
Fencer Eli Dershwitz

- Eli Dershwitz, 2023 World Saber Champion, 2015 Under-20 World Saber Champion, US Olympic saber fencer, #1 in the world in saber as of July 2018.
- Noam Mills, Junior World Champion and Israeli Olympic épée fencer.

== Student admission controversy ==
On November 16, 2020, former longtime Harvard Crimson fencing coach Peter Brand was arrested and charged under federal law with accepting over $1.5 million in bribes to arrange for the two sons of Maryland business Jie (Jack) Zhao to be admitted to the university as fencing recruits. Zhao was arrested and charged with making the bribes as well.

Peter Brand and Jie Zhao were found innocent in 2022 after only 5 hours of deliberation by the jury.

== Championships ==
=== NCAA Championships individual winners ===
- 1987 - Jim O'Neill '88 in épée.
- 1994 - Kwame van Leeuwen '94 in foil.
- 2005 - Emily Cross '09 in foil.
- 2006 - Benji Ungar ’09 in épée.
- 2007 - Tim Hagamen '07 in saber.
- 2010 - Caroline Vloka '12 in saber.
- 2011 - Alexandra Kiefer '14 in foil.
- 2014 - Adrienne Jarocki '17 in saber.
- 2016 - Adrienne Jarocki '17 in saber.
- 2017 - Eli Dershwitz in saber.
- 2018 - Eli Dershwitz in saber.
- 2022 - Elizabeth Tartakovsky in saber.
- 2022 - Filip Dolegiewicz in saber.
- 2023 - Jonas Hansen in épée.
- 2023 - Lauren Scruggs in foil.
- 2024 - Emily Vermeule in épée.
- 2024 - Jessica Guo in foil.
- 2026 - Jessica Guo in foil.

=== NCAA Championships overall ===
- 2006 Champions
- 2024 Champions

=== IFA Championships individual winners ===
- 2009 - Benji Ungar ’09 in épée.
- 2009 - Caroline Vloka '12 in saber.
