= Joel Glucksman =

American fencer (born 1949)

Personal information
- Full name: Joel Arthur Glucksman
- Born: February 14, 1949 (age 77) New York, New York, United States

Sport
- Country: United States
- Sport: Fencing
- Event: saber
- College team: Columbia Lions fencing team
- Club: Fencers Club
- Now coaching: The Browning School

Joel Arthur Glucksman (born February 14, 1949) is an American Olympic saber fencer.

== Early and personal life ==
Glucksman was born in New York City, and is Jewish. He later lived on the Upper West Side in Manhattan, New York.

== Fencing career ==
Glucksman attended Columbia University, where he fenced for the Columbia Lions fencing team. He graduated in 1970.

He fenced with the New York Fencers Club. Glucksman won a silver medal in individual saber at the 1977 Maccabiah Games.

In May 1982, his article "In Fencing you Get in Touch with Yourself as well as Your Opponent" was published by Sports Illustrated.

Glucksman competed on behalf of the United States in the team sabre event at the 1984 Summer Olympics in Los Angeles at the age of 35.

Glucksman worked as an assistant fencing coach, physical education teacher, and administrator at Columbia University, and as fencing coach for the Brooklyn College men's fencing team and at The Browning School. He also became a documentary filmmaker.
