= Las Vegas Aviators =

- Founded in 1983; Summerlin South, Nevada
Team logo
Cap insignia

Minor league affiliations
- Class: Triple-A (1983–present)
- League: Pacific Coast League (1983–present)
- Division: West Division

Major league affiliations
- Team: Oakland Athletics / Athletics (2019–present)
- Previous teams: New York Mets (2013–2018); Toronto Blue Jays (2009–2012); Los Angeles Dodgers (2001–2008); San Diego Padres (1983–2000)

Minor league titles
- League titles (3): 1986; 1988; 2025
- Division titles (6): 1986; 1988; 2002; 2013; 2014; 2019
- First-half titles (6): 1983; 1984; 1988; 1992; 2025; 2026
- Second-half titles (3): 1986; 1987; 1996

Team data
- Name: Las Vegas Aviators (2019–present)
- Previous names: Las Vegas 51s (2001–2018); Las Vegas Stars (1983–2000)
- Colors: Navy blue, orange, tangerine, gold, yellow, gray
- Mascot: Spruce the Goose and The Aviator
- Ballpark: Las Vegas Ballpark (2019–present)
- Previous parks: Cashman Field (1983–2018)
- Owner/ Operator: Seaport Entertainment Group
- Manager: Fran Riordan
- Website: milb.com/las-vegas

The Las Vegas Aviators, formerly known as the Las Vegas 51s and Las Vegas Stars, are a Minor League Baseball team of the Pacific Coast League (PCL) and the Triple-A affiliate of the Athletics. They are located in Summerlin South, Nevada, a community in Las Vegas. The Aviators play their home games at Las Vegas Ballpark, a 10,000-seat facility which opened in 2019. The team previously played at Cashman Field from 1983 to 2018.

The team has been members of the Pacific Coast League since 1983, including the 2021 season when it was known as the Triple-A West. They won the PCL championship as the Stars in 1986 and 1988 and again in 2025 as the Aviators.

== History ==
=== Las Vegas Stars (1983–2000) ===
The Las Vegas Pacific Coast League franchise traces its roots to the Portland Beavers who entered the PCL in 1919 after a two-year hiatus. The team relocated to Spokane, Washington, in 1973, becoming the Spokane Indians. The franchise moved once again in 1983, becoming the Las Vegas Stars.

The Stars, who were the Triple-A affiliate of the San Diego Padres, became the first professional sports team to play in Las Vegas since the Las Vegas Quicksilvers soccer club who played a single season in 1977. The Stars' inaugural season was quite successful, posting an 83–60 record and winning the first-half championship for the Southern Division leading to a playoff berth, but eventually losing to the Albuquerque Dukes. The following season, the Stars posted another successful campaign, going 71–65 and winning their second division championship (first half), but ultimately losing in the league semifinals to the Hawaii Islanders. After a dismal 1985 campaign, the Stars finished the 1986 season with an 80–62 record and won the second half of the Southern Division. In the league semifinals, the Stars defeated the Phoenix Firebirds, 3–2, and went on to win their first PCL championship, defeating the Vancouver Canadians in five games. The Stars won their second PCL championship in 1988, once again defeating Vancouver, this time in four games.

After winning five division titles and two league championships in their first six years, the Stars hit a skid, posting a .500 or better record only four times and winning shares of only two division championships in the following 12 years. The Stars were unable to advance past the first round of the playoffs in both seasons that they qualified. The team's affiliation with the Padres ended after the 2000 season.

=== Las Vegas 51s (2001–2018) ===
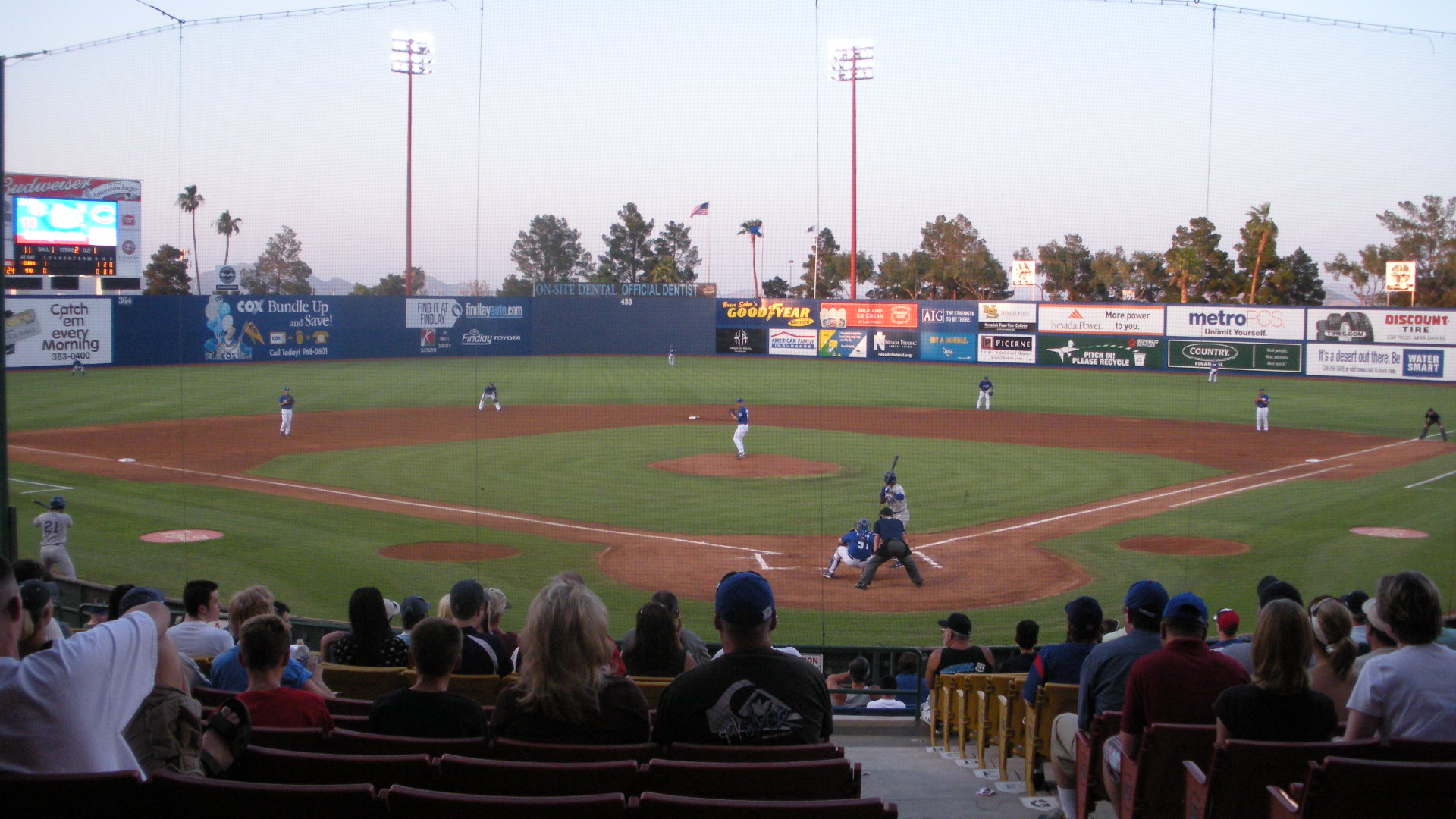
A Las Vegas 51s baseball game against the Iowa Cubs at Cashman Field in 2008

In 2001, Las Vegas became the top farm club of the Los Angeles Dodgers. The new affiliation was accompanied by rebranding to the Las Vegas 51s in reference to Area 51, a military base located north-northwest of Las Vegas legendary for rumors of its housing UFOs and other extraterrestrial technology. The team adopted a logo featuring a grey alien head and introduced an extraterrestrial mascot named Cosmo.

A new affiliate, moniker, and appearance did not translate into improved performance on the field. The 51s experienced only two winning seasons during their eight years as the Triple-A Dodgers. Their only division title came under manager Brad Mills in 2002 as the team posted the best record in the league at 85–59, but lost three games to one to the eventual PCL champion Edmonton Trappers.

On March 24, 2008, Mandalay Baseball Properties sold the 51s franchise to Stevens Baseball Group. There were no plans to move the team, and talks of building a new stadium to replace the ageing Cashman Field became stagnant. The Dodgers and the 51s had a rocky relationship during their eight-year affiliation. The Dodgers were not pleased with Cashman Field, which barely met the standards for Triple-A baseball. It had no weight room or indoor batting cages, and it was decrepit compared to other stadiums in the league. Citing the inadequacies of Cashman and lack of planning for a replacement, Los Angeles decided not to renew their player development contract (PDC) with Las Vegas after the 2008 season.

Following the departure of the Los Angeles Dodgers, the 51s signed a PDC with the Toronto Blue Jays, marking the first time that the 51s were affiliated with an American League club. The only time the team finished over .500 with the Blue Jays was in 2012 when Marty Brown led the team to a 79–64 second-place finish. The Blue Jays ended their affiliation with the 51s after the season.

In April 2013, the team was purchased for $20 million by Summerlin Las Vegas Baseball Club, a 50/50 joint venture of The Howard Hughes Corporation and Play Ball Owners Group, including investors Steve Mack, Bart Wear, and Chris Kaempfer, with intentions of moving it to a proposed stadium in Summerlin near the Red Rock Resort Spa and Casino. Howard Hughes later bought out the Play Ball group in 2017, becoming the sole owner of the team.

The 51s became affiliated with the New York Mets in 2013 when they were the only Triple-A team left without an MLB parent. They won back-to-back division titles in 2013 and 2014 under manager Wally Backman, but were eliminated in the Pacific Conference championship series on both occasions.

In 2017 the 51s became one of the first teams to participate in the Copa de la Diversión initiative and for selected games played as the Reyes de Plata ("Silver Kings"). The name was a nod to Nevada being the "Silver State" and a homage to the contribution migrant workers made to the mining industry of Nevada.

In October 2017, the Las Vegas Convention and Visitors Authority approved a 20-year, $80 million naming rights agreement to help pay for the new $150 million 10,000-seat ballpark which opened in 2019. Las Vegas Ballpark, located in Summerlin, includes 22 suites, a center field pool, kids' zone, and several bars. Construction began in 2018 and was completed for the 2019 season.

In late 2017, the Mets announced plans to move its Triple-A affiliation to the Syracuse Mets beginning in 2019, meaning the 51s would be in need of a new major league affiliate.

=== Las Vegas Aviators (2019–present) ===
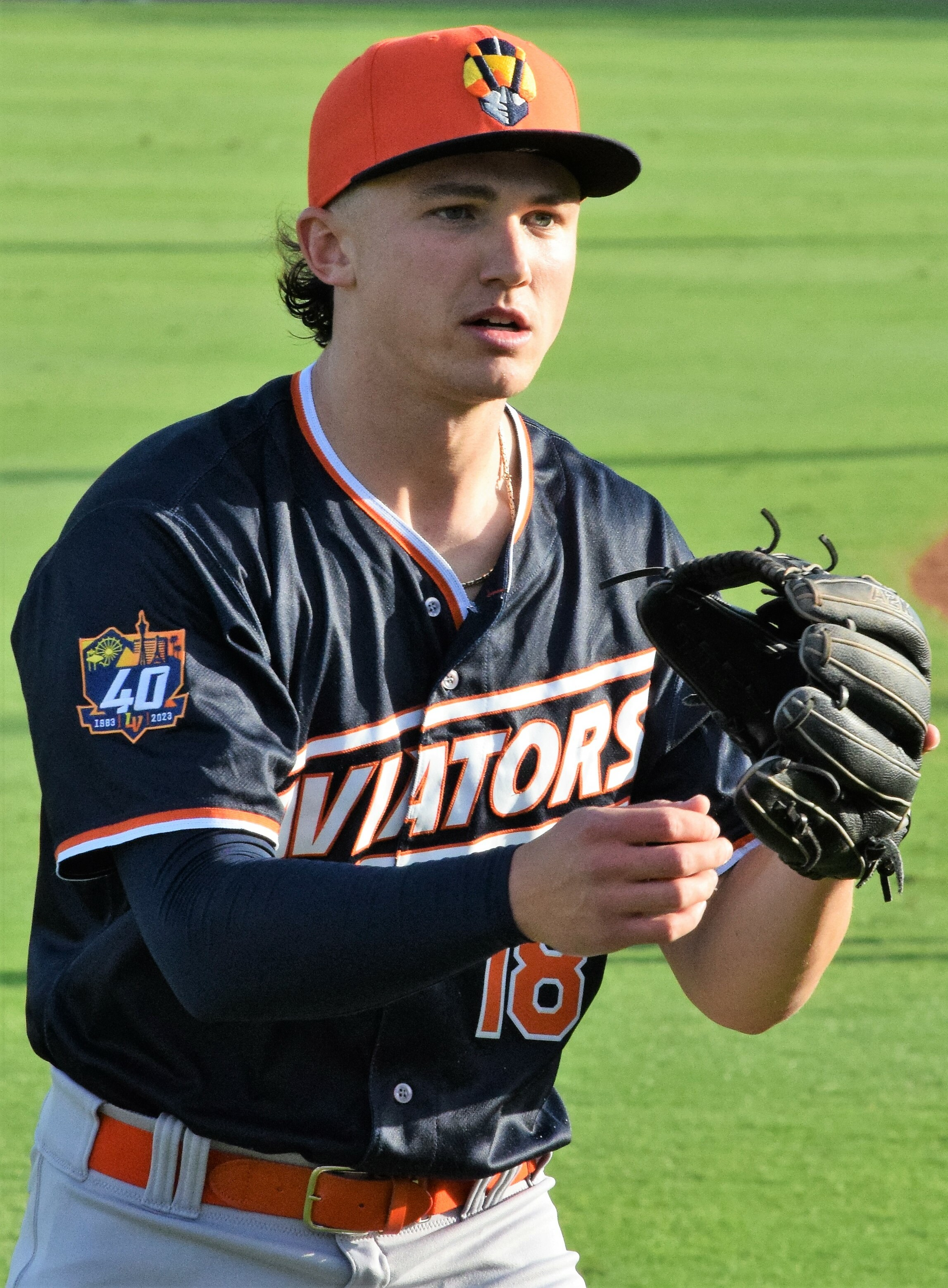
Zack Gelof playing for the Aviators in 2023

Following the conclusion of the 2018 season, Las Vegas signed a two-year PDC with the then Oakland Athletics that ran through 2020. In addition to having a new major league affiliate in 2019 and playing in a new ballpark, the team also changed its name to the Las Vegas Aviators. The name is in reference to aviation pioneer Howard Hughes. The team's new logo depicts a pilot wearing a flight helmet and utilizes their new color scheme of navy blue, orange, tangerine, gold, yellow, and gray. Their first home game at Las Vegas Ballpark was a 10–2 win against the Sacramento River Cats on April 9 before a sellout crowd of 11,036. Las Vegas secured the win with a five-run second inning in which Skye Bolt scored the winning run when he came home on a fielding error. Aviators pitchers Chris Bassitt and Daniel Mengden combined to strikeout 14 Sacramento batters.

The start of the 2020 season was postponed due to the COVID-19 pandemic before ultimately being cancelled on June 30.

With the 2021 Major League Baseball restructuring of Minor League Baseball, the Aviators were organized into the Triple-A West. Las Vegas ended the season in third place in the Western Division with a 62–58 record. No playoffs were held to determine a league champion; instead, the team with the best regular-season record was declared the winner. However, 10 games that had been postponed from the start of the season were reinserted into the schedule as a postseason tournament called the Triple-A Final Stretch in which all 30 Triple-A clubs competed for the highest winning percentage. Las Vegas finished the tournament tied for 13th place with a 3–3 record.

In 2022, the Triple-A West became known as the Pacific Coast League, the name historically used by the regional circuit prior to the 2021 reorganization.

In 2024, ownership of the team and stadium transferred to Seaport Entertainment Group, a spin-off from Howard Hughes Holdings.

The Aviators qualified for the 2025 postseason with a first-half title win. They defeated the Tacoma Rainiers, 2–0, to win the PCL championship. In the Triple-A National Championship Game versus the International League champion Jacksonville Jumbo Shrimp, Las Vegas was defeated, 8–7.

Las Vegas won the 2026 first-half title with a 44–29 record. Overall, they finished second in the league at 87–61. They were defeated by the second-half champion Oklahoma City Comets, 2–1, in a best-of-three series for the PCL championship.

== Season-by-season records ==
Key
League	The team's final position in the league standings
Division	The team's final position in the divisional standings
GB	Games behind the team that finished in first place in the division that season
‡	Class champions (1983–present)
†	League champions (1983–present)
§	Conference champions (1998–2020)
*	Division champions (1983–2022)
^	Postseason berth (1983–present)

Season-by-season records
Season	League	Regular season					Postseason			MLB affiliate	Ref.
Season	League	Record	Win %	League	Division	GB	Record	Win %	Result	MLB affiliate	Ref.
1983^	PCL	83–60	.580	2nd	2nd	2	2–3	.400	Result	Won First Half Southern Division title Lost Southern Division title vs. Albuquerque Dukes, 3–2	San Diego Padres
1984^	PCL	71–65	.522	3rd	2nd	14	1–3	.250	Won First Half Southern Division title Lost Southern Division title vs. Hawaii Islanders, 3–1	San Diego Padres	
1985	PCL	65–79	.451	10th	5th	19 1/2	—	—	—	San Diego Padres	
1986^ * †	PCL	80–62	.563	3rd	2nd	1	6–4	.600	Won Second Half Southern Division title Won Southern Division title vs. Phoenix Firebirds, 3–2; Won PCL championship vs. Vancouver Canadians, 3–2	San Diego Padres	
1987^	PCL	69–73	.486	7th	4th	8	0–3	.000	Won Second Half Southern Division title Lost Southern Division title vs. Albuquerque Dukes, 3–0	San Diego Padres	
1988^ * †	PCL	74–66	.529	4th	2nd	11	6–1	.857	Won First Half Southern Division title Won Southern Division title vs. Albuquerque Dukes, 3–0; Won PCL championship vs. Vancouver Canadians, 3–1	San Diego Padres	
1989	PCL	74–69	.517	4th	3rd	6 1/2	—	—	—	San Diego Padres	
1990	PCL	58–86	.403	9th (tie)	5th	34	—	—	—	San Diego Padres	
1991	PCL	65–75	.464	8th	5th	16	—	—	—	San Diego Padres	
1992^	PCL	74–70	.514	5th	2nd	11 1/2	2–3	.400	Won First Half Southern Division title Lost Southern Division title vs. Colorado Springs Sky Sox, 3–2	San Diego Padres	
1993	PCL	58–85	.406	10th	5th	25	—	—	—	San Diego Padres	
1994	PCL	56–87	.392	10th	5th	29	—	—	—	San Diego Padres	
1995	PCL	61–83	.424	9th	5th	26 1/2	—	—	—	San Diego Padres	
1996^	PCL	73–67	.521	3rd (tie)	1st	—	0–3	.000	Won Second Half Southern Division title Lost Southern Division title vs. Phoenix Firebirds, 3–0	San Diego Padres	
1997	PCL	56–85	.397	10th	5th	31	—	—	—	San Diego Padres	
1998	PCL	70–72	.493	11th	3rd	10 1/2	—	—	—	San Diego Padres	
1999	PCL	67–75	.472	11th	3rd	6 1/2	—	—	—	San Diego Padres	
2000	PCL	73–70	.510	7th	2nd	16 1/2	—	—	—	San Diego Padres	
2001	PCL	68–76	.472	11th	3rd	7	—	—	—	Los Angeles Dodgers	
2002 *	PCL	85–59	.590	1st	1st	—	1–3	.250	Won Pacific Conference Southern Division title Lost Pacific Conference title vs. Edmonton Trappers, 3–1	Los Angeles Dodgers	
2003	PCL	76–66	.535	3rd	2nd	15	—	—	—	Los Angeles Dodgers	
2004	PCL	67–76	.469	11th	3rd	11 1/2	—	—	—	Los Angeles Dodgers	
2005	PCL	57–86	.399	16th	4th	22 1/2	—	—	—	Los Angeles Dodgers	
2006	PCL	67–77	.465	12th	3rd	24	—	—	—	Los Angeles Dodgers	
2007	PCL	67–77	.465	13th	4th	17	—	—	—	Los Angeles Dodgers	
2008	PCL	74–69	.517	7th	2nd	8 1/2	—	—	—	Los Angeles Dodgers	
2009	PCL	71–73	.493	10th (tie)	3rd (tie)	15 1/2	—	—	—	Toronto Blue Jays	
2010	PCL	66–78	.458	12th	4th	13	—	—	—	Toronto Blue Jays	
2011	PCL	71–73	.493	6th (tie)	2nd	17	—	—	—	Toronto Blue Jays	
2012	PCL	79–64	.552	5th	2nd	6 1/2	—	—	—	Toronto Blue Jays	
2013 *	PCL	81–63	.563	2nd	1st	—	1–3	.250	Won Pacific Conference Southern Division title Lost Pacific Conference title vs. Salt Lake Bees, 3–1	New York Mets	
2014 *	PCL	81–63	.563	1st (tie)	1st	—	1–3	.250	Won Pacific Conference Southern Division title Lost Pacific Conference title vs. Reno Aces, 3–1	New York Mets	
2015	PCL	77–67	.535	7th	2nd	1	—	—	—	New York Mets	
2016	PCL	70–74	.486	10th (tie)	3rd	3 1/2	—	—	—	New York Mets	
2017	PCL	56–86	.394	16th	4th	17	—	—	—	New York Mets	
2018	PCL	71–69	.507	9th	3rd	11 1/2	—	—	—	New York Mets	
2019 *	PCL	83–57	.593	2nd	1st	—	2–3	.400	Won Pacific Conference Southern Division title Lost Pacific Conference title vs. Sacramento River Cats, 3–2	Oakland Athletics	
2020	PCL	Season cancelled (COVID-19 pandemic)								Oakland Athletics	
2021	AAAW	65–61 (Note: In 2021, the team with the best record at the end of the regular-season was declared the Triple-A West champion. Las Vegas had a 62–58 (.517) record, 11 games behind first place, which put them 4th in the league and 3rd in their division. The regular-season was followed by the Triple-A Final Stretch, a 10-game postseason tournament in which all 30 Triple-A clubs competed for the highest winning percentage. Las Vegas finished the tournament tied for 13th place with a 3–3 (.500) record.)	.516	6th	3rd	11	—	—	—	Oakland Athletics	
2022	PCL	71–79	.473	7th	3rd	15	—	—	—	Oakland Athletics	
2023	PCL	75–74	.503	5th	3rd	12 1/2	—	—	—	Oakland Athletics	
2024	PCL	74–75	.497	6th	4th	7 1/2	—	—	—	Oakland Athletics	
2025^ †	PCL	83–67	.553	3rd	2nd	3	2–1	.333	Won first-half title Won PCL championship vs. Tacoma Rainiers, 2–0; Lost Triple-A championship vs. Jacksonville Jumbo Shrimp, 1–0	Athletics	
2026^	PCL	87–61	.588	2nd	1st	—	1–2	.333	Won first-half title Lost PCL championship vs. Oklahoma City Comets, 2–1	Athletics	
Totals	—	3,049–3,099	.496	—	—	—	25–35	.417	—	—	—

== Media ==
The Las Vegas Aviators are covered by Las Vegas' two daily newspapers, the Las Vegas Review-Journal and Las Vegas Sun. Every Aviators game is broadcast by KRLV 920-AM, with Russ Langer and Matt Neverett as the broadcast's play-by-play men. Several prominent sports radio and television personalities made their start as broadcaster for the Stars and 51s, most notably Fox Sports' Colin Cowherd.

=== Broadcasters ===
- Bob Blum (1985–2005)
- Dick Calvert (1983)
- Colin Cowherd (1987–1988)
- Joe Hawk (1983)
- Ken Korach (1989–1995)
- Russ Langer (2000–present)
- Matt Neverett (2021–present)
- Tim Neverett (1996–2003, 2005–2006)
- Paul Olden (1984–1987)
- Jerry Reuss (1994–1995, 1999, 2005–present)
- Jon Sandler (1993–1999)
- Dom Valentino (1983–1985, 1987–1989)
- Rich Waltz (1990–1992)

== Roster ==
Las Vegas Aviators roster
Players		Coaches/Other
Pitchers: 14 Jamie Arnold; -- Henry Baez; 38 Andrew Bash; -- Blake Beers; 18 Nathan Dettmer; -- Joey Estes; 36 Jackson Finley; 54 Jake Garland; 45 James Gonzalez; -- Geoff Hartlieb; 30 Nick Hernandez; 49 Jared Johnson; 46 Wei-En Lin; 46 Ryan Magdic; 56 Gustavo Rodriguez; 51 Wander Suero	Catchers: 1 Cole Conn; 91 Davis Diaz; 27 Bryan Lavastida; -- Anthony Marnell IV; -- Brian Serven; 4 Chad Wallach; Infielders: 7 Colby Halter; 11 Luke Mann; 8 Justin Riemer; -- Michael Stefanic; 6 Drew Swift; Outfielders: 21 Brayan Buelvas; 16 Jared Dickey; -- Johnathan Rodríguez; 26 Devin Taylor	Manager: 39 Fran Riordan; Coaches: 48 Paul Abbott (pitching); 55 Kevin Kouzmanoff (assistant hitting); 24 Brian McArn (hitting); 37 Don Schulze (assistant pitching); 7-day injured list; * On Athletics 40-man roster; ~ Development list; # Rehab assignment; ∞ Reserve list; ‡ Restricted list; § Suspended list; † Temporarily inactive list; Roster updated October 29, 2026; Transactions; → More rosters: MiLB • Pacific Coast League; → Athletics minor league players

== Award winners ==
=== PCL MVP ===
- 1983 – Kevin McReynolds
- 1986 – Tim Pyznarski
- 1988 – Sandy Alomar Jr.
- 1989 – Sandy Alomar Jr.
- 2001 – Phil Hiatt
- 2009 – Randy Ruiz
- 2010 – J. P. Arencibia

=== PCL Rookie of the Year ===
- 2017 – Amed Rosario

=== PCL Manager of the Year ===
- 2002 – Brad Mills
- 2014 – Wally Backman
- 2019 – Fran Riordan
- 2023 – Fran Riordan
- 2025 – Fran Riordan

=== PCL Executive of the Year ===
- 1992 – Don Logan
- 1998 – Don Logan
- 2018 – Don Logan

== Notable alumni ==
- Roberto Alomar
- Sandy Alomar Jr.
- Pete Alonso
- Carlos Baerga
- Adrian Beltre
- Bruce Bochy
- Larry Bowa (manager)
- Jolbert Cabrera
- Chin-Feng Chen
- Michael Conforto
- David Cooper
- Joey Cora
- Ike Davis
- Cody Decker
- Jacob deGrom
- Edwin Encarnación
- Andre Ethier
- Wilmer Flores
- Éric Gagné
- Nomar Garciaparra (rehab)
- Robert Gsellman
- Vladimir Guerrero
- Ozzie Guillén
- Tony Gwynn
- D. J. Houlton
- Edwin Jackson
- Matt Kemp
- Ty Kelly
- John Kruk
- Seth Lugo
- Russell Martin
- Gary Matthews Jr.
- Steven Matz
- Kevin McReynolds
- Brad Mills (Manager)
- Norihiro Nakamura
- T. J. Rivera
- Amed Rosario
- Cody Ross
- David Ross
- Jerry Royster (Manager)
- Benito Santiago
- Dominic Smith
- Noah Syndergaard
- Joe Thurston
- Kevin Towers (General Manager)
- Shane Victorino
- Jayson Werth
- Zack Wheeler
- Steve Yeager (hitting coach)
