= Michel Alaux =

French-American fencer (1924–1974)

Maitre Michel Alaux (1924 – 30 December 1974) was a French-American fencer who co-coached the United States' Olympic fencing teams in 1964, 1968, and 1972. Internationally recognized for his achievements in the sport and his regular contributions to fencing publications, he has been credited with developing a holistic approach to fencing that helped to bridge the gap between classical schools and the modern Olympic fencing style.

== Biography ==
=== Early life and career ===
Michel Alaux graduated from the military college Fort Carré d'Antibes in 1947 and established himself in his club, L'Association Jean Louis in Montpellier, France. There, he trained a number of foil and épée pupils, the most well-known being Christian D'Oriola, named Fencer of the 20th Century by the International Fencing Federation (FIE).

At the 1952 Helsinki Olympics, Christian d'Oriola won two gold medals for individual and team foil, winning all ten bouts in the team events.

Alaux was also awarded two Medals of Honor by the French Government's Ministry of Sports in recognition of his contribution to fencing: Bronze, in 1949, for the World Championships, followed by gold, in 1952, for the Helsinki Olympics.

=== Career in the United States ===
In 1956, Alaux was invited to the United States by the NY Fencers Club. He served three times as US Fencing Olympic coach: 1964 Summer Olympics, Tokyo; 1968 Summer Olympics, Mexico City; 1972 Summer Olympics, Munich; and several times as the US Nationals, Pan American, and World Championship coach. He remained head fencing master of the NY Fencers Club until his death in 1974, at the age of fifty. Among his notable students were 2x Olympian Herb Cohen, Olympian Jeffrey Checkes, Olympian James Melcher, Olympian John Nonna, Olympian Ruth White, and Neal Cohen.

In the course of his US fencing career, Alaux played a key role in developing American fencing official standards and professional requirements. He chaired the 1962–63 U.S. Committee which developed A Text for Defining Fencing Terms. He chaired and directed the committee which devised the official examination for the first professional diploma of Fencing Master in the US (1965).

He served as a fencing consultant to TV, newspapers & magazines.

For his contributions to sports education and culture, he was inducted into l'Ordre des Palmes Académiques in 1962.

=== Career as an author ===
He was a contributor to US, UK, and French fencing journals. He is the author of Modern Fencing (Charles Scribner's Sons New York. 1975. ISBN 0684141167).

== Legacy ==
Following his death in 1974, twelve annual US Grand Open competitions (1975–1987) were named after him: The Michel Alaux Grand Open was a three-day international event "considered essentially the same as the Nationals." He was inducted into the US Fencing Hall of Fame in 2006.

== See also ==
- List of USFA Hall of Fame members
