= James Melcher =

American fencer (1939–2023)

James Laurence Melcher
- Born: November 5, 1939; Pittsfield, Massachusetts, U.S.
- Died: April 17, 2023 (aged 83); Manhattan, New York, U.S.
- Education: Columbia University (BA)
- Occupation: Hedge fund manager
- Known for: Fencing, Balestra Capital Management

James Laurence Melcher (November 5, 1939 – April 17, 2023) was an American hedge fund manager and Olympic fencer. He competed in the individual and team épée events at the 1972 Summer Olympics in Munich, Germany.

== Early and personal life ==
Melcher grew up in Pittsfield, Massachusetts, and was Jewish. He attended Columbia University, from which he graduated with a B.A. in English in 1961.

== Fencing career ==
Melcher first learned to fence during his freshman year with the Columbia Lions fencing team. During college he enlisted into the US Army Reserve, and was on active duty for six months. He graduated in 1961, and afterwards remained in New York to work on Wall Street. However, he continued fencing at the Fencers Club in his free time, and took lessons for several years from Hall of Famer Michel Alaux. Two years later, he was a 1963 Pan American Games team member.

Around age 30, Melcher "finally broke through as a top fencer," when he defeated the world's No. 1 fencer in the 1970 Martini Épée Challenge.

At the 1971 Pan American Games, Melcher won a gold medal in team épée and a bronze medal in individual épée. Melcher was a two-time US National Champion, winning in Men's Individual Épée in both 1971 and 1972.

Melcher competed for the United States in the 1972 Summer Olympics in Munich. Melcher was a first alternate for the 1968 Summer Olympics and the 1976 Summer Olympics, and a second alternate for the 1980 Summer Olympics.

His competitive fencing career largely ended in 1974, when he developed chronic fatigue syndrome, from which he had since recovered. Melcher became Chairman of the Fencers Club in the late 1970s and served for a decade, and became Chairman again in 2006. Melcher is a member of the US Fencing Hall of Fame.

== Finance career; Balestra Capital Management ==
Melcher maintained that for both investing and fencing, one needs "a high level of self-control, particularly control over emotional reactions".

Melcher began his Wall Street career in the Equity Sales Department of A.G. Becker. After six years, Melcher formed First Venture Fund, a venture capital fund that he managed for ten years.

Melcher founded Balestra Capital Management, a global macro hedge fund manager, in 1979, and it became an SEC-registered investment adviser in 1987. Melcher named the firm after the 'balestra', a fencing move involving a sudden leap forward, but which also sometimes "dictates a strategic retreat."

Melcher started Balestra Capital Partners in 1991. As of 2004, it had an annual return of 22.84% a year, compared to the annual return of the S&P 500 of 13.14%.

Melcher started Balestra Spectrum in 1999. As of 2004, it had an annual return of 10.59% a year, compared to the annual return of the S&P 500 of -1.16%.

Balestra was named Macro Global Hedge Fund of the Year by Absolute Return Magazine in 2008. The fund bet against mortgage-backed securities using credit default swaps. In 2007, Balestra Capital's returns were 199.14%. In 2008, when the S&P 500 fell 38.49%, Balestra gave investors a 45.75% return. In 2009, it had over $1 billion in assets under management.

== Death ==
Melcher died in Manhattan, New York, on April 17, 2023, at the age of 83.

== See also ==
- List of USFA Division I National Champions
