= Bob Blum =

American sports broadcaster

Robert Blum (Oct. 1, 1920 - July 22, 2012) was an American sports broadcaster, primarily based in the West Coast.

After serving in the United States Army, Blum moved to California to work in broadcasting. He was the play-by-play voice for several teams, including the Oakland Raiders, San Francisco Giants and San Diego Chargers. Blum was a personal friend of longtime Raiders owner Al Davis after being one of three employees retained by Davis when he took over the Raiders in 1963.

After moving to Las Vegas in 1973, Blum worked as a broadcaster for the UNLV Rebels, Las Vegas Stars and other sports teams. While in Las Vegas, he worked with and coached several broadcasters, including Tim Neverett, Ken Korach, Paul Olden and Jerry Reuss. He remained a broadcaster for the UNLV Lady Rebels until his death in 2012.
