= Sigrid Rudebecks Gymnasium =

High school in Gothenburg, Sweden

Coordinates: 57°41′55″N 11°57′50″E

Information
- Established: 1869; 156 years ago
- Founder: Sigrid Rudebeck
- Enrollment: c.450
- Website: sigridrudebecks.se

Sigrid Rudebecks Gymnasium, often called Rudebecks, is a private high school that was founded as a private girl school in 1869 by the reform educator Sigrid Rudebeck, becoming coeducational in 1969. It is, along with Göteborgs Högre Samskola, one of Gothenburg's most esteemed high schools with high academic results. The school is located in central Gothenburg, on Bellmansgatan in Vasastaden, Sweden. The school has approximately 450 students.

== Notable alumni ==
- Mats Malm, Secretary of the Swedish Academy
- Jesper Brodin, CEO Ikea
- Lars Strannegård, professor
- Richard Friberg, professor
- Nicola Clase, Ambassador
- Björn Lindeblad, speaker
- Lotta Lundgren, writer
- Ester Schreiber, fencing
