= Albert Strauss =

American fencer

Personal information
- Born: August 4, 1876 New York, New York, United States
- Died: November 25, 1963 (aged 87)

Sport
- Sport: Fencing

Achievements and titles
- Highest world ranking: United States outdoor fencing champion 1921

Albert Strauss (August 4, 1876 – November 25, 1963) was an American fencer. He competed in the team sabre event at the 1924 Summer Olympics.
