= Cătălina Gheorghițoaia =

Romanian fencer (born 1975)

Personal information
- Full name: Cătălina Antonia Gheorghițoaia
- Born: 19 June 1975 (age 51) Bucharest, Romania
- Height: 1.66 m (5 ft 5 in)
- Weight: 54 kg (119 lb)

Fencing career
- Sport: Fencing
- Country: Romania
- Weapon: sabre
- Hand: left-handed
- National coach: Alexandru Chiculiță
- Club: CSA Steaua
- Retired: 2008
- FIE ranking: archive
Medal record
Women's sabre
Representing Romania
World Championships
Silver medal – second place	2001 Nîmes	Team
European Championships
Silver medal – second place	2004 Copenhagen	Team
Bronze medal – third place	2004 Copenhagen	Individual

Cătălina Gheorghițoaia (born 19 June 1975) is a Romanian sabre fencer, team silver medallist in the 2001 World Fencing Championships. She competed at the 2004 Summer Olympics, placing fourth after being defeated by Mariel Zagunis, then Sada Jacobson.
