= Columbia Lions fencing =

Fencing team for Columbia University

- First season: 1898; 128 years ago
- Athletic director: Peter Pilling
- Head coach: Michael Aufrichtig; 14th season, 627–124 (.835)
- Home stadium: Blue Gym
- Location: Manhattan, NY
- League: NCAA Division I
- Conference: Ivy League
- All-time record: 1068–503–9 (.679)
- National Titles: 22 (End of 2026 season)
- Conference titles: 55 (End of 2026 season)
- Rivalries: Harvard Crimson fencing
- All-Americans: 213
- Fight song: Roar, Lion, Roar
- Mascot: Roar-ee the Lion
- Website: GoColumbiaLions.com

The Columbia Lions fencing team is the intercollegiate fencing team for Columbia University located in Manhattan, New York City. The team competes in the Ivy League within Division I of the NCAA. The university first fielded a team in 1898, under the leadership of coach James Murray. The team is currently coached by Michael Aufrichtig.

The Blue Gym (or University Gym) is home to the Columbia Lion fencing team, located within the Dodge Physical Fitness Center on campus.

== History ==
The team was founded in 1898, and won the Intercollegiate Fencing Association national championship six times, in 1898, 1913, 1914, 1918, 1919, and 1934.

It has captured the NCAA fencing championship 16 times, most recently in 2019. This is tied with the University of Notre Dame for the most NCAA fencing titles.

The team has also won 55 Ivy League Championships, last capturing both the Men's and Women's titles outright in the same year in 2019.

The team has produced a number of Olympians, including five in 2012.

== Notable former fencers ==
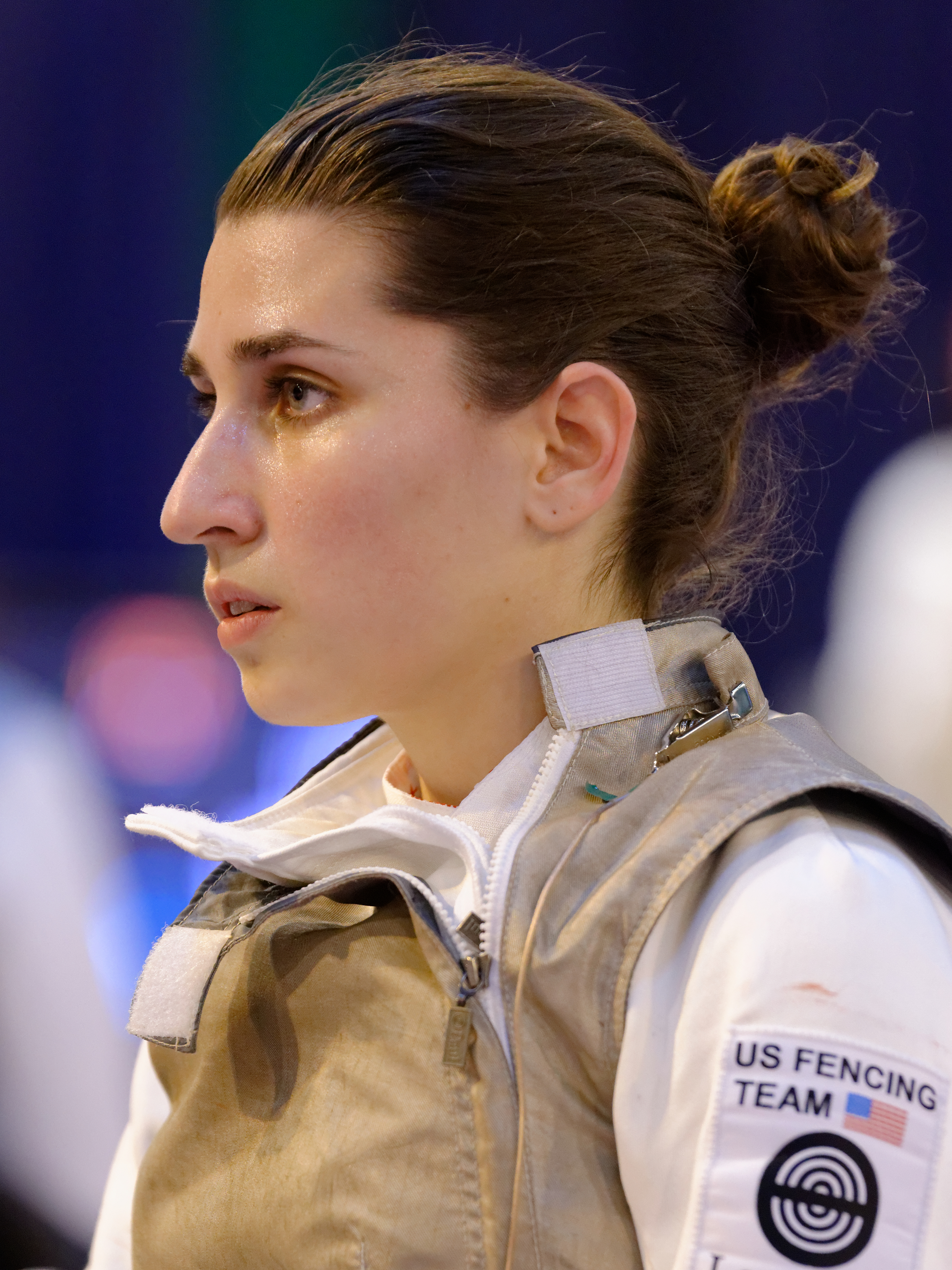
Nicole Ross

- Norman C. Armitage (born Norman Cohn; 1907-1972), 6-time Olympic fencer
- Robert Blum (born 1928), 2-time Olympic fencer
- Bob Cottingham (born 1966), Olympic fencer
- Jacqueline Dubrovich (born 1994), Olympic fencer
- Sherif Farrag (born 1987), Olympic fencer
- Joel Glucksman (born 1949), Olympic fencer
- Asher Grodman (born 1987), actor
- Alen Hadzic was named as an alternate to the 2021 Olympic team, but was suspended by the United States Center for SafeSport (SafeSport) due to findings of an investigation following allegations of rape and other sexual misconduct; an arbitrator later reduced his sanction, allowing him to go to Tokyo, though he did not fence. Hadzic had previously been suspended by Columbia University for a year for sexual misconduct, while he was a member of the Columbia team, as a result of the findings of a Title IX investigation. In June 2023, Hadzic was banned from fencing in the US for life by SafeSport, due to his sexual misconduct.
- Jacob Hoyle (born 1994), Olympic fencer
- Emily Jacobson (born 1985), Olympic fencer
- Dan Kellner (born 1976), Olympic fencer
- Stephen Kovacs (1972–2022), fencer and coach, charged with sexual assault, died in prison
- James Margolis (born 1936), Olympic fencer
- James Melcher (born 1939), Olympic fencer
- Nzingha Prescod (born 1992), Olympic fencer
- Nicole Ross (born 1989), Olympic fencer
- Hal Scardino (born 1984), American-British actor
- Daria Schneider (born 1987), saber team bronze medalist in World Fencing Championships (2011 and 2012)
- Erinn Smart (born 1980), Olympic fencer
- Jeff Spear (born 1988), Olympic fencer
- Cornel Wilde (born Kornél Weisz; 1912–1989), Hungarian-American actor
- James Leighman Williams (born 1985), Olympic fencer

== Year-by-year results ==
=== Men's fencing ===
Year	Wins	Losses	Pct.	Ivy Tournament	NCAA Tournament
2005–2006	12	5	.706	2nd	5th
2006–2007	11	2	.846	1st (Tie)	3rd
2007–2008	12	3	.800	1st	3rd
2008–2009	8	8	.500	2nd	4th
2009–2010	3	15	.167	6th	7th
2010–2011	2	13	.133	6th	7th
2011–2012	8	10	.444	3rd (Tie)	8th
2012–2013	16	8	.667	2nd (Tie)	7th
2013–2014	27	3	.900	1st (Tie)	7th
2014–2015	17	6	.739	1st (Tie)	1st
2015–2016	19	6	.684	1st (Tie)	1st
2016–2017	25	6	.760	1st (Tie)	3rd
2017–2018	20	7	.650	1st (Tie)	2nd
2018–2019				1st	1st

=== Women's fencing ===
Year	Wins	Losses	Pct.	Ivy Tournament	NCAA Tournament
2005–2006	17	3	.850	2nd	5th
2006–2007	14	0	1.000	1st	3rd
2007–2008	13	1	.929	1st	3rd
2008–2009	14	3	.824	2nd	4th
2009–2010	14	5	.737	2nd	7th
2010–2011	10	5	.667	2nd	7th
2011–2012	13	6	.684	2nd	8th
2012–2013	22	4	.846	2nd	7th
2013–2014			.846	3rd	7th
2014–2015	25	1	.961	1st	1st
2015–2016	25	2	.920	1st (Tie)	1st
2016–2017	31	2	.935	2nd	3rd
2017–2018	26	3	.885	1st	2nd
2018–2019				1st	1st
