= Emily Cross =

American fencer (born 1986)

Personal information
- Full name: Emily Ruth Cross
- Born: October 15, 1986 (age 39) Seattle, Washington, U.S.
- Spouse: Matt Allen (2018–present)

Sport
- College team: Harvard University
- Club: Metropolis Fencing Club; NY Fencers Club
- Coached by: Michael Petin
Medal record
Women's fencing
Representing United States
Olympic Games
Silver medal – second place	2008 Beijing	Foil Team

Emily Ruth Cross (born October 15, 1986) is a U.S. foil fencer who was a member of the 2008 Olympics U.S. Women's foil team. She is best known for helping the team win the foil silver medal for the U.S. at the 2008 Beijing Olympics, along with teammates Erinn Smart and Hanna Thompson.

Born in Seattle, Washington, Cross attended the Brearley School in New York City. Cross' mother was a high-school placement counselor of Korean descent. Her father Fred Cross, a professor in cell genetics, introduced Emily and her brother to Sam to fencing first at Metropolis Fencing Club and then at the NY Fencers Club. Her coach is Michael Petin.

She graduated from Harvard College (Bachelor of Arts in Biology) and the Perelman School of Medicine at the University of Pennsylvania (Doctorate of Medicine). She completed her pediatric residency and sports medicine fellowship at Boston Children's Hospital where she was a chief resident.

At Harvard she was Academic All-Ivy League in 2004–05 and 2005–06. She was also a co-recipient of the Radcliffe Prize as Harvard's top female athlete, and as its top female scholar-athlete she received the Harvard-Radcliffe Foundation for Women's Athletics Prize.

In 2001, she won a bronze medal at the USA Fencing National Championships (Division I). She won a silver medal at the 2003 Pan American Games. In 2004, she won gold medals in both the U19 Foil and U19 Epee at the USA Fencing National Championships. In 2005, she won gold medals at the Junior World Championships, NCAA Championships (Individual; the first Harvard and fifth Ivy woman to win an NCAA fencing title), and USA Fencing National Championships (both Division I and U19). In 2006, she won gold medals at the NCAA Championships (Team) and the Junior World Championships (Team). In 2007, she won a bronze medal in the Pan American Championships. In 2008, in addition to her Olympic performance, she won a gold medal at the Pan American Championships.

== Career ==
Cross competed in her first national tournament at age 11.

== Miscellaneous ==
Cross has stated that her favorite person to fence is Italian foil superstar Giovanna Trillini.

== See also ==
- List of NCAA fencing champions
- List of USFA Hall of Fame members
