= Benjamin (Benji) Ungar =

American fencer

Benjamin Ungar
Personal information
- Full name: Benjamin Nathanial Ungar
- Nickname: Benji
- Born: January 19, 1986 (age 40) Bronx, New York, U.S.
- Height: 1.80 m (5 ft 11 in)
- Weight: 75 kg (165 lb)

Sport
- Country: USA
- Sport: Fencing
- Event: Men's Epee
- College team: Harvard Crimson
- Club: New York Athletic Club
Medal record
Men's fencing
Representing United States
World Championships
Silver medal – second place	2010 Paris	Team épée
Bronze medal – third place	2006 Taebaek City	Junior men's épée
Junior and Cadet Fencing World Cup
Gold medal – first place	2006 Tauberbischofsheim	Junior men's épée
Pan American Games
Bronze medal – third place	2007 Rio de Janeiro	Team épée
NCAA Fencing Championships
Gold medal – first place	2006 Houston	Men's épée

Benjamin Nathanial Ungar (born January 19, 1986) is a US men's épée fencer. He was the NCAA men's épée champion in 2006, and was a member of the USA men's épée team that won the silver medal at the 2010 World Fencing Championships.

== Early life ==
Ungar is a native New Yorker, and has lived in The Bronx in New York. He was a child actor, with film credits in The Substance of Fire and Billy Budd. His brother, Jonathan Ungar, also fenced at Harvard ('03).

Ungar was the valedictorian of his class at Bronx High School of Science. In high school, he was a member of the National Honors Society and was a National Merit Scholarship Finalist. While a student at school, he wrote a historical paper on William Hogarth's Southwark Fair, which was published on the Internet and is still available in an updated version.

== Fencing career ==
Ungar has fenced with the New York Athletic Club. He was a member of the US National Men's Epee Team at Cadet and Junior World Championships in 2002, 2003, and 2006. He was a bronze medalist at the World Fencing Junior Championships. Ungar was the first American to win a Junior Épée World Cup, winning the Junior Men's Épée World Cup in 2006. He was also the Junior Men's Épée World Championships bronze medalist in 2006.

Fencing for Harvard University as a sophomore, Ungar was the NCAA Men's Épée Champion in 2006. His win was listed as one of Harvard's 25 greatest athletic accomplishments. He became the third Harvard men's fencer to win an NCAA individual title, and was Academic All-Ivy League. He was Harvard's Male Athlete of the Year 2006. Ungar was also a two-time All-American and two-time All-Ivy League honoree.

Ungar was a Senior Men's Épée World Championships silver medalist in 2010.

== Medical career ==
Ungar is a 2017 graduate of the Icahn School of Medicine at Mount Sinai, and a graduate from dermatology residency within the same institution in 2021. Now he serves as the director for Alopecia Center of Excellence and the director of Rosacea and Seborrheic Dermatitis Clinics at the ISMMS.

In 2011, he accepted an award for Best Basic Science Paper by the International Society for the Advancement of Spine Surgery.

== See also ==
- List of select Jewish fencers
- List of NCAA fencing champions
