= Dariya Nedashkovska =

Ukrainian fencer

Personal information
- Full name: Недашковська Дарія Юріївна
- Born: 14 October 1984 (age 41) Kalush, Ukrainian SSR, Soviet Union

Sport
- Sport: Fencing

Dariya Nedashkovska (born 14 October 1984) is a Ukrainian fencer. She competed in the women's individual sabre event at the 2004 Summer Olympics.
