= Emily Jacobson =

American fencer

Personal information
- Born: December 2, 1985 (age 40) Decatur, Georgia, United States

Sport
- Sport: Fencing
Medal record
Women's fencing
Representing United States
Pan American Games
Bronze medal – third place	2003 Dominican Republic	Individual Sabre

Emily Phillipa Jacobson (born December 2, 1985, in Decatur, Georgia) is an American Olympic sabre fencer. She won a bronze medal in the 2003 Pan American Games, and was 2004 Junior World Champion in women's saber.

== Background ==
Jacobson was born in Decatur, Georgia, and is Jewish. She is a daughter of David Jacobson, an endocrinologist who was a member of the 1974 U.S. National fencing team in saber and also a former Yale fencer, and Tina Jacobson, who has also fenced competitively. She is the younger sister of fellow U.S. Olympic team fencer Sada Jacobson, born in February 1983. She also has a younger sister, Jackie, who was born February 26, 1989, who is also a world-class fencer.

Jacobson graduated from The Westminster Schools in Atlanta, Georgia, in 2004. She attended Columbia University, where she was a psychology major, and graduated in 2008. She graduated from Georgia State University College of Law and the Georgia State University – J. Mack Robinson College of Business with a JD/MBA, in 2014.

== Fencing career ==
=== World Championships, World Cups, Pan Am Games, and US & World Rankings ===
Jacobson finished 7th in saber at the 2001 World Championships. She won a team gold medal in sabre at the 2001 World Junior Team Championships. She won a bronze medal at the 2003 Pan American Games. She won a bronze medal at a World Cup in Havana, Cuba, in June 2003, and a silver medal at a World Cup in Budapest, Hungary, in March 2004.

At the 2004 Junior World Championships, she won gold medals in both the team and individual events. That year, she was ranked No. 3 among female junior and senior U.S. saber fencers.

In 2005 she took 5th in the Junior World Championships.

In 2010, she won the National Championship in Women’s Sabre at the US Fencing National Championships.

=== Olympics ===
She competed for the U.S. at the 2004 Summer Olympics. She reached the Round of 16, losing to Leonore Perrus of France, 15-13.

=== College career ===
After high school, she ranked second nationally, and 11th in the world. At Columbia University, fencing for the Columbia Lions fencing team Jacobson she was named first team All-American all four years that she competed.

Jacobson was the 2005 NCAA Champion. She won the women’s sabre title at the 2005 North American Cup, and secured the silver medal in sabre at the IFA Championships. In 2004–05 she was 27–3 overall and ranked 3rd in the nation, and 8th in the world, in sabre that year.

In 2006, she finished second in sabre at the NCAA Championships, and placed 8th at the North American Cup. In 2007 and 2008 she was third in the NCAA Championships. She was 31–2 during the 2005–06 season. For her career, she had a record of 131-16, with a .891 winning percentage.

== Awards ==
Jacobson, who is Jewish, received the 2002 Jules D. Mazor Award as the Jewish High School Athlete of the year from the Jewish Sports Hall of Fame. In 2014, she was inducted into Columbia Athletics Hall of Fame. and in 2016 she was inducted into the USA Fencing Hall of Fame.

== Calendar ==
Her image was included in a 5766 calendar, "Jewish + Female = Athlete: Portraits of Strength from around the World", featuring Jewish women in sport, produced by the Hadassah-Brandeis Institute.

== See also ==
- List of select Jewish fencers
- List of NCAA fencing champions
- List of USFA Hall of Fame members
