= Susanne König =

German fencer

Personal information
- Born: 30 May 1974 (age 52) Satu Mare, Romania

Sport
- Sport: Fencing

Susanne König (born 30 May 1974) is a German fencer. She competed in the women's individual sabre event at the 2004 Summer Olympics.
