= Robert Blum (fencer) =

American fencer (1928–2022)

Personal information
- Full name: Robert Max Blum
- Born: November 24, 1928 Pittsburgh, Pennsylvania, U.S.
- Died: November 27, 2022 (aged 94) Rensselaerville, New York, U.S.

Sport
- Country: United States
- Sport: Fencing
- Event: sabre
- College team: Trinity College and Columbia University
- Club: Salle Santelli and the Fencers Club

Robert Max Blum (November 24, 1928 – November 27, 2022) was an American Olympic fencer.

== Early and personal life ==
Blum was born in Pittsburgh, Pennsylvania, and was Jewish. He attended Columbia Law School, and practiced law for 50 years. His wife was Barbara Blum, who became a high-ranking social services official. Blum became an aide to John Lindsay, first in Congress and then at City Hall in New York City, and later was one of New York Governor Andrew Cuomo’s NYS Assistant Attorneys General.

Blum died on November 27, 2022, at the age of 94.

== Fencing career ==
Blum attended and fenced first as an All American for Trinity College, and then for Columbia University. He also fenced for Salle Santelli and the Fencers Club in New York, winning the US Saber Team title 10 times with the two clubs, combined. He was a member of the U.S. sabre team that won the gold medal at the 1959 Pan American Games.

Blum was the first American to make the World Championship individual saber finals, when he did that at the 1958 World Fencing Championships. Blum competed on behalf of the United States in the team sabre events at the 1964 Summer Olympics in Tokyo and the 1968 Summer Olympics in Mexico City. He was inducted into the USA Fencing Hall of Fame in 2010.

== See also ==
- List of USFA Hall of Fame members
