= 2018 Harvard Crimson men's volleyball team =

American college volleyball season

2018 Harvard Crimson men's volleyball
- Conference: Eastern Intercollegiate Volleyball Association
- Record: 13-14 (10-4 EIVA)
- Head coach: Brian Baise (10th season)
- Assistant coach: Jared Goldberg (1st season)
- Home arena: Malkin Athletic Center

The 2018 Harvard Crimson men's volleyball team represented Harvard University in the 2018 NCAA Division I & II men's volleyball season. The Crimson, led by tenth year head coach Brian Biase, played their home games at Malkin Athletic Center. The Crimson were members of the Eastern Intercollegiate Volleyball Association and were picked to finish fifth in the EIVA the preseason poll.

2018 Eastern Intercollegiate Volleyball Association standings
	Conf.				Overall
Team	W		L	PCT	W		L	PCT
George Mason ‍†‍‍	13	–	1	.929	17	–	12	.586
Penn State ‍‍‍	10	–	4	.714	15	–	11	.577
Harvard ‍‍‡‍^{y}	10	–	4	.714	13	–	14	.481
Princeton ‍‍‍	7	–	7	.500	12	–	16	.429
Charleston (WV) ‍‍‍	5	–	9	.357	16	–	10	.615
NJIT ‍‍‍	5	–	9	.357	9	–	17	.346
Saint Francis ‍‍‍	4	–	10	.286	9	–	20	.310
Sacred Heart ‍‍‍	2	–	12	.143	7	–	15	.318
† – Conference champion ‡ – EIVA tournament champion y – Invited to the NCAA tournament Rankings from AVCA

== Roster ==
2018 Harvard Crimson roster
Defensive Specialist/Libero: 1 Chase Howard - Sophomore; 15 Jack Connolly - Sophomore; Setters: 2 Marko Kostich - Senior; 10 Matthew Ctvrtlik - Sophomore	Outside hitters: 3 Brad Gretsch - Senior; 4 Adam Gordon - Freshman; 5 Griffin Schmit - Freshman; 11 Erik Johnsson - Sophomore; 12 Jack Heavey - Senior	Middle blockers: 3 Brad Gretsch - Senior; 8 Trevor Dow - Junior; 9 Riley Moore - Senior; 13 Spencer Scott - Junior; 14 Kevin Zhao - Sophomore; 16 Marty Heavey - Sophomore

== Schedule ==
Date Time	Opponent	Rank	Arena City (Tournament)	Television	Score	Attendance	Record (EIVA Record)
1/19; 7 p.m.	Fort Wayne		Arnie Ball Court; Ft.Wayne, IN	Mastodon All-Access	L 1–3 (25–21, 22–25, 17–25, 19–25)	604	0–1
1/20; 7:30 p.m.	#15 Ball State		John E. Worthen Arena; Muncie, IN	Ball State All-Access	L 1–3 (22–25, 25–23, 21–25, 9–25)	1,102	0–2
1/27; 7 p.m.	Sacred Heart*		Pitt Center; Fairfield, CT	NEC Front Row	W 3–0 (25–19, 16–25, 25–15, 25–20)	111	1–2 (1–0)
1/29; 6 p.m.	Springfield		Malkin Athletic Center; Cambridge, MA	Ivy League Net	L 2–3 (25–17, 17–25, 25–22, 19–25, 15–11)	115	1–3
2/8; 7 p.m.	#1 Long Beach State		Malkin Athletic Center; Cambridge, MA	Ivy League Net	L 0–3 (15–25, 15–20, 20–25)	167	1–4
2/9; 8 p.m.	New Paltz State		Blake Arena; Springfield, MA (International Volleyball Hall of Fame Morgan Classic)		L 2–3 (25–14, 14–25, 26–24, 25–19, 12–15)	150	1–5
2/10; 6 p.m.	Stevenson		Blake Arena; Springfield, MA (International Volleyball Hall of Fame Morgan Classic)		L 1–3 (21–25, 22–25, 25–22, 21–25)	250	1–6
2/16; 8 p.m.	St. Francis*		DeGol Arena; Loretto, PA	NEC Front Row	L 1–3 (24–26, 19–25, 25–17, 19–25)	179	1–7 (1–1)
2/17; 4 p.m.	Penn State*		Rec Hall; University Park, PA	Penn State All–Access	L 0–3 (26–28, 14–25, 18–25)	520	1–8 (1–2)
2/23; 7 p.m.	Princeton*		Dillon Gym; Princeton, NJ	Ivy League DN	W 3–0 (25–22, 25–19, 25–18)	165	2–8 (2–2)
2/24; 4 p.m.	NJIT*		Wellness and Events Center; Newark, NJ	Highlanders All-Access	W 3–2 (29–27, 19–25, 20–25, 25–13, 15–8)	100	3–8 (3–2)
3/2; 7 p.m.	Charleston*		Malkin Athletic Center; Cambridge, MA	Ivy League Net	W 3–1 (25–17, 30–28, 23–25, 25–19)	146	4–8 (4–2)
3/3; 4 p.m.	Charleston*		Malkin Athletic Center; Cambridge, MA	Ivy League Net	W 3–0 (25–18, 25–15, 25–23)	132	5–8 (5–2)
3/10; 10 p.m.	#12 CSUN		Matadome; Northridge, CA	Big West TV	L 0–3 (20–25, 14–25, 23–25)	336	5–9
3/11; 10 p.m.	USC		Galen Center; Los Angeles, CA	P12+ USC	L 1–3 (20–25, 25–21, 23–25, 26–28)	250	5–10
3/12; 10 p.m.	Concordia Irvine		CU Arena; Irvine, CA	CIU on Stretch	L 1–3 (13–25, 25–15, 21–25, 19–25)	225	5–11
3/23; 7 p.m.	Sacred Heart*		Malkin Athletic Center; Cambridge, MA	Ivy League Net	W 3–1 (24–26, 25–22, 25–17, 25–21)	146	6–11 (6–2)
3/24; 7 p.m.	Alderson Broaddus		Malkin Athletic Center; Cambridge, MA	Ivy League Net	W 3–0 (25–8, 25–14, 26–24)	102	7–11
3/30; 7 p.m.	St. Francis*		Malkin Athletic Center; Cambridge, MA	Ivy League Net	W 3–1 (25–15, 25–19, 15–25, 25–15)	123	8–11 (7–2)
3/31; 7 p.m.	Penn State*		Malkin Athletic Center; Cambridge, MA	Ivy League Net	W 3–2 (25–13, 32–30, 25–27, 16–25, 15–12)	354	9–11 (8–2)
4/6; 7 p.m.	Princeton*		Malkin Athletic Center; Cambridge, MA	Ivy League Net	W 3–2 (25–15, 25–21, 18–25, 19–25, 15–13)	200	10–11 (9–2)
4/7; 7 p.m.	NJIT*		Malkin Athletic Center; Cambridge, MA	Ivy League Net	W 3–0 (25–21, 25–19, 25–15)	101	11–11 (10–2)
4/13; 7 p.m.	George Mason*		Recreation and Athletic Complex; Fairfax, VA	George Mason All-Access	L 2–3 (22–25, 29–27, 27–25, 25–27, 11–15)	277	11–12 (10–3)
4/14; 3 p.m.	George Mason*		Recreation and Athletic Complex; Fairfax, VA	George Mason All-Access	L 1–3 (25–18, 17–25, 20–25, 19–25)	200	11–13 (10–4)
4/19; 5 p.m.	Penn State*		Recreation and Athletic Complex; Fairfax, VA (EIVA Semifinal)	FloVolleyball	W 3–2 (25–18, 21–25, 25–19, 18–25, 15–11)	1,005	12–13
4/21; 7 p.m.	Princeton*		Recreation and Athletic Complex; Fairfax, VA (EIVA Championship)	FloVolleyball	W 3–1 (25–20, 26–24, 17–25, 25–23)	143	13–13
5/1; 10:30 p.m.	UCLA		Pauley Pavilion; Los Angeles, CA (NCAA Quarterfinal)	P12+ UCLA	L 1–3(25–23, 21–25, 11–25, 21–25)	1,691	13–14

*-Indicates conference match.
Times listed are Eastern Time Zone.
