= Harvard Crimson =

Intercollegiate athletic teams of Harvard University

- University: Harvard University
- Nickname: Crimson
- NCAA: Division I (FCS)
- Conference: Ivy League (primary); ECAC Hockey; EIWA (wrestling); NEISA (sailing); EISA (skiing); CSA (squash); CWPA (women's water polo); NWPC (men's water polo)
- Athletic director: Erin McDermott
- Location: Boston, Massachusetts (Note: Harvard's overall administration is located in Cambridge, Massachusetts, but its main athletic department office and almost all of its athletic facilities lie within the Boston city limits. The Malkin Athletic Center (fencing, volleyball, wrestling) and Weld Boathouse (women's rowing) are located in Cambridge.)
- Varsity teams: 42 teams
- Football stadium: Harvard Stadium
- Basketball arena: Lavietes Pavilion
- Ice hockey arena: Bright-Landry Hockey Center
- Baseball stadium: Joseph J. O'Donnell Field
- Softball stadium: Soldiers Field
- Soccer stadium: Jordan Field, Ohiri Field
- Lacrosse stadium: Harvard Stadium
- Rowing venue: Newell Boathouse, Weld Boathouse
- Sailing venue: Harvard Sailing Center
- Volleyball arena: Malkin Athletic Center
- Colors: Crimson, white, and black
- Mascot: Harvard Turkey (unofficial)
- Fight song: "Ten Thousand Men of Harvard"
- Website: gocrimson.com
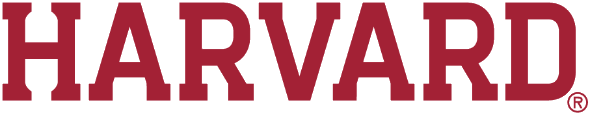

The Harvard Crimson is the nickname of the college sports teams of Harvard University. The school's teams compete in NCAA Division I. As of 2013, there were 42 Division I intercollegiate varsity sports teams for women and men at Harvard, more than at any other NCAA Division I college in the country. Like the other Ivy League colleges, Harvard does not offer athletic scholarships.

Athletics at Harvard began in 1780 when the sophomores challenged the freshmen to a wrestling tournament with the losers buying dinner. Since its historic boat race against archrival Yale in 1852, Harvard has been in the forefront of American intercollegiate sports. Its football team conceived the modern version of the game and devised essentials ranging from the first concrete stadium to a scoreboard to uniform numbers to signals. Originally inspired by varsity matches between Oxford University and Cambridge University in England, Harvard and Yale influenced the development of college athletics in the United States.

== Sports sponsored ==
| Men's sports | Women's sports |
|---|---|
| Baseball | Softball |
| Basketball | Basketball |
| | Cross country |
| Cross country | Field hockey |
| Football | Golf |
| Golf | Ice hockey |
| Ice hockey | Lacrosse |
| Lacrosse | Rowing^{1} |
| Rowing^{1} | Rugby |
| Rugby (club) | Soccer |
| Soccer | Squash |
| Squash | Swimming and diving |
| Swimming and diving | Tennis |
| Tennis | Track and field^{†} |
| Track and field^{2} | Volleyball |
| Volleyball | Water polo |
| Water polo | |
| Wrestling | |
Co-ed sports
Fencing
Sailing
Skiing
^{1} – includes both lightweight and heavyweight^{2} – includes both indoor and outdoor

=== Baseball ===
Harvard's baseball program began competing in the 1865 season. It has appeared in four College World Series. It plays at Joseph J. O'Donnell Field and is currently coached by Bill Decker.

=== Basketball ===
==== Men's basketball ====
Harvard has an intercollegiate men's basketball program. The team currently competes in the Ivy League in Division I of the National Collegiate Athletic Association (NCAA) and play home games at the Lavietes Pavilion in Boston. The team's last appearance in the NCAA Division I men's basketball tournament was in 2014, where they beat Cincinnati in the Round of 64 in a 12 vs. 5 seed upset. The Crimson are currently coached by Tommy Amaker.

==== Women's basketball ====
Harvard has an intercollegiate women's basketball program. The team currently competes in the Ivy League in Division I of the National Collegiate Athletic Association (NCAA) and play home games at the Lavietes Pavilion in Boston. The team's last appearance in the NCAA Division I women's basketball tournament was in 2007.

=== Fencing ===
The fencing team won the 2006 NCAA team championship in men's and women's combined fencing. Representing Harvard Crimson, Benjamin (Benji) Ungar won Gold in the 2006 Individual Men's Épée event at the NCAA Fencing Championship, and was named Harvard Athlete of The Year. In 2020, the fencing program received more attention following a student admission scandal which involved former fencing coach Peter Brand accepting bribes to admit at least two sons of Maryland businessman Jie “Jack” Zhao into Harvard as members of the fencing team.

=== Football ===
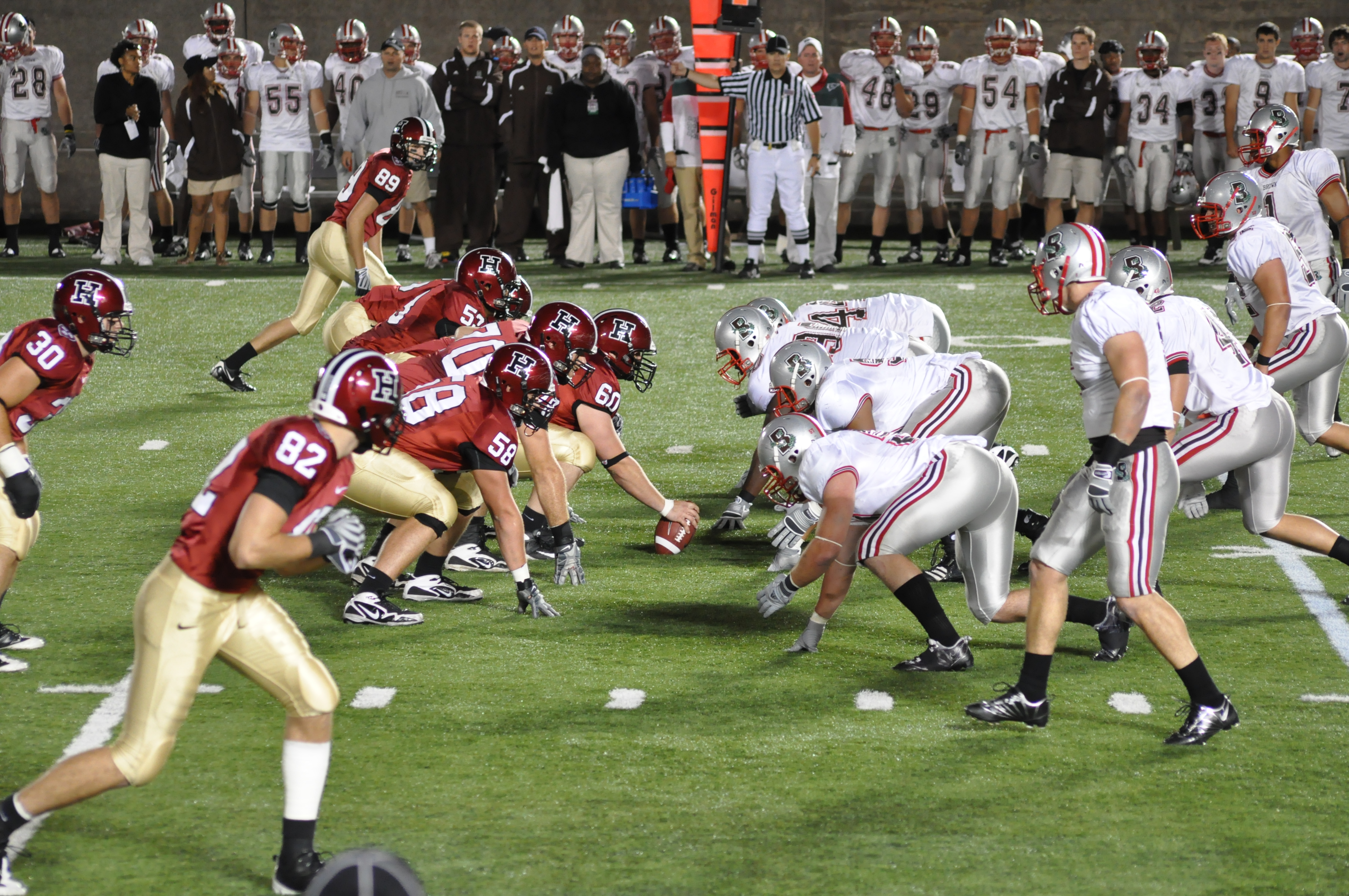
Harvard football taking on Brown at Harvard Stadium in September 2009

The football team has competed since 1873, initially using rugby union rules through 1882. They have won ten national championships when the school competed in what is now known as the FBS. They are perhaps best known for their rivalry with Yale, known as "The Game". Sixteen former players have been inducted into the College Football Hall of Fame.

Harvard's athletic rivalry with Yale is intense in every sport in which they meet, coming to a climax each fall in their annual football meeting, which dates back to 1875. While Harvard's football team is no longer one of the country's best as it often was a century ago during football's early days (it won the Rose Bowl in 1920), both it and Yale have influenced the way the game is played. In 1903, Harvard Stadium introduced a new era into football with the first-ever permanent reinforced concrete stadium of its kind in the country. The stadium's structure actually played a role in the evolution of the college game. Seeking to reduce the alarming number of deaths and serious injuries in the sport, the "Father of Football", Walter Camp (former captain of the Yale football team), suggested widening the field to open up the game. But the state-of-the-art Harvard Stadium was too narrow to accommodate a wider playing surface. So, other steps had to be taken. Camp would instead support revolutionary new rules for the 1906 season. These included legalizing the forward pass, perhaps the most significant rule change in the sport's history.

In both 1919 and 1920, headed by All-American brothers Arnold Horween and Ralph Horween, Harvard was undefeated (9–0–1, as they outscored their competition 229–19, and 8–0–1, respectively). The team won the 1920 Rose Bowl 7–6 over the University of Oregon. It was the only bowl appearance in Harvard history.

=== Golf ===
Harvard has won six national collegiate team championships: 1898 (fall), 1899, 1901, 1902 (fall), 1903, and 1904. They have crowned eight individual national champions: James Curtis (1898, fall), Halstead Lindsley (1901), Chandler Egan (1902, fall), A. L. White (1904), H. H. Wilder (1908), F. C. Davison (1912), Edward Allis (1914), J. W. Hubbell (1916). They won the inaugural Ivy League championship in 1975, and again in 2016, 2017, and 2026.

=== Ice hockey ===
==== Men's ice hockey ====
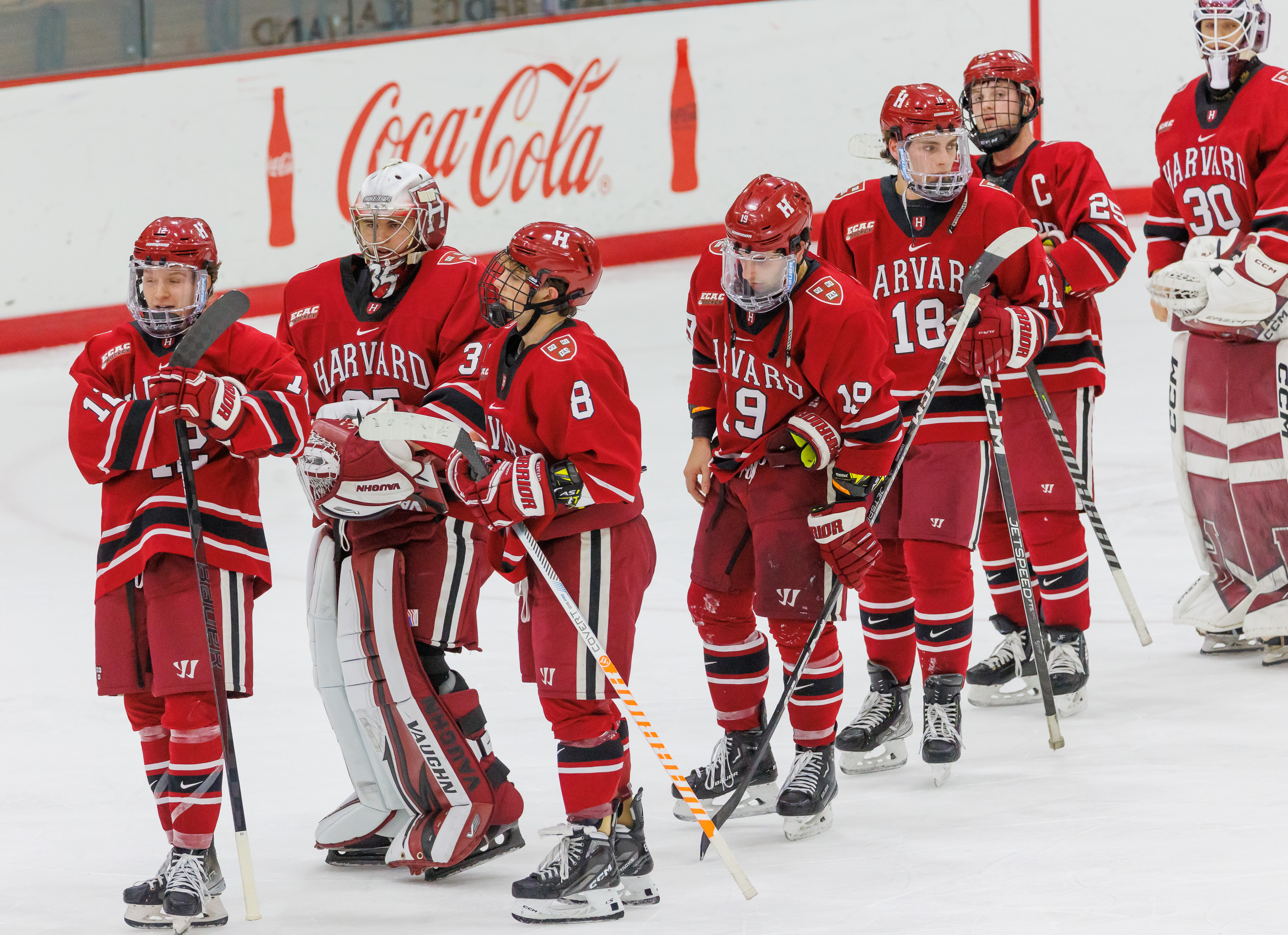
Harvard men's ice hockey team in 2023

The men's ice hockey team is one of the oldest intercollegiate ice hockey teams in the United States, having played their first game on January 19, 1898, in a 0–6 loss to Brown. Former head coach William H. Claflin and former captain George Owen are credited with the first use of line change in a game against Yale on March 3, 1923, when the Crimson substituted entire forward lines instead of individuals. The men's ice hockey team won the NCAA Division I Championship on April 1, 1989, defeating the Minnesota Golden Gophers 4–3 in overtime. The Cleary Cup, awarded to the ECAC regular-season champion, is named for former Harvard All-American hockey player, coach, and athletic director Bill Cleary, a member of the U.S. hockey team that won the 1960 Winter Olympics gold medal. The team competes in ECAC Hockey along with five other Ivy League schools and is coached by Harvard alumnus, Olympian, and former NHL forward, Ted Donato. Harvard competes in one of the most heated rivalries of college hockey at least twice each season against Harvard's archrival, the Cornell Big Red, in installments of the Cornell–Harvard hockey rivalry. Cornell and Harvard are the most storied programs currently in the ECAC.

- 1-time NCAA men's champions: 1989
- 10-time ECAC men's champions: 1963, 1971, 1983, 1987, 1994, 2002, 2004, 2006, 2015, 2017
- 11-time ECAC men's regular-season champions: 1963, 1973*, 1975, 1986, 1987, 1988*, 1989, 1992, 1993, 1994, 2017* (*denotes tie)

==== Women's ice hockey ====
- 1-time women's national champions (1999, crowned by AWCHA, pre-dated NCAA Women's "Frozen Four")
- 6-time ECAC women's champions (1999, 2004–06, 2008, 2015)
- 6-time ECAC women's regular-season champions (1999, 2003–05, 2008, 2015)

=== Rowing ===
See footnote.

- ECAC Rowing Trophy: 2002, 2004

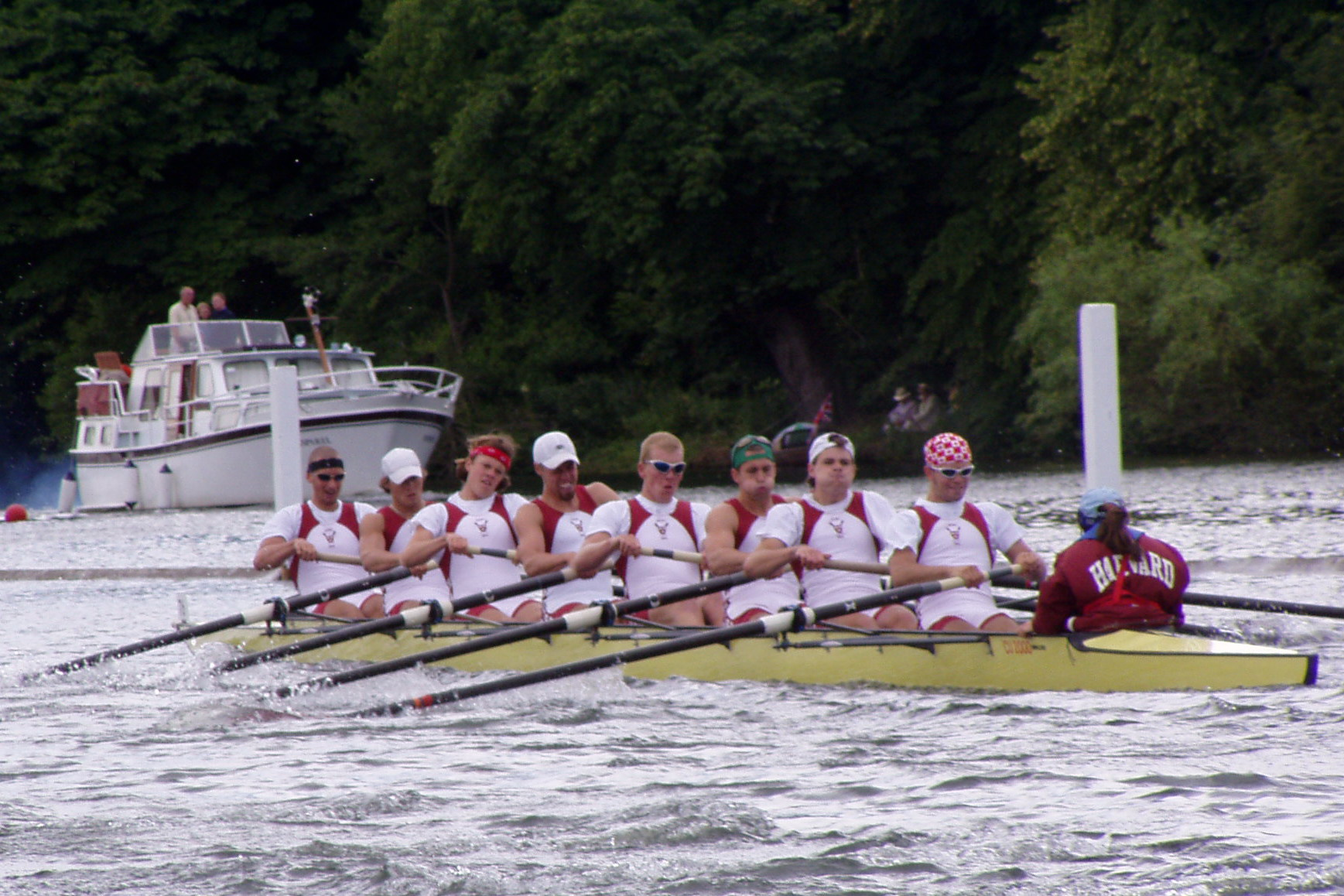
Harvard men's eight at Henley, 2004

Older than The Game by 23 years, the Harvard–Yale Regatta was the original source of the athletic rivalry between the two schools. It is held annually in June on the Thames river in eastern Connecticut. Both the Harvard heavyweight and lightweight teams are typically considered to be among the top teams in the country in rowing, having won numerous national championships in recent years.

For a time the Harvard lightweight men's team had one of the "oddest" streaks in collegiate sports, having won the national championships in every odd year from 1989 to 2003 (and in no corresponding even years). The streak was broken when Harvard lost to Yale by almost 4 seconds in 2005.

The women's heavyweight rowing team were NCAA Champions in 2003.

==== Honors ====
- Henley Royal Regatta, Grand Challenge Cup 1914, 1939, 1950, 1959, 1985
- Henley Royal Regatta, Ladies' Challenge Plate 1973, 1983, 1990, 1998, 2002, 2007, 2010, 2012
- Henley Royal Regatta, Thames Challenge Cup 1958, 1959, 1960, 1966, 1971, 1972, 1976
- Henley Royal Regatta, Temple Challenge Cup 2001, 2002, 2025
- Henley Royal Regatta, Britannia Challenge Cup 1993, 2002
- Henley Royal Regatta, Prince Albert Challenge Cup 2011, 2019
- Henley Royal Regatta, Wyfold Challenge Cup 1971
- Henley Royal Regatta, Visitors' Challenge Cup 2013, 2014

=== Polo ===
The Polo Club was founded in 1883, and has gone through periods of dormancy. Since 2006, the club has been continuously active and competes in the international Atlantic Cup.

=== Rugby ===
Harvard added women's rugby as a varsity sport in 2013, increasing the number of sports the school offered to 42. Collegiate women's rugby programs are governed by the National Intercollegiate Rugby Association. Harvard was the first Ivy League institution to sponsor a varsity rugby program. Prior to 2013, the Harvard Radcliffe Rugby Football Club, which began in 1982, had won two national championships (1998, 2011) as a club team. Notable honors include: 2019 National Intercollegiate Rugby Association (NIRA) National Champions, Ivy League Champions (2018, 2013), Ivy League Sevens Champions (2016, 2017, 2019)

=== Sailing ===
The Harvard team won the Leonard M. Fowle Trophy in 2001, 2002, 2003, 2004 and 2005, and the dinghies Intercollegiate Sailing Association National Championships in 1952, 1953, 1959, 1974 and 2003, the women's dinghies in 2005, the sloops in 2001 and 2002, and the team race in 2002 and 2003. The team was ranked 11th nationally in 2013 according to Sailing World.

=== Soccer ===
==== Men's soccer ====
Before the NCAA began its tournament in 1959, the annual national champion was declared by the Intercollegiate Association Football League (IAFL) — from 1911 to 1926 — and then the Intercollegiate Soccer Football Association (ISFA), from 1927 to 1958. From 1911 to 1958, Harvard won four national championships.

==== Women's soccer ====
Women's soccer was elevated from a club to a varsity sport at Harvard in 1977. Bob Scalise, Harvard's former athletic director, was the first head coach. The team has won thirteen Ivy League Championships: 1978, 1979, 1981, 1995, 1996, 1997, 1999, 2008, 2009, 2011, 2013, 2014, and 2016.

=== Squash ===
==== Women's squash ====
- 22 national titles (9 consecutively 2015–2023)
- 28 Ivy League titles (9 consecutively 2017–2025)

==== Men's squash ====
- 40 national titles
- 41 Ivy League titles
- 2014 national champions

=== Swimming and diving ===
Harvard Swimming and Diving was founded in 1902^{30}. Harvard Men's Swimming and Diving is currently coached by Kevin Tyrrell, Harvard Women's Swimming and Diving is currently coached by Stephanie Wriede Morawski.

=== Tennis ===
Michael Zimmerman played tennis for the Harvard tennis team, and was a member of four successive Ivy League championship winning teams, from 1989 to 1992. In both 1991 and 1992 he earned Ivy League Player of the Year and ITA All-American honors.

=== Track & field ===
Harvard has men's and women's teams in track & field in Indoor, Outdoor (Men, Women), and Cross-Country. Among its notable athletes have been Bill Meanix, who held the world record in the 440 yd hurdles, and Milton Green, a world record holder in high hurdles.

=== Volleyball ===
==== Men's volleyball ====
Inaugural season for the men's team was 1981. The Crimson compete in the Eastern Intercollegiate Volleyball Association (EIVA) and are under the direction of head coach, Brian Baise.

==== Women's volleyball ====
Inaugural season for the women's team was 1981. The Crimson compete in the Ivy League and are under the direction of head coach, Jennifer Weiss.

=== Water polo ===
Coach Ted Minnis heads both the Men's and Women's Water Polo teams, which compete in the Collegiate Water Polo Association. The teams both play in Blodgett Pool.

=== Wrestling ===
First established in 1913, the Harvard wrestling team celebrated its 100th anniversary in 2013–14, making the Crimson one of the oldest collegiate wrestling programs in the nation. As part of that celebration GoCrimson.com released the "Top Moments in Harvard Wrestling History" in collaboration with the Harvard Crimson Wrestling team. The team practices and competes in the Malkin Athletic Center. In 1938, the Harvard Wrestling team featured the program's first national champion, John Harkness.

Jesse Jantzen ’04 is the most accomplished wrestler in Harvard history with the record for all-time wins (132), winning percentage (.910), and pins (50), Jantzen's accomplishments include: 2004 NCAA Champion, 2004 NCAA Most Outstanding Wrestler, three-time NCAA All-American, three-time EIWA Champion, and four-time NCAA Qualifier.

== Spirit groups ==
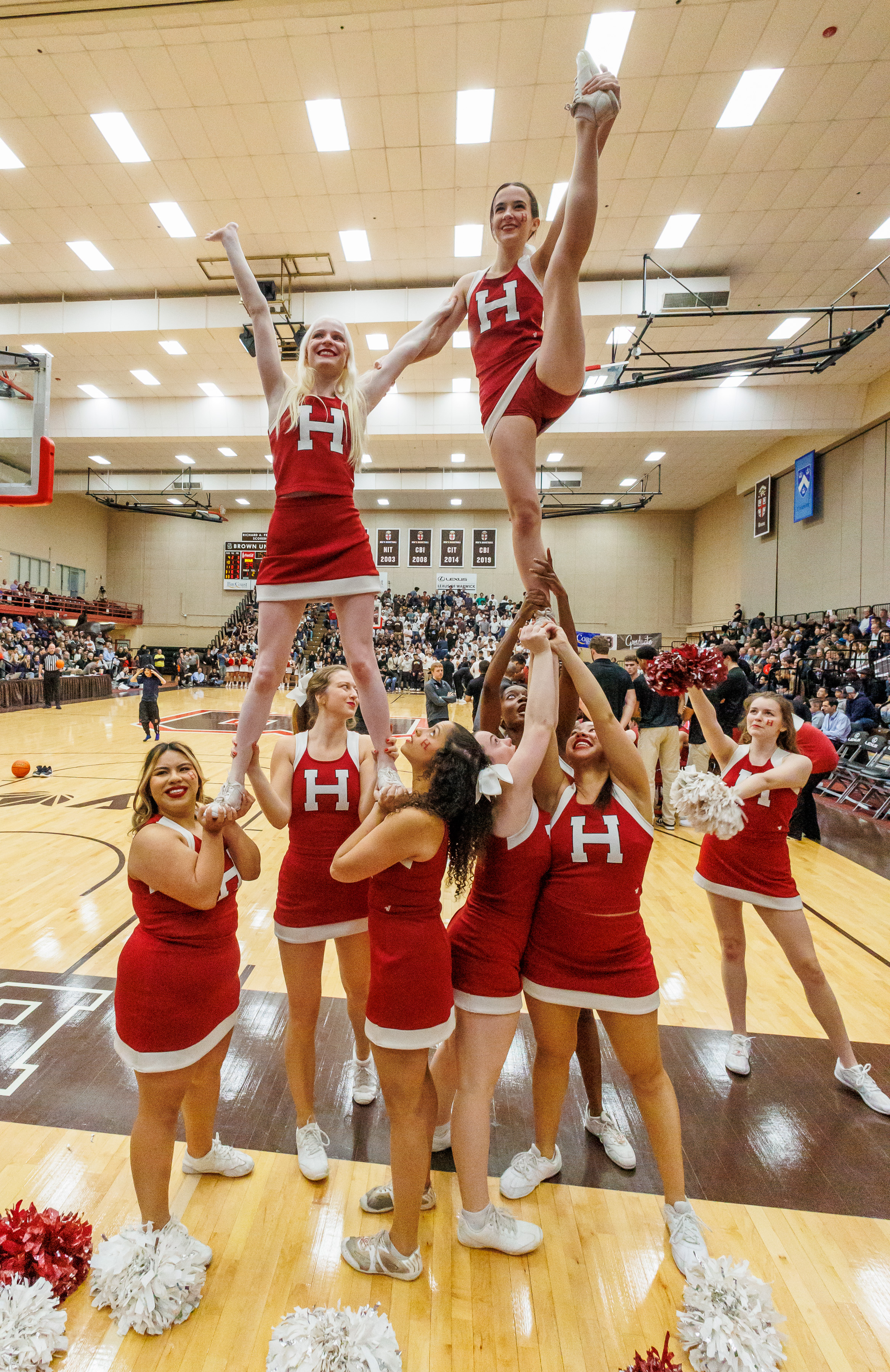
Cheerleaders at a basketball game.

Harvard athletic contests are supported by campus spirit groups including the Harvard University Band, the Crimson Dance Team, and Harvard Cheerleading.

- The beginnings of Harvard Cheerleading likely predate football at the University, and may originate in the mid or late nineteenth century. The program boasts of U.S. President Franklin D. Roosevelt (1904) and journalist John Reed (1910) as alumni; the squad was exclusively male until 1971.
- The student-run Harvard University Band was established in 1919 and was the world's first university "scramble" band.
- The Harvard Crimson Dance Team was established in 1995 and competes at both a regional and national level.
- During the 2022 Harvard-Yale football game, students debuted the Harvard Turkey as the school's first unofficial mascot. A majority vote by the student body and unanimous decision of the Harvard Undergraduate Association approved the acquisition of a permanent suit in fall of 2023.

== Awards ==
- Nils V. "Swede" Nelson Award, college football award named for former player

== Facilities ==
Harvard has several athletic facilities, such as the Lavietes Pavilion, a multi-purpose arena and home to the basketball teams. The Malkin Athletic Center, known as the "MAC," serves both as the university's primary recreation facility and as home to the varsity men's and women's volleyball, men's and women's fencing, and wrestling teams. The five-story building includes two cardio rooms, a deep 25-yard swimming pool, a smaller pool for aquaerobics and other activities, a mezzanine, where all types of classes are held at all hours of the day, and an indoor cycling studio, three weight rooms, and a three-court gym floor to play basketball. The MAC also offers personal trainers and specialty classes. The MAC is also home to volleyball, fencing, and wrestling. The offices of several of the school's varsity coaches are also in the MAC.

Weld Boathouse and Newell Boathouse house the women's and men's rowing teams, respectively. The men's heavyweight team also uses the Red Top complex in Ledyard, CT, as their training camp for the annual Harvard–Yale Regatta. The Bright Hockey Center hosts the ice hockey teams, and the Murr Center serves both as a home for the squash and tennis teams as well as a strength and conditioning center for all athletic sports.

Other facilities include: Joseph J. O'Donnell Field (baseball), Harvard Stadium (football), Cumnock Turf and Harvard Stadium (lacrosse), Jordan Field and Ohiri Field (soccer), Blodgett Pool, Olympic-size (swimming and diving, water polo), and Roberto A. Mignone Field (rugby).

== Television footage ==
Harvard Undergraduate Television has footage from historical games and athletic events including the 2005 pep-rally before the Harvard-Yale Game. Harvard's official athletics website has more comprehensive information about Harvard's athletic facilities.
