= 2018 Eastern Intercollegiate Volleyball Association tournament =

2018 Eastern Intercollegiate Volleyball Association standings
	Conf.				Overall
Team	W		L	PCT	W		L	PCT
George Mason ‍†‍‍	13	–	1	.929	17	–	12	.586
Penn State ‍‍‍	10	–	4	.714	15	–	11	.577
Harvard ‍‍‡‍^{y}	10	–	4	.714	13	–	14	.481
Princeton ‍‍‍	7	–	7	.500	12	–	16	.429
Charleston (WV) ‍‍‍	5	–	9	.357	16	–	10	.615
NJIT ‍‍‍	5	–	9	.357	9	–	17	.346
Saint Francis ‍‍‍	4	–	10	.286	9	–	20	.310
Sacred Heart ‍‍‍	2	–	12	.143	7	–	15	.318
† – Conference champion ‡ – EIVA tournament champion y – Invited to the NCAA tournament Rankings from AVCA

The 2018 Eastern Intercollegiate Volleyball Association Tournament is the men's volleyball tournament for the Eastern Intercollegiate Volleyball Association during the 2018 NCAA Division I & II men's volleyball season. It is being from April 19 through April 21, 2018 at George Mason University's Recreation and Athletic Complex. The winner receives The Association's automatic bid to the 2018 NCAA Volleyball Tournament. Harvard won the tournament by beating Princeton in the championship game.

== Seeds ==
The top four teams qualify for the tournament, with the highest seed hosting each round. Teams were seeded by record within the conference, with a tiebreaker system to seed teams with identical conference records.

Seed	School	Conference	Tiebreaker
1	George Mason	13–1	–
2	Penn State	10–4	Went 1–1 vs. Harvard but won in fewer sets (3–0)
3	Harvard	10–4	Went 1–1 vs. Penn State but more in more sets (3–2)
4	Princeton	7–7	–
5	NJIT	5–9	2–0 vs. Charleston, Did not qualify
6	Charleston	5–9	0–2 vs. NJIT, Did not qualify
7	St. Francis	4–10	Did not qualify
8	Sacred Heart	2–12	Did not qualify

== Schedule and results ==
Time Network	Matchup	Score	Attendance	Broadcasters
Semifinals – Thursday, April 19
5:00 pm FloVolleyball	No. 2 Penn State vs. No. 3 Harvard	2–3 (18–25, 25–21, 19–25, 25–18, 11–15)	1,005	Tyler Hyrum & Zach Hamilton
7:30 pm FloVolleyball	No. 1 George Mason vs. No. 4 Princeton	1–3 (17–25, 25–22, 23–25, 20–25)	1,005	Tyler Hyrum & Zach Hamilton
Championship – Saturday, April 21
7:00 pm FloVolleyball	No. 3 Harvard vs. No. 4 Princeton	3–1 (25–20, 26–24, 17–25, 25–23)	143	Tyler Hyrum & Zach Hamilton
Game times are ET. Rankings denote tournament seeding.

== Bracket ==
Quarterfinals; Thursday, April 19
1	George Mason	1
4	Princeton	3
2	Penn State	2
3	Harvard	3

Championship; Saturday, April 21
4	Princeton	1
3	Harvard	3
