= 2018 Mountain Pacific Sports Federation men's volleyball tournament =

2018 Mountain Pacific Sports Federation volleyball season

2018 Mountain Pacific Sports Federation Men's Volleyball Tournament
- Classification: Division I/II
- Teams: 7
- Site: Smith Fieldhouse; Provo, UT
- Champions: BYU (7th title)
- Winning coach: Shawn Olmstead (2nd title)
- MVP: Brenden Sander (BYU)
- Attendance: 3,017
- Television: BYUtv, SportsLive
- Mountain Pacific Sports Federation Men's Volleyball Tournaments

2018 Mountain Pacific Sports Federation volleyball standings
	Conf.				Overall
Team	W		L	PCT	W		L	PCT
No. 2 BYU ‍†‍‡‍^{y}	10	–	2	.833	22	–	7	.759
No. 3 UCLA ‍‍‍^{y}	9	–	3	.750	26	–	8	.765
No. 8 Pepperdine ‍‍‍	8	–	4	.667	15	–	8	.652
No. 13 Concordia Irvine ‍‍‍	5	–	7	.417	16	–	15	.516
No. 14 Grand Canyon ‍‍‍	4	–	8	.333	18	–	11	.621
USC ‍‍‍	3	–	9	.250	8	–	20	.286
Stanford ‍‍‍	3	–	9	.250	6	–	20	.231
† – Conference champion ‡ – 2018 MPSF Tournament champion y- Invited to the NCAA Volleyball Tournament; As of May 5, 2018; Rankings from AVCA

The 2018 Mountain Pacific Sports Federation Volleyball Tournament was a postseason men's volleyball tournament for the Mountain Pacific Sports Federation during the 2018 NCAA Division I & II men's volleyball season. It was held from April 14 through April 21, 2018 at campus sites. The winner received The Federation's automatic bid to the 2018 NCAA Volleyball Tournament.

== Seeds ==
All seven teams were eligible for the postseason, with the #1 seed receiving a bye to the semifinals and home court hosting rights for the semifinals and championship. Teams were seeded by record within the conference, with a tiebreaker system to seed teams with identical conference records. The #1 seed played the lowest remaining seed in the semifinals.

Seed	School	Conference	Tiebreaker
1	BYU	10–2	–
2	UCLA	9–3	–
3	Pepperdine	8–4	–
4	Concordia Irvine	5–7	–
5	Grand Canyon	4–8	–
6	USC	3–9	USC 2–0 vs. Stanford
7	Stanford	3–9	Stanford 0–2 vs. USC

== Schedule and results ==
Time Network	Matchup	Score	Attendance	Broadcasters
Quarterfinals – Saturday, April 14
7:00 pm Sports Live	No. 2 UCLA vs. No. 7 Stanford	3–0 (25–19, 25–15, 25–18)	836	No commentary
7:00 pm Sports Live	No. 3 Pepperdine vs. No. 6 USC	3–1 (25–22, 19–25, 26–24, 25–18)	1,027	Al Epstein
7:00 pm Sports Live	No. 4 Concordia Irvine vs. No. 5 Grand Canyon	3–0 (25–20, 25–21, 25–23)	600	Jon O'Neill
Semifinals – Thursday, April 19
4:30 pm Sports Live	No. 2 UCLA vs. No. 4 Concordia Irvine	3–1 (26–28, 25–21, 26–24, 25–18)	440	Robbie Bullough
7:00 pm BYUtv/Sports Live	No. 1 BYU vs. No. 6 USC	3–0 (25–17, 25–17, 25–22)	2,071	Jarom Jordan, Steve Vail, & Lauren McClain
Championship – Saturday, April 21
7:00 pm BYUtv/Sports Live	No. 1 BYU vs. No. 2 UCLA	3–1 (17–25, 25–21, 25–18, 25–21)	3,017	Jarom Jordan, Steve Vail, & Lauren McClain
Game times are PT for the quarterfinals and MT for the semifinals and championship. Rankings denote tournament seeding.

== Bracket ==
Quarterfinals; Saturday, April 14
1	BYU
(bye)
3	Pepperdine	1
6	USC	3
(Pairings are reseeded after the first round)
2	UCLA	3
7	Stanford	0
4	Concordia Irvine	3
5	Grand Canyon	0

Semifinals; Thursday, April 19; Smith Fieldhouse; Provo, UT
1	BYU	3
6	USC	0
2	UCLA	3
4	Concordia Irvine	1

Championship; Saturday, April 21; Smith Fieldhouse; Provo, UT
1	BYU	3
2	UCLA	1
