= Ilona Maher =

American rugby player (born 1996)

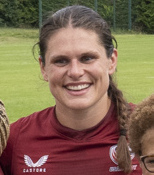
- Maher at the 2024 Summer Olympics
- Full name: Ilona Delsing Rosa Maher
- Born: August 12, 1996 (age 30) Burlington, Vermont, U.S.
- Height: 5 ft 10 in (178 cm)
- Weight: 198 lb (90 kg)
- University: Quinnipiac University

Rugby union career
- Position(s): Center, Prop (7s)
- Current team: USA Eagles
Senior career
Years	Team	Apps	(Points)
2025	Bristol Bears	8	(15)
- Correct as of January 12, 2025
International career
Years	Team	Apps	(Points)
2025–	United States	10	(0)
National sevens team
Years	Team		Comps
2018–	United States 7s		
Medal record
Women's rugby sevens
Representing United States
Olympic Games
Bronze medal – third place	2024 Paris	Team competition

Ilona Delsing Rosa Maher (/ɪˈloʊnə ˈmɑːr/ il-OH-nə MAR; born August 12, 1996) is an American professional rugby union player. She is also active as an online personality and is known for her body positivity advocacy.

Maher took up rugby at age 17, and went on to win three National Intercollegiate Rugby Association championships as a college player at Quinnipiac University. After debuting in 2018, she represented the US national rugby sevens team at the 2020 Tokyo Olympics and 2024 Paris Olympics, where she won bronze. In December 2024, she signed for three months to play with the Bristol Bears in the UK's Premiership Women's Rugby league. She began playing for them in January 2025.

== Early life and education ==
Maher was born on August 12, 1996, in Burlington, Vermont, to Michael and Mieneke Maher. Her mother is a Dutch nurse. Her father, who has Irish ancestry, is a former rugby union player who previously played for Saint Michael's College. She has two sisters: Olivia and Adrianna.

Maher and her sisters started playing "high-level" sports such as field hockey, basketball and Little League softball at a young age. During the spring of her senior year at Burlington High School, Maher grew tired of softball and was encouraged by her father to play rugby union. She attended Norwich University for one year before transferring to Quinnipiac University, where she graduated in 2018 with a bachelor's degree in nursing. She later received a master's degree in business administration from DeVry University.

== Rugby union career ==
=== 2014–2018: High school and collegiate ===
Maher began playing rugby union for the South Burlington School Rugby Football Club at the age of 17 in the spring of her senior year. She had previously played field hockey, basketball, and softball at Burlington High School, and was encouraged to try rugby union by her father, who played for Saint Michael's College.

Maher was recruited to play rugby union as a nursing student during her first and only year at Norwich University. She was then recruited to join the Quinnipiac Bobcats after Quinnipiac coach Becky Carlson observed her during a match between the two schools. After transferring to Quinnipiac, Maher played center and won three National Intercollegiate Rugby Association championships. She was named to the All-American team all three years and received the MA Sorensen Award, given to the nation's top collegiate women's rugby union player, in 2017. She was nominated for the award again after her senior season in 2018 and was named the Most Outstanding Player at the National Intercollegiate Rugby Association Championships that year.

=== 2018–2024: National rugby sevens team and Olympics ===
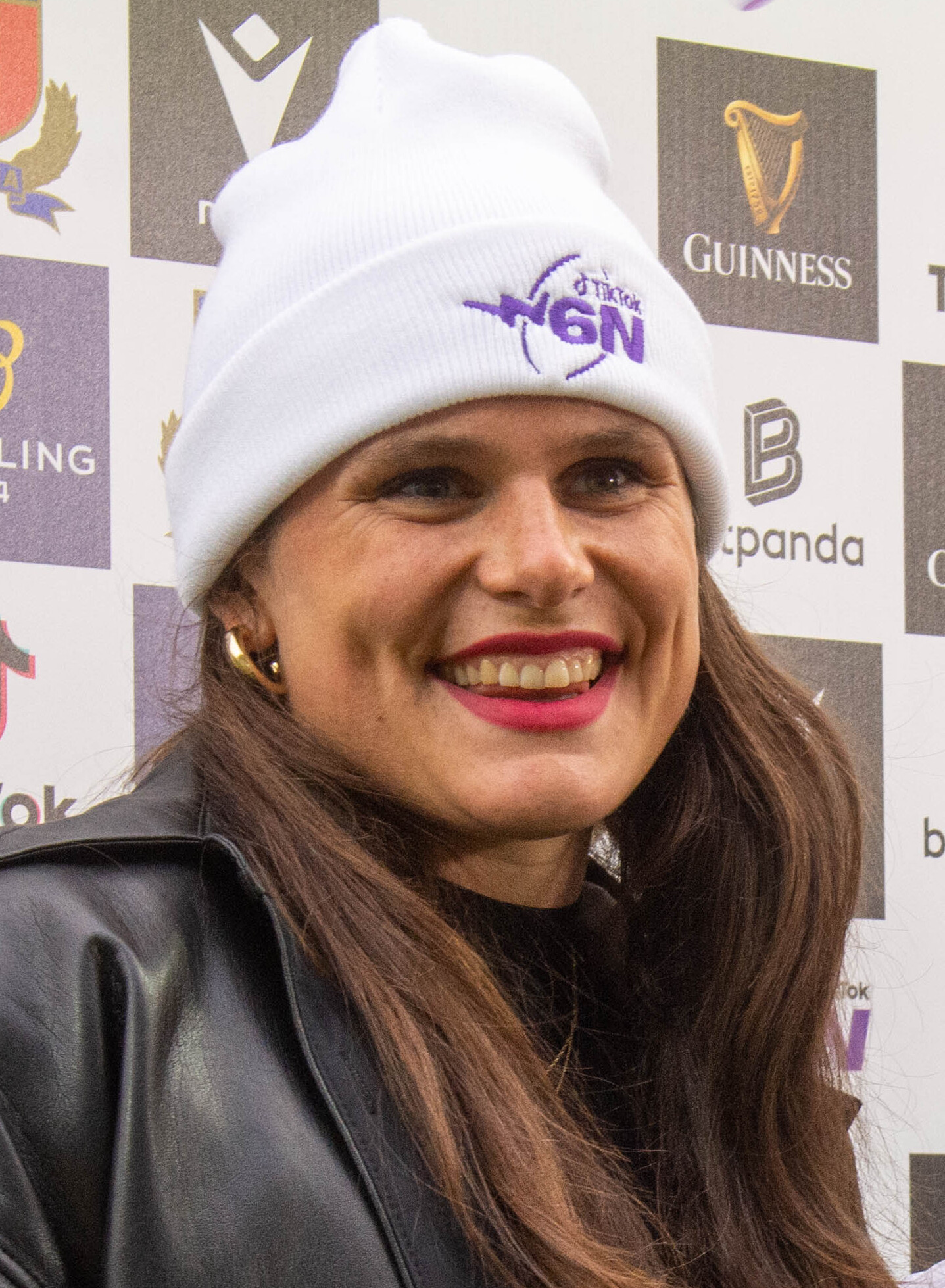
Maher in 2022

While still at Quinnipiac, Maher also played 7s for Scion Rugby Academy, where she impressed coaches Richie Walker and Emilie Bydwell, who selected her for the national rugby sevens team. Maher made her debut with the USA Rugby World Cup Sevens team in 2018 at a Women's SVNS tournament in Paris.

Maher was chosen to her first Olympic team at the 2020 Summer Olympics in Tokyo, which was the sport's second appearance at the games. She scored three tries throughout the tournament as the United States finished in sixth place. While attending the Olympics, she posted several behind-the-scenes videos that went viral on TikTok. She was selected again to represent the United States at the 2022 Rugby World Cup Sevens in Cape Town, where she helped the national team reach the semifinals.

In 2023, she had a severe injury from a collision during a training session against a men's rugby union team. She dislocated her tibia and broke her fibula. Her mother, a nurse, immediately flew out to help her through the injury. Initially, Maher was expected to be out for the rest of the 2023 season, but was able to get back in the game in time to help Team USA win gold at the Pan American Games.

Maher helped lead the United States to bronze at the 2024 Summer Olympics in Paris, the country's first Olympic medal in the sport. She scored tries in all three of their group stage matches. After being eliminated by gold medalists New Zealand in the semifinals, the United States narrowly defeated Australia in the bronze medal match.

=== 2024–present: Bristol Bears and National rugby XVs team ===
In December 2024, Maher signed for Bristol Bears in England’s Premiership Women's Rugby league on a three-month deal until the end of the season, marking her transition from rugby sevens to 15-player rugby union. Her contract officially began in January 2025. In response to unprecedented demand for tickets to see her debut, the fixture was moved from Shaftesbury Park, the regular home for the Bristol Bears Women, to Ashton Gate to accommodate a larger capacity crowd.

Maher made her debut for Bristol in the Premiership off the bench in a 40–17 home loss to Gloucester-Hartpury in front of a club record crowd of 9,240. The following game she scored her first try for the club, a 41–31 away victory against Exeter Chiefs Women. In July 2025, Maher was selected for the U.S. women’s national rugby XVs team to compete in the 2025 Women's Rugby World Cup in England the following month. The Eagles did not advance beyond the pool stage, though Maher played in all three games of that round.

== In the media ==
Maher has used her social media following to advocate body positivity and increased awareness of women's sports. In 2024, she was announced as a brand ambassador for Secret deodorant, as well as a skincare brand that she co-founded, Medalist. She is the most followed rugby union player on Instagram. In July 2024, she threw out the first pitch at a San Diego Padres game. In August 2024, she posed for the cover of the swimsuit edition of Sports Illustrated. In December 2024, she made the Forbes 30 under 30 list. In April 2025, it was announced that she'd return to Sports Illustrated Swimsuit edition again. In July 2025, at the ESPY Awards, she was named the Best Breakthrough Athlete of the year.

=== Dancing with the Stars ===
In September 2024, Maher was announced as one of the celebrities competing on season 33 of the reality dance competition Dancing with the Stars, partnered with Alan Bersten. She is the first rugby player to compete on the show, and the first female partner in Dancing with the Stars history to lift her male partner. They reached the finale and finished as the runners-up on November 26, 2024, behind The Bachelor star Joey Graziadei and his partner Jenna Johnson.

Episode #	Dance / Song	Theme	Judges' scores				Result
Episode #	Dance / Song	Theme	Inaba	Hough	Guest	Tonioli	Result
1	Cha-cha / "Man! I Feel Like a Woman!"	Premiere	6	6		6	No elimination
2	Salsa / "(I've Had) The Time of My Life"	Oscars	7	7		7	Safe
3	Foxtrot / "Lady Marmalade"	Soul Train	8	7	8^{1}	7	No elimination
4	Jive / "Come On, Feel the Noise"	Heavy Metal	7	6	7^{2}	6	Safe
5	Rumba / "My Way"	Dedication	8	8	8^{3}	8	Safe
6	Jazz / "Surface Pressure"; Team Freestyle (Team Goofs) / "I 2 I"	Disney	9; 9	8; 9		8; 9	Safe
7	Tango / "Psycho Killer"	Halloween Nightmares	8	8		8	Safe
8	Quickstep / "Chuck Berry"; Instant Salsa / "Da' Dip"	500th Episode Celebration	10; 8	9; 8		9; 8	Safe
9 Semi-finals	Paso doble / "Unholy"; Viennese waltz / "Golden Hour"	Semi-finals	9; 10	10; 9		9; 10	No elimination
10; Finals	Jive / "Shake a Tail Feather"; Freestyle / "Femininomenon"	Finals	9; 10	9; 10		9; 10	Runners-up

^{1} Score awarded by guest judge Rosie Perez
^{2} Score awarded by guest judge Gene Simmons
^{3} Score awarded by guest judge Mark Ballas
