= 2018 Long Beach State 49ers men's volleyball team =

American college volleyball season

2018 Long Beach State 49ers men's volleyball

NCAA tournament champion Big West tournament champion Big West regular season champion UCSB Asics Invitational champion
- Conference: Big West Conference
- Record: 28–1 (9–1 Big West)
- Head coach: Alan Knipe (15th season)
- Assistant coaches: Nick MacRae (6th season); Scott Touzinsky (1st season)
- Home arena: Walter Pyramid

2018 Big West Conference men's volleyball standings
	Conf.				Overall
Team	W		L	PCT	W		L	PCT
No. 1 Long Beach State ‍†‍‡‍^{y}	9	–	1	.900	28	–	1	.966
No. 4 Hawaii ‍‍‍	6	–	4	.600	19	–	8	.704
No. 5 UC Irvine ‍‍‍^{y}	6	–	4	.600	21	–	10	.677
No. 9 Cal State Northridge ‍‍‍	5	–	5	.500	16	–	11	.593
No. 12 UC Santa Barbara ‍‍‍	4	–	6	.400	11	–	13	.458
UC San Diego ‍‍‍	0	–	10	.000	9	–	19	.321
† – Conference champion ‡ – Big West tournament champion y – Invited to the NCAA tournament Rankings from AVCA

The 2018 Long Beach State 49ers men's volleyball team represented Long Beach State University in the 2018 NCAA Division I & II men's volleyball season. The 49ers, led by fifteenth year head coach Alan Knipe, played their home games at Walter Pyramid. The 49ers competed as members of the Big West Conference, which was sponsoring men's volleyball for the first time, and were picked to win the Big West in the preseason poll. LBSU won the national championship, the second in program history.

== Roster ==
2018 Long Beach State 49ers Roster
Defensive Specialist/Libero: 3 Matt Butler - Senior; 6 Trevor Briggs - (redshirt) Freshman; 9 Jordan Molina - Junior; Middle Blockers: 8 Gary Adams - Freshman; 12 Zane Griggs - (redshirt) Freshman; 13 Simon Anderson - Freshman; 21 Jason Willahan - Senior; 23 Zach Gates - Senior; 25 Nick Amado - (redshirt) Junior	Outside Hitters: 2 Louis Richards - Junior; 4 Bjarne Huus - Senior; 5 Kyle Ensing - Junior; 11 TJ DeFalco - Junior; 17 Ryan Poole - Freshman; 18 Jevan Coronado - Freshman; 19 Ethan Siegfried - Freshman; 31 Spencer Olivier - Freshman	Opposite Hitters: 1 Davis Cannon - Senior; 2 Louis Richards - Junior; 5 Kyle Ensing - Junior; 30 Alexander Anastassiades - Freshman; Setters: 10 Josh Tuaniga - Junior; 22 Gary Trejo - Junior; 24 Carlso Rivera - Freshman

== Schedule ==
TV/Internet Streaming/Radio information:

22 West Media will carry select Long Beach State men's volleyball matches on the radio.
Big West TV will carry all home games and select conference road games.

Date Time	Opponent	Rank	Arena City (Tournament)	Television	Score	Attendance	Record (Big West Record)
1/3; 7 p.m.	McKendree	#2	Walter Pyramid; Long Beach, CA	Big West TV	W 3–0 (25–16, 28–26, 25–22)	398	1–0
1/5; 10 a.m.	Princeton	#2	Rob Gym; Santa Barbara, CA (UC Santa Barbara Asics Invitational)		W 3–0 (25–16, 25–11, 25–14)	125	2–0
1/5; 8 p.m.	Ball State	#2	Rob Gym; Santa Barbara, CA (UC Santa Barbara Asics Invitational)		W 3–1 (25–19, 22–25, 25–21, 25–16)	121	3–0
1/6; 2:30 p.m.	St. Francis	#2	Rob Gym; Santa Barbara, CA (UC Santa Barbara Asics Invitational)		W 3–0 (25–17, 25–22, 25–13)	120	4–0
1/12; 5 p.m.	#11 Lewis	#2	Neil Carey Arena; Romeoville, IL	GLVC SN	W 3–0 (27–25, 25–18, 25–19)	257	5–0
1/13; 5:30 p.m.	#7 Loyola	#2	Joseph J. Gentile Arena; Chicago, IL	ESPN3	W 3–0 (25–15, 25–17, 25–21)	1,002	6–0
1/26; 7:30 p.m.	Stanford	#1	Maples Pavilion; Irvine, CA	P12+	W 3–0 (25–21, 25–19, 25–23)	429	7–0
1/26; 6 p.m.	Stanford	#1	Walter Pyramid; Long Beach, CA	Big West TV	L 3–0 (25–13, 25–17, 25–14)	1,415	8–0
1/28; 7 p.m.	#13 USC	#1	Walter Pyramid; Long Beach, CA	Big West TV	W 3–0 (25–22, 25–17, 25–16)	1,627	9–0
2/2; 7 p.m.	Concordia Irvine	#1	CU Arena; Irvine, CA	Big West TV	W 3–0 (25–20, 25–14, 25–13)	1,136	10–0
2/8; 4 p.m.	Harvard	#1	Malkin Athletic Center; Cambridge, MA	Ivy League Net	W 3–0 (25–15, 25–15, 25–20)	167	11–0
2/10; 4 p.m.	George Mason	#1	Recreation Athletic Complex; Fairfax, VA	George Mason All-Access	W 3–0 (26–24, 25–22, 25–19)	550	12–0
2/17; 7:30 p.m.	#2 UCLA	#1	Walter Pyramid; Long Beach, CA	Big West TV	W 3–1 (23–25, 25–15, 25–19, 25–21)	4,560	13–0
2/21; 7:30 p.m.	#2 UCLA	#1	Pauley Pavilion; Los Angeles, CA	P12+	W 3–1 (25–21, 23–25, 25–19, 25–21)	1,910	14–0
3/2; 7 p.m.	#12 CSUN*	#1	Matadome; Northridge, CA	ESPN3	W 3–0 (25–22, 25–23, 25–20)	957	15–0 (1–0)
3/4; 7 p.m.	#12 CSUN*	#1	Walter Pyramid; Long Beach, CA	Big West TV	W 3–0 (25–18, 25–18, 25–17)	1,033	16–0 (2–0)
3/7; 7 p.m.	Mount Olive	#1	Walter Pyramid; Long Beach, CA	Big West TV	W 3–0 (25–18, 25–16, 25–14)	708	17–0
3/15; 7 p.m.	#12 UCSB*	#1	Walter Pyramid; Long Beach, CA	Big West TV	W 3–0 (25–17, 25–19, 25–19)	1,135	18–0 (3–0)
3/16; 7 p.m.	#12 UCSB*	#1	Rob Gym; Santa Barbara, CA	Big West TV	W 3–1 (24–26, 25–15, 25–14, 25–20)	750	19–0 (4–0)
3/30; 7 p.m.	#4 UC Irvine*	#1	Walter Pyramid; Long Beach, CA	Big West TV	W 3–2 (22–25, 25–15, 25–16, 21–25, 15–9)	2,077	20–0 (5–0)
3/31; 7 p.m.	#4 UC Irvine*	#1	Bren Events Center; Irvine, CA	Big West TV	W 3–1 (25–18, 25–21, 22–15, 25–20)	1,265	21–0 (6–0)
4/6; 7 p.m.	UC San Diego*	#1	RIMAC Arena; La Jolla, CA	Big West TV	W 3–0 (25–22, 25–19, 25–17)	606	22–0 (7–0)
4/7; 7 p.m.	UC San Diego*	#1	Walter Pyramid; Long Beach, CA	Big West TV	W 3–0 (25–21, 25–18, 25–13)	1,411	23–0 (8–0)
4/13; 9 p.m.	#6 Hawai'i*	#1	Stan Sheriff Center; Honolulu, HI	SPEC HI; Big West TV	W 3–2 (25–16, 17–25, 26–24, 25–27, 22–20)	4,982	24–0 (9–0)
4/14; 9 p.m.	#6 Hawai'i*	#1	Stan Sheriff Center; Honolulu, HI	SPEC HI; Big West TV	L 3–2 (25–21, 22–25, 23–25, 25–20, 15–11)	5,966	24–1 (9–1)
4/20; 7:30 p.m.	#9 CSUN*	#1	Walter Pyramid; Long Beach, CA (Big West Semifinal)	ESPN3	W 3–0 (25–23, 25–13, 25–17)	1,795	25–1
4/20; 7 p.m.	#6 Hawai'i*	#1	Walter Pyramid; Long Beach, CA (Big West Championship)	ESPN3	W 3–0 (25–23, 25–14, 25–19)	2,325	26–1
5/3; 5 p.m.	#6 Ohio State	#1	Pauley Pavilion; Los Angeles, CA (NCAA Semifinal)	NCAA.com	W 3–1 (25–22, 25–23, 25–27, 32–30)	4,249	27–1
5/5; 4 p.m.	#3 UCLA	#1	Pauley Pavilion; Los Angeles, CA (NCAA Championship)	ESPN2	W 3–2 (25–19, 23–25, 20–25, 26–24, 15–12)	7,248	28–1

*-Indicates conference match.
Times listed are Pacific Time Zone.

== Honors ==
- All-Tournament Team: T.J. Defalco, Kyle Ensing, and Josh Tuaniga (also the Most Outstanding Player)
