= 2018 Independent Volleyball Association tournament =

2018 NCAA Division I & II men's volleyball Independent standings
	Conf.				Overall
Team	W		L	PCT	W		L	PCT
Lincoln Memorial ‍‍‡‍	5	–	1	.833	14	–	13	.519
Coker (SC) ‍‍‍	4	–	2	.667	13	–	10	.565
Alderson Broaddus ‍‍‍	2	–	4	.333	4	–	20	.167
Queens ‍‍‍	1	–	5	.167	8	–	21	.276
‡ – 2018 IVA Tournament champion As of April 15, 2018; Rankings from AVCA

The 2018 Independent Volleyball Association Tournament was the men's volleyball tournament held by the Independent Universities during the 2018 NCAA Division I & II men's volleyball season. It was held in April 13 through April 14, 2018 at Alderson Broaddus University's Rex Pyles Arena. The winner is eligible for the wildcard spot in the 2018 NCAA Volleyball Tournament and is granted the title of Independent Volleyball Association Champion.

== Seeds ==
All four teams qualify for the tournament. Seeding is based on head-to-head matches during the regular season, with a tiebreaker system to seed teams with identical conference records.

Seed	School	Conference
1	Lincoln Memorial	5–1
2	Coker	4–2
3	Alderson Broaddus	2–4
4	Queens	1–5

== Schedule and results ==
Time Network	Matchup	Score	Attendance	Commentators
Semifinals – Friday, April 13
4:00 pm Stretch	No. 1 Lincoln Memorial vs. No. 4 Queens	3–0 (25–17, 25–14, 25–20)	63	No commentary
7:00 pm Stretch	No. 2 Coker vs. No. 3 Alderson Broaddus	3–2 (25–21, 20–25, 21–25, 25–22, 19–17)	63	No commentary
Consolation – Saturday, April 14
12:00 pm Stretch	No. 3 Alderson Broaddus vs. No. 4 Queens	3–0 (25–22, 25–15, 25–17)	74	No commentary
Championship – Saturday, April 14
3:00 pm Stretch	No. 1 Lincoln Memorial vs. No. 2 Coker	3–2 (25–21, 24–26, 32–30, 23–25, 15–10)	74	No commentary
Game times are ET. Rankings denote tournament seeding.

== Bracket ==
Semifinals; Friday, April 13
1	Lincoln Memorial	3
4	Queens	0
2	Coker	3
3	Alderson Broaddus	2

Championship; Saturday, April 14
1	Lincoln Memorial	3
2	Coker	2
Consolation; Saturday, April 14
3	Alderson Broaddus	3
4	Queens	0
