= Harvard women's rugby =

Harvard
- Nickname: Crimson
- Founded: 1982; 44 years ago
- Location: Boston, Massachusetts
- Ground: Mignone Field 42.371°N 71.128°W
- Coach: Mel Denham
- League: Ivy Rugby Conference
Team kit

Official website
- gocrimson.com/sports/womens-rugby/

The Harvard Women's Rugby team is the women's rugby union program that represents Harvard University in Division I tournaments organised by the National Intercollegiate Rugby Association (NIRA). Harvard competes in the Ivy Rugby Conference.

The club began activities in 1982, although the university's first involvement with the sport can be traced to 1874, when Harvard played a two-game series vs Canadian McGill University.

== History ==
The club was founded in 1982, Harvard women have won two national championships (1998, 2011) as a club team.

The team won its first collegiate national championship in 1998, also becoming the first champion team to be coached by an all-female staff. Harvard Radcliffe (as they were named by then) finished 15th at national level in 2005, and qualified for nationals at Penn State in 2006. The team captured the USA Rugby Collegiate Division II National Championship in 2011 after beating UW-LaCrosse, Norwich, Western Washington, and Notre Dame. Following that success, the team was promoted to Division I, joining the recently formed Ivy Rugby Conference.

In 2013, the team became part of NCAA Emerging Sports for Women and Harvard University's 42nd varsity sport, plays other rugby union NCAA teams. Notable honors include: 2019 National Intercollegiate Rugby Association (NIRA) National Champions, Ivy League Champions (2018, 2013), Ivy League Sevens Champions (2016, 2017, 2019)

The team won their 2nd. NIRA Division I Championship in 2023 after defeating Dartmouth 20–12 in the final. Harvard had previously won the competition in 2019. Harvard went on to a repeat in 2024 (a 19-12 victory over Dartmouth), and secured a 'threepeat' in 2025, making history by beating #2 Lindenwood 22-19 to deliver their fourth NCAA Women's Rugby Division 1 championship. Harvard finished the season with an undefeated record of 9-0 under coach Mel Denham, who claimed her fourth championship in nine years. Lennox London scored the winning try, and Tiahna Padilla was named the 2025 NIRA Championship Most Valuable Player, her second time winning the title.

== Facilities ==
Harvard play their home matches on Roberto A. Mignone Field, located at Harvard's Soldiers Field Park.

== Titles ==
- NIRA Division I Championship (2): 2019, 2023, 2024, 2025
