= 2018 Midwestern Intercollegiate Volleyball Association tournament =

2018 Midwestern Intercollegiate Volleyball Association standings
	Conf.				Overall
Team	W		L	PCT	W		L	PCT
No. 6 Ohio State ‍†‍‡‍^{y}	11	–	3	.786	23	–	5	.821
No. 7 Loyola Chicago ‍†‍‍	11	–	3	.786	23	–	7	.767
No. 11 Ball State ‍‍‍	10	–	4	.714	18	–	12	.600
No. 10 Lewis ‍‍‍	9	–	5	.643	19	–	11	.633
No. 15 Fort Wayne ‍‍‍	6	–	8	.429	18	–	11	.621
McKendree ‍‍‍	6	–	8	.429	11	–	15	.423
Lindenwood ‍‍‍	3	–	11	.214	9	–	16	.360
Quincy ‍‍‍	0	–	14	.000	12	–	19	.387
† – Conference champion ‡ – MIVA tournament champion y – Invited to the NCAA tournament Rankings from AVCA

The 2018 Midwestern Intercollegiate Volleyball Association Tournament is the men's volleyball tournament for the Midwestern Intercollegiate Volleyball Association during the 2018 NCAA Division I & II men's volleyball season. It is being held April 14 through April 21, 2018 at campus sites. The winner receives the Association's automatic bid to the 2018 NCAA Volleyball Tournament.

== Seeds ==
All eight teams are eligible for the postseason, with the highest seed hosting each round. Teams were seeded by record within the conference, with a tiebreaker system to seed teams with identical conference records.

Seed	School	Conference	Tiebreaker
1	Ohio State	11–3	Split 1–1 w/ Loyola but won in fewer sets (3–1)
2	Loyola	11–3	Split 1–1 w/ Ohio State but won in more sets (3–2)
3	Ball State	10–4	–
4	Lewis	9–5	–
5	Fort Wayne	6–8	2–0 vs. McKendree
6	McKendree	6–8	0–2 vs. Fort Wayne
7	Lindenwood	3–11	–
8	Quincy	0–14	–

== Schedule and results ==
Time Network	Matchup	Score	Attendance	Broadcasters
Quarterfinals – Saturday, April 14
7:00 pm Sports Live	No. 1 Ohio State vs. No. 8 Quincy	3–0 (25–22, 25–18, 25–12)	1,013	No commentary
7:00 pm ESPN3	No. 2 Loyola vs. No. 7 Lindenwood	3–0 (25–19, 25–21, 25–22)	625	Jason Goch & Lauren Mikos
7:30 pm Ball State Vision	No. 3 Ball State vs. No. 6 McKendree	3–0 (26–24, 25–20, 25–23)	528	No commentary
7:00 pm GLVC SN	No. 4 Lewis vs. No. 5 Fort Wayne	3–0 (25–22, 25–22, 25–18)	317	No commentary
Semifinals – Wednesday, April 18
7:00 pm BTN+	No. 1 Ohio State vs. No. 4 Lewis	3–2 (25–9, 25–17, 22–25, 20–25, 15–8)	741	No commentary
7:00 pm NBCS CHIC+	No. 2 Loyola vs. No. 3 Ball State	3–1 (22–25, 25–19, 25–15, 25–22)	776	Jason Goch & Ray Gooden
Championship – Saturday, April 21
7:00 pm BTN+	No. 1 Ohio State vs. No. 2 Loyola	3–0 (25–20, 25–23, 25–19)	1,364	Charlie Danis & Luke Wood Maloney
Game times are host team times (ET and CT). Rankings denote tournament seeding.

== Bracket ==
Quarterfinals; Saturday, April 14
1	Ohio State	3
8	Quincy	0
4	Lewis	3
5	Fort Wayne	0
2	Loyola	3
7	Lindenwood	0
3	Ball State	3
6	McKendree	0

Semifinals; Wednesday, April 18
1	Ohio State	3
4	Lewis	2
2	Loyola	3
3	Ball State	1

Championship; Saturday, April 21
1	Ohio State	3
2	Loyola	0
