= 2018 Conference Carolinas men's volleyball tournament =

2018 Conference Carolinas men's volleyball standings
	Conf.				Overall
Team	W		L	PCT	W		L	PCT
King ‍†‍‡‍^{y}	15	–	1	.938	23	–	5	.821
Barton ‍†‍‍	15	–	1	.938	21	–	8	.724
Mount Olive ‍‍‍	11	–	5	.688	16	–	13	.552
Belmont Abbey ‍‍‍	8	–	8	.500	13	–	16	.448
North Greenville ‍‍‍	7	–	9	.438	13	–	16	.448
Emmanuel * ‍‍‍	5	–	11	.313	9	–	16	.360
Limestone ‍‍‍	5	–	11	.313	8	–	20	.286
Erskine ‍‍‍	4	–	12	.250	7	–	20	.259
Lees–McRae ‍‍‍	2	–	14	.125	4	–	22	.154
† – Conference champion ‡ – Conference Carolinas tournament champion y – Invited to the NCAA tournament * – Emmanuel ineligible for postseason due to NAIA to NCAA transfer requirements Rankings from AVCA

The 2018 Conference Carolinas men's volleyball tournament is the men's volleyball tournament for Conference Carolinas during the 2018 NCAA Division I & II men's volleyball season. It is being held April 17 through April 21, 2018 at campus sites. The winner receives the conference's automatic bid to the 2018 NCAA Volleyball Tournament.

== Seeds ==
Eight of the nine teams are eligible for the postseason, with the highest seed hosting each round. Teams are seeded by record within the conference, with a tiebreaker system to seed teams with identical conference records. Emmanuel is ineligible as they are still transitioning from NAIA to NCAA.

Seed	School	Conference	Tiebreaker
1	King	15–1	Overall sets won against the league (51 of 57)
2	Barton	15–1	Overall sets won against the league (51 of 59)
3	Mount Olive	11–5	–
4	Belmont Abbey	8–8	–
5	North Greenville	7–9	–
6	Limestone	5–11	–
7	Erskine	4–12	–
8	Lees-McRae	2–14	–

== Schedule and results ==
Time	Matchup	Score	Attendance	Broadcasters
Quarterfinals – Tuesday, April 17
6:30 pm UStream	No. 1 King vs. No. 8 Lees-McRae	3–0 (25–12, 25–12, 25–15)	297	James Fisher
6:30 pm UStream	No. 2 Barton vs. No. 7 Erskine	3–0 (25–15, 25–18, 25–18)	100	Doug Page
6:30 pm UStream	No. 3 Mount Olive vs. No. 6 Limestone	3–0 (25–21, 25–18, 25–19)	116	No commentary
6:30 pm UStream	No. 4 Belmont Abbey vs. No. 5 North Greenville	3–1 (25–20, 25–21, 20–25, 25–23)	164	No commentary
Semifinals – Friday, April 20
5:00 pm UStream	No. 1 King vs. No. 4 Belmont Abbey	3–1 (25–12, 25–19, 25–27, 25–15)	312	Kendall Lewis & Justin Bass
7:30 pm UStream	No. 2 Barton vs. No. 3 Mount Olive	3–1 (27–25, 24–26, 25–20, 25–19)	257	Kendall Lewis & Justin Bass
Championship – Saturday, April 21
6:30 pm UStream	No. 1 King vs. No. 2 Barton	3–0 (25–10, 25–21, 25–21)	437	Kendall Lewis & Justin Bass
All game times are ET. Rankings denote tournament seeding.

== Bracket ==
Quarterfinals; Tuesday, April 17
1	King	3
8	Lees-McRae	0
4	Belmont Abbey	3
5	North Greenville	1
2	Barton	3
7	Erskine	0
3	Mount Olive	3
6	Limestone	0

Semifinals; Friday, April 20
1	King	3
4	Belmont Abbey	1
2	Barton	3
3	Mount Olive	1

Championship; Saturday, April 21
1	King	3
2	Barton	0
