= 2018 BYU Cougars men's volleyball team =

American college volleyball season

2018 BYU Cougars men's volleyball

2018 Outriggers Classic Champions 2018 MPSF Champions

2018 NCAA Tournament, L- Semifinals
- Conference: Mountain Pacific Sports Federation
- Record: 22-7 (10-2 MPSF)
- Head coach: Shawn Olmstead (3rd season)
- Assistant coaches: Luka Slabe (3rd season); Jaylen Reyes (3rd season)
- Home arena: Smith Fieldhouse

The 2018 BYU Cougars men's volleyball team represented Brigham Young University in the 2018 NCAA Division I & II men's volleyball season. The Cougars, led by third year head coach Shawn Olmstead, played their home games at Smith Fieldhouse. The Cougars were members of the MPSF and were picked to win the MPSF in the preseason poll.

2018 Mountain Pacific Sports Federation men's volleyball standings
	Conf.				Overall
Team	W		L	PCT	W		L	PCT
No. 2 BYU ‍†‍‡‍^{y}	10	–	2	.833	22	–	7	.759
No. 3 UCLA ‍‍‍^{y}	9	–	3	.750	26	–	8	.765
No. 8 Pepperdine ‍‍‍	8	–	4	.667	15	–	8	.652
No. 13 Concordia Irvine ‍‍‍	5	–	7	.417	16	–	15	.516
No. 14 Grand Canyon ‍‍‍	4	–	8	.333	18	–	11	.621
USC ‍‍‍	3	–	9	.250	8	–	20	.286
Stanford ‍‍‍	3	–	9	.250	6	–	20	.231
† – Conference champion ‡ – MPSF tournament champion y – Invited to the NCAA tournament Rankings from AVCA

== Season highlights ==
- Will be filled in as the season progresses.

== Roster ==
2018 BYU Cougars roster
Defensive specialist/libero: 6 Zach Hendrickson - Freshman; 8 Erik Sikes - Senior; 10 Taylor Richards - Junior; Middle blockers: 1 Price Jarman - Senior; 16 Felipe de Brito Ferreira - Freshman; 17 Branden Oberender - Freshman; 18 Miki Jauhiainen - Sophomore; 21 Christian Rupert - (redshirt) Junior	Outside hitters: 7 Cyrus Fa'alogo - Sophomore; 9 Andrew Lincoln - Sophomore; 11 Zach Eschenberg - Sophomore; 14 Storm Fa'agata-Tufuga - Sophomore; 15 Brenden Sander - Senior; 19 Alex Ah Sue - Freshman; 24 Tanner Skabelund - (redshirt) Sophomore	Opposite hitters: 5 Gabi Garcia Fernandez - Freshman; 7 Cyrus Fa'alogo - Sophomore; 9 Andrew Lincoln - Sophomore; 13 Charlie Sragusa - Freshman; Setters: 3 Wil Stanley - Sophomore; 4 Leo Durkin - Senior; 7 Cyrus Fa'alogo - Sophomore

== Schedule ==
TV/Internet Streaming information:

TheW.tv will air select games when BYUtv has basketball commitments.

Date time	Opponent	Rank	Arena city (tournament)	Television	Score	Attendance	Record (MPSF record)
1/5; 7 p.m.	#13 Loyola-Chicago	#3	Smith Fieldhouse; Provo, UT	BYUtv	L 2–3 (25–22, 21–25, 25–20, 23–25, 12–15)	3,339	0–1
1/6; 7 p.m.	#6 Lewis	#3	Smith Fieldhouse; Provo, UT	TheW.tv	W 3–1 (25–21, 23–25, 25–15, 25–15)	3,024	1–1
1/12; 5:30 p.m.	#14 Ball State	#6	Worthen Arena; Muncie, IL	ESPN3	W 3–1 (25–19, 16–25, 25–15, 25–20)	1,764	2–1
1/13; 5 p.m.	#1 Ohio State	#6	St. John Arena; Columbus, OH	Buckeye Vision	W 3–2 (21–25, 25–21, 25–20, 21–25, 15–8)	2,237	3–1
1/19; 8 p.m.	Barton	#5	Smith Fieldhouse; Provo, UT	BYUtv	W 3–0 (25–12, 25–15, 25–17)	3,595	4–1
1/20; 8 p.m.	Barton	#5	Smith Fieldhouse; Provo, UT	TheW.tv	W 3–0 (25–22, 25–22, 26–24)	2,116	5–1
1/26; 8 p.m.	#6 UC Irvine	#5	Bren Events Center; Irvine, CA	Big West TV	L 1–3 (22–25, 23–25, 25–20, 21–25)	1,777	5–2
1/27; 8 p.m.	#6 UC Irvine	#5	Bren Events Center; Irvine, CA	Big West TV	L 2–3 (16–25, 26–24, 18–25, 25–21, 13–15)	1,637	5–3
1/28; 7 p.m.	#14 UCSB	#6	Smith Fieldhouse; Provo, UT	BYUtv	L 0–3 (23–25, 20–25, 25–27)	3,518	5–4
2/3; 7 p.m.	#14 UCSB	#6	Smith Fieldhouse; Provo, UT	BYUtv	W 3–0 (25–23, 25–19, 25–20)	4,086	6–4
2/8; 7 p.m.	UC San Diego	#7	RIMAC Arena; La Jolla, CA	Big West TV	W 3–1 (18–25, 25–19, 25–22, 25–16)	408	7–4
2/10; 8 p.m.	#14 USC*	#7	Galen Center; Los Angeles, CA	P12+ USC	W 3–1 (25–23, 21–25, 25–23, 27–25)	550	8–4 (1–0)
2/15; 7 p.m.	#10 Grand Canyon*	#7	GCU Arena; Phoenix, AZ	GCU TV	W 3–0 (25–17, 25–20, 25–17)	3,314	9–4 (2–0)
2/17; 2 p.m.	Concordia Irvine*	#7	CU Arena; Irvine, CA	CIU on Stretch	W 3–0 (25–21, 25–22, 25–15)	350	10–4 (3–0)
2/23; 8 p.m.	Stanford*	#6	Maples Pavilion; Stanford, CA	P12	W 3–1 (33–31, 25–27, 25–23, 25–21)	411	11–4 (4–0)
2/24; 8 p.m.	Stanford*	#6	Smith Fieldhouse; Provo, UT	BYUtv	W 3–2 (23–25, 20–25, 25–14, 25–10, 15–12)	3,458	12–4 (5–0)
3/1; 7 p.m.	#8 Pepperdine*	#5	Smith Fieldhouse; Provo, UT	TheW.tv	W 3–2 (22–25, 27–29, 25–23, 25–22, 15–11)	2,585	13–4 (6–0)
3/3; 7 p.m.	#3 UCLA*	#5	Smith Fieldhouse; Provo, UT	TheW.tv	W 3–0 (25–23, 25–21, 25–20)	5,017	14–4 (7–0)
3/8; 7 p.m.	#11 Penn State	#4	Stan Sheriff Center; Honolulu, HI (Outriggers Classic)		W 3–2 (21–25, 29–27, 25–22, 19–25, 15–13)	3,092	15–4
3/9; 7 p.m.	#8 Lewis	#4	Stan Sheriff Center; Honolulu, HI (Outriggers Classic)		W 3–1 (25–15, 18–25, 25–23, 26–24)	4,087	16–4
3/10; 10 p.m.	#2 Hawai'i	#4	Stan Sheriff Center; Honolulu, HI (Outriggers Classic)	SPEC HI; Big West TV	W 3–1 (20–25, 25–20, 25–21, 25–23)	5,989	17–4
3/15; 7 p.m.	USC*	#2	Smith Fieldhouse; Provo, UT	BYUtv	W 3–1 (23–25, 25–16, 25–23, 25–21)	3,240	18–4 (8–0)
3/29; 7 p.m.	#14 Concordia Irvine*	#2	Smith Fieldhouse; Provo, UT	BYUtv	L 2–3 (25–19, 25–16, 22–25, 21–25, 14–16)	3,921	18–5 (8–1)
3/31; 7 p.m.	#13 Grand Canyon*	#2	Smith Fieldhouse; Provo, UT	BYUtv	W 3–0 (25–17, 25–17, 25–23)	3,568	19–5 (9–1)
4/5; 8 p.m.	#4 Pepperdine*	#2	Firestone Fieldhouse; Malibu, CA	TheW.tv	W 3–0 (25–20, 25–17, 25–14)	1,657	20–5 (10–1)
4/7; 8 p.m.	#5 UCLA*	#2	Pauley Pavilion; Los Angeles, CA	P12 LA	L 0–3 (21–25, 23–25, 22–25)	5,671	20–6 (10–2)
4/19; 7 p.m.	USC*	#4	Smith Fieldhouse; Provo, UT (MPSF Semifinal)	BYUtv	W 3–0 (25–17, 25–17, 25–22)	2,071	21–6
4/21; 7 p.m.	#2 UCLA*	#4	Smith Fieldhouse; Provo, UT (MPSF Championship)	BYUtv	W 3–1 (17–25, 25–21, 25–18, 25–21)	3,017	22–6
5/3; 8:30 p.m.	#3 UCLA	#2	Pauley Pavilion; Los Angeles, CA (NCAA Semifinal)	NCAA.com	L 1–3 (22–25, 26–24, 27–29, 19–25)	4,249	22–7

*-Indicates conference match.
Times listed are Mountain Time Zone.

== Announcers for televised games ==
- Loyola-Chicago: Jarom Jordan, Steve Vail, Karch Kiraly, & Lauren McClain
- Lewis: Robbie Bullough & Cosy Burnett
- Ball State: Mick Tidrow & Alex Thomas
- Ohio State: No commentary
- Barton: Jarom Jordan, Steve Vail, & Lauren McClain
- Barton: Jarom Jordan
- UC Irvine: No commentary
- UC Irvine: No commentary
- UCSB: Jarom Jordan, Steve Vail, & Lauren McClain
- UCSB: Jarom Jordan, Steve Vail, & Lauren McClain
- UC San Diego: Tim Strombel & Ricci Luyties
- USC: Paul Duchesne
- Grand Canyon: Michael Potter & Taylor Griffin
- Concordia Irvine: Jon O'Neill
- Stanford: Kevin Barnett
- Stanford: Jarom Jordan, Steve Vail, & Lauren McClain
- Pepperdine: Robbie Bullough & Cosy Burnett
- UCLA: Robbie Bullough & Amy Boswell
- Hawai'i: Scott Robbs & Chris McLachlin
- USC: Jarom Jordan, Steve Vail, & Lauren McClain
- Concordia Irvine: Jarom Jordan, Steve Vail, & Lauren McClain
- Grand Canyon: Jarom Jordan, Steve Vail, & Lauren McClain
- Pepperdine: Al Epstein
- UCLA: Kevin Barnett
- USC: Jarom Jordan, Steve Vail, & Lauren McClain
- UCLA: Jarom Jordan, Steve Vail, & Lauren McClain
- UCLA: Lincoln Rose
