= 2018 Big West Conference men's volleyball tournament =

2018 Big West Conference Men's Volleyball Tournament
- Classification: Division I/II
- Teams: 6
- Site: Walter Pyramid; Long Beach, California
- Champions: Long Beach State (1st title)
- Winning coach: Alan Knipe (1st title)
- MVP: Josh Tuaniga (Long Beach State)
- Attendance: 2,325
- Television: ESPN3
- Big West Conference Men's Volleyball Tournaments

2018 Big West Conference men's volleyball standings
	Conf.				Overall
Team	W		L	PCT	W		L	PCT
No. 1 Long Beach State ‍†‍‡‍^{y}	9	–	1	.900	28	–	1	.966
No. 4 Hawaii ‍‍‍	6	–	4	.600	19	–	8	.704
No. 5 UC Irvine ‍‍‍^{y}	6	–	4	.600	21	–	10	.677
No. 9 Cal State Northridge ‍‍‍	5	–	5	.500	16	–	11	.593
No. 12 UC Santa Barbara ‍‍‍	4	–	6	.400	11	–	13	.458
UC San Diego ‍‍‍	0	–	10	.000	9	–	19	.321
† – Conference champion ‡ – Big West tournament champion y – Invited to the NCAA tournament Rankings from AVCA

The 2018 Big West Conference men's volleyball tournament was a postseason men's volleyball tournament for the Big West Conference during the 2018 NCAA Division I & II men's volleyball season. It was held from April 19 through April 21, 2018 at Long Beach State University's Walter Pyramid. The winner received the conference's automatic bid to the 2018 NCAA Volleyball Tournament.

== Seeds ==
All six teams were eligible for the postseason, with the top two seeds receiving byes to the semifinals. The top seed has home court hosting rights for the tournament. Teams were seeded by record within the conference, with a tiebreaker system to seed teams with identical conference records.

Seed	School	Conference	Tiebreaker
1	Long Beach State	9–1	–
2	Hawai'i	6–4	1–1 vs. UC Irvine, 1–1 vs. Long Beach State
3	UC Irvine	6–4	1–1 vs. Hawai'i, 0–2 vs. Long Beach State
4	CSUN	5–5	–
5	UCSB	4–6	–
6	UC San Diego	0–10	–

== Schedule and results ==
Time Network	Matchup	Score	Attendance	Broadcasters
Quarterfinals – Thursday, April 19
5:00 pm ESPN3	No. 3 UC Irvine vs. No. 6 UC San Diego	3–0 (25–18, 25–18, 25–16)	708	Sam Farber, Dain Blanton, & Matt Brown
7:30 pm ESPN3	No. 4 CSUN vs. No. 5 UCSB	3-1 (25-18, 30-28, 12-25, 28-26)	708	Rahshaun Haylock, Dain Blanton, & Matt Brown
Semifinals – Friday, April 20
5:00 pm ESPN3	No. 2 Hawai'i vs. No. 3 UC Irvine	3–1 (25–16, 25–23, 20–25, 25–18)	1,795	Sam Farber, Dain Blanton, & Matt Brown
7:30 pm ESPN3	No. 1 Long Beach State vs. No. 4 CSUN	3–0 (25–23, 25–13, 25–17)	1,795	Rahshaun Haylock, Dain Blanton, & Matt Brown
Championship – Saturday, April 21
7:00 pm ESPN3	No. 1 Long Beach State vs. No. 2 Hawai'i	3–0 (25–23, 25–14, 25–19)	2,325	Rahshaun Haylock, Dain Blanton, & Matt Brown
Game times are PT. Rankings denote tournament seeding.

== Bracket ==
Quarterfinals; Thursday, April 19
4	CSUN	3
5	UCSB	1
3	UC Irvine	3
6	UC San Diego	0

Semifinals; Friday, April 20
1	Long Beach State	3
4	CSUN	0
2	Hawai'i	3
3	UC Irvine	1

Championship; Saturday, April 21
1	Long Beach State	3
2	Hawai'i	0
