= Harvard Crimson women's volleyball =

Women's volleyball team of Harvard University

- University: Harvard University
- Head coach: Jennifer Weiss (19th season)
- Conference: Ivy League; Division I (NCAA) Division
- Location: Cambridge, Massachusetts, US
- Home arena: Malkin Athletic Center
- Nickname: MAC
- Colors: Crimson, white, and black

The Harvard Crimson women's volleyball team represents Harvard University in National Collegiate Athletic Association (NCAA) Division I women's volleyball. Harvard competes as a member of the Ivy League and plays its home games at the Malkin Athletic Center (MAC) in Cambridge, Massachusetts.

== History ==
Harvard's first team took the court in 1981. The Crimson has won the Ivy League championship once in 2004.

== Players ==
=== Current roster ===
As of 30 Jan 2025

Positions

- OH: outside hitter
- L: libero
- S: setter
- MB: middle blocker

N°	Nat.	Player	Class	Position	Height
3	USA	Brynne Faltinsky	Junior	OH	6'0
4	USA	Lindsey ZhangHear	Senior	L	5'6
5	USA	Hannah Nguyen	Junior	L	5'5
7	USA	Corinne FureyHear	Senior	OH	6'1
8	USA	Nicole Cornell	First	S	6'0
10	TUR	Çagla Bayraktar	Sophomore	OH	5'11
11	USA	Alicia Guo	First	OH	5'11
12	USA	Taylor Larkin	First	MB	6'0
13	USA	Ali Farquhar	Sophomore	OH	6'3
14	USA	Bennett Trubey	First	MB	6'5
15	USA	Amelie Lima	Sophomore	S	5'10
16	USA	Yvette Easton	Sophomore	L	5'5
17	USA	Teia Piette	Senior	L	5'5

== See also ==
- Harvard Crimson men's volleyball
- Harvard Crimson
- List of NCAA Division I women's volleyball programs
