= Malkin Athletic Center =

Athletic building at Harvard in Cambridge, Massachusetts

Coordinates: 42.3714°N 71.1194°W

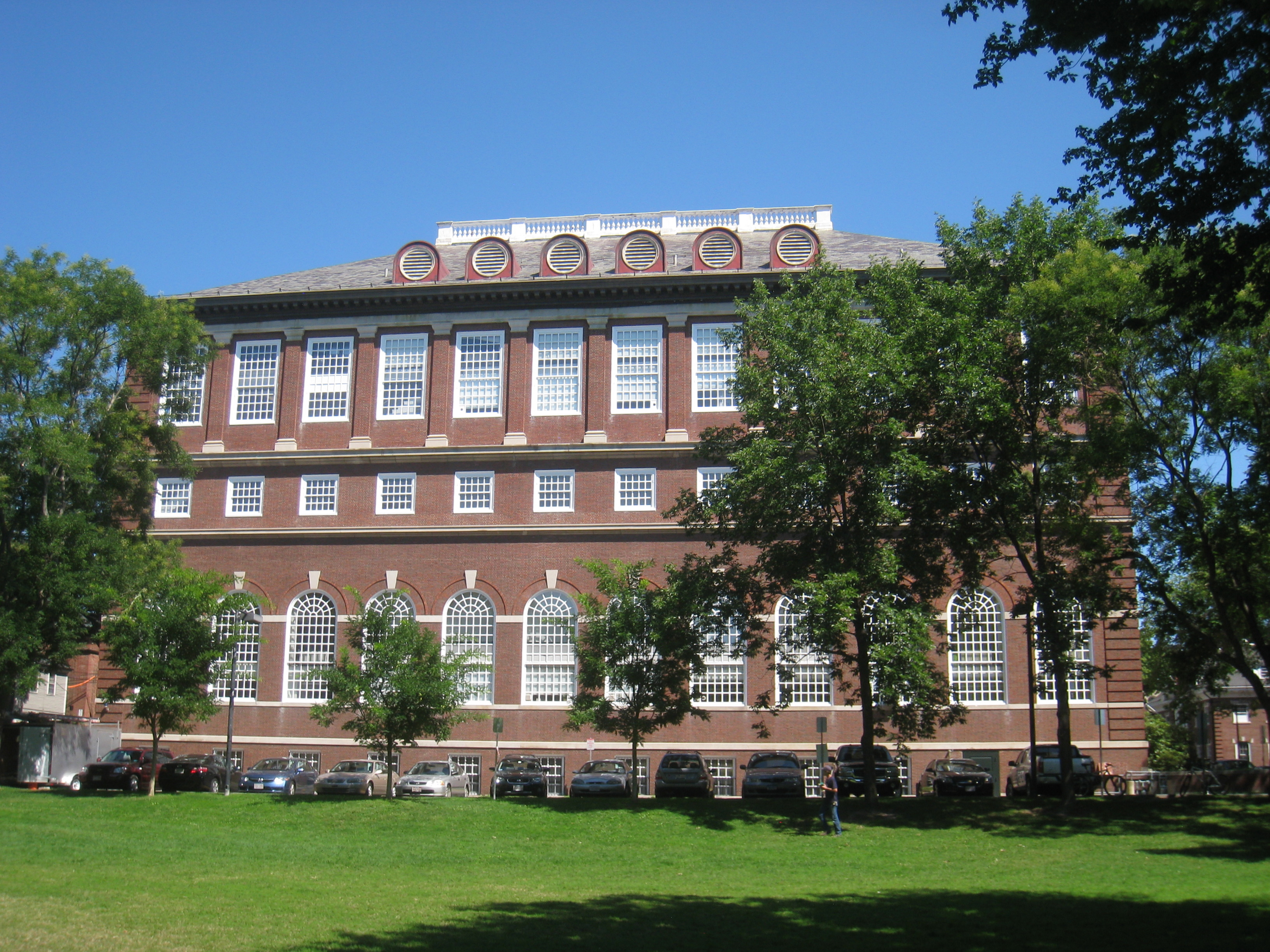
- Interactive map of Malkin Athletic Center
- Former names: Indoor Athletic Building (IAB)
- Location: 39 Holyoke Street; Cambridge, Massachusetts 02138
- Owner: Harvard University
- Operator: Harvard University
- Capacity: 1,000

Construction
- Opened: 1930
- Cost: $1 million (original) $4 million (1985)

Tenants
- Harvard Crimson (fencing, volleyball, wrestling)

The Malkin Athletic Center (MAC) is a 1,000-seat multi-purpose arena and athletic facility at Harvard University in Cambridge, Massachusetts.

Originally known as the Indoor Athletic Building (IAB), it is now named after Peter L. Malkin, who helped fund the refurbishment of the building in 1985. It currently houses the Harvard Fencing Team, Harvard Crimson men's volleyball, Harvard Crimson women's volleyball, and Harvard Crimson wrestling teams. Each year, the Harvard Invitational Shoryuhai Intercollegiate Kendo Tournament, or Shoryuhai (昇龍杯 Shōryuhai) is held at the Malkin Athletic Center. It also originally housed the Harvard Crimson men's basketball until they moved to the Lavietes Pavilion in 1982.
