= Harvard Crimson men's volleyball =

Men's volleyball team of Harvard University

- University: Harvard University
- Head coach: Brian Baise (11th season)
- Conference: EIVA
- Location: Cambridge, Massachusetts, US
- Home arena: Malkin Athletic Center
- Colors: Crimson, white, and black

AIAW/NCAA tournament appearance
- 2018

The Harvard Crimson men's volleyball team represents Harvard University in National Collegiate Athletic Association (NCAA) Division I men's volleyball. Harvard competes as a member of the Eastern Intercollegiate Volleyball Association and plays its home games at the Malkin Athletic Center (MAC) in Cambridge, Massachusetts.

== History ==
Harvard's first team took the court in 1981. During the team's most successful season to date, The Crimson was ranked No. 15 in the US by the American Volleyball Coaches Association (AVCA) on April 9, 2012. This marked the first time in program history that The Crimson was recognized in the national poll. 2018, the program won its first ever EIVA title as well as made its first appearance in the NCAA tournament.

== Players ==
=== Current roster ===
Number	Name	Class	Position	Height	Hometown
1	Andrew Lobo	First-Year	Outside hitter	6-2	Toronto, Ontario
2	Ethan Smith	Sophomore	Middle blocker	6-7	Laguna Niguel, California
3	Ryan Hong	Junior	Middle blocker/Outside Hitter	6-2	Honolulu, Hawaii
4	Kade McGovern	First-Year	Opposite hitter	6-6	Burbank, California
5	Azim Raheem	First-Year	Opposite hitter	6-6	Toronto, Ontario
6	Alessio Pignatelli	Junior	Libero/Defensive Specialist	5-11	Acqui Terme, Italy
7	Eric Li	Senior	Outside hitter	6-6	Edison, New Jersey
9	Ethan McCrary	Sophomore	Middle blocker	6-9	Mission Viejo, California
10	Logan Shepherd	First-Year	Outside hitter	6-4	Cave Springs, Arkansas
11	Will Polster	Junior	Outside hitter	6-1	Maryland Heights, Missouri
12	Campbell Schoenfeld	Senior	Outside hitter	6-8	N. Tonawanada, New York
13	Buddy Scott	Senior	Setter	6-6	Honolulu, Hawaii
16	Xuanthe Nguyen	First-Year	Libero	5-11	London, England
17	Jason Shen	Senior	Libero	5-11	Cupertino, California
18	Will Sorenson	Junior	Setter	6-1	Killdeer, Illinois
19	Owen Fanning	First-Year	Outside hitter	6-7	Needham, Massachusetts
21	James Bardin	First-Year	Setter	6-7	Aliso Viejo, California
22	Trevor Schultz	Sophomore	Middle blocker	6-6	Saint Augustine, Florida
23	Jeffrey Kwan	Sophomore	Libero/Outside Hitter	5-11	Cupertino, California

== See also ==
- Harvard Crimson women's volleyball
- Harvard Crimson
