= 2018 NCAA men's volleyball tournament =

2018 NCAA Men's National Collegiate Volleyball Tournament

Tournament details
- Dates: April 26–May 5, 2018
- Teams: 7

Final positions
- Champions: Long Beach State (2nd title)
- Runners-up: UCLA

Tournament statistics
- Matches played: 6
- Attendance: 14,211 (2,369 per match)

Awards
- Most Outstanding Player: Josh Tuaniga ^{(Long Beach State)}

The 2018 NCAA Men's National Collegiate Volleyball Tournament was the 49th annual tournament to determine the national champion of NCAA Division I and Division II men's collegiate indoor volleyball. The single-elimination tournament began on April 26 with a play-in match, with the remainder of the tournament hosted by UCLA from May 1–5 at Pauley Pavilion in Los Angeles. Long Beach State became the Champions for the second time in school history with a 5-set victory over UCLA.

== Qualification ==
With the addition of the Big West Conference, which began sponsoring men's volleyball in the 2018 season, to the ranks of automatic qualifying conferences, the tournament expanded from six teams to seven.

Since the 2015 season, the first after the completion of the transition of the last Division III institution competing at the National Collegiate level, Rutgers–Newark, to Division III volleyball, only NCAA men's volleyball programs from Division I and Division II have been eligible for this tournament. Five automatic bids are given to the five conference postseason tournament winners. The two remaining teams are given at-large bids by the NCAA men's volleyball tournament Committee.

=== Bids ===
School	Conference	Record	Berth
Long Beach State	Big West	26–1	Tournament champion
King	Conference Carolinas	23–5	Tournament champion
Harvard	EIVA	13–13	Tournament champion
Ohio State	MIVA	23–5	Tournament champion
BYU	MPSF	22–6	Tournament champion
UC Irvine	Big West	21–9	At-large
UCLA	MPSF	24–7	At-large

== Tournament bracket ==
Opening Round; Thursday, April 26th BTN+
6	Ohio State	3
7	King	0

Quarterfinals; Tuesday, May 1st, 2018; P12+
4	UC Irvine	2
6	Ohio State	3
3	UCLA	3
5	Harvard	1

Semifinals; Thursday, May 3rd NCAA.com
1	Long Beach State	3
6	Ohio State	1
2	BYU	1
3	UCLA	3

National Championship; Saturday, May 5th ESPN2
1	Long Beach State	3
3	UCLA	2

- The seven teams were seeded according to the same methods used to seed the teams in previous tournaments. As in recent tournaments, the top two seeds will receive byes into the semifinals.
- The bottom two seeds contested a "play-in" match on April 26 at the 6 seed's home court.
- Two quarterfinal matches were held at Pauley Pavilion on the campus of UCLA on May 1. (#4 vs. play-in winner; #3 vs. #5 seed)
- The semifinals were held at Pauley Pavilion on May 3. (#1 vs. #4–play-in winner; #2 vs. #3–#5 winner)
- The 2018 NCAA Championship match was held at Pauley Pavilion on May 5.

== Schedule and results ==
Time	Matchup	Score	Attendance	Broadcasters
Opening Round – Thursday, April 26
7:00 pm	Ohio State vs. King	3-0 (25–13, 25–23, 25–18)	1,023	Charlie Danis & Hanna Williford (BTN+)
Quarterfinals – Tuesday, May 1
8:00 pm	UC Irvine vs. Ohio State	2–3 (19–25, 25–22, 23–25, 25–22, 14–16)	1,691	Darren Preston & Denny Cline (P12+ UCLA)
11:05 pm	UCLA vs.Harvard	3–1 (23–25, 25–21, 25–11, 25–21)	1,691	Darren Preston & Denny Cline (P12+ UCLA)
Semifinals – Thursday, May 3
8:00 pm	Long Beach State vs. Ohio State	3–1 (25–22, 25–23, 25–27, 32–30)	4,249	Lincoln Rose (NCAA.com)
10:30 pm	BYU vs. UCLA	1–3 (22–25, 26–24, 27–29, 19–25)	4,249	Lincoln Rose (NCAA.com)
National Championship – Saturday, May 5
7:00 pm	Long Beach State vs. UCLA	3–2 (25–19, 23–25, 20–25, 26–24, 15–12)	7,248	Paul Sunderland and Kevin Barnett (ESPN2)
Game times are ET. Rankings denote tournament seeding.

== All-Tournament Team ==
- TJ DeFalco – Long Beach State
- Kyle Ensing – Long Beach State
- Daenan Gyimah – UCLA
- Jake Hanes – Ohio State
- Micah Maʻa – UCLA
- Nicolas Szerszeń – Ohio State
- Josh Tuaniga – Long Beach State (Most Outstanding Player)
