= National Intercollegiate Rugby Association =

- Abbreviation: NIRA
- Formation: 2015; 11 years ago
- Legal status: Association
- Region served: United States
- Official language: English
- Commissioner: Amy Rusert
- Main organ: Board of Directors
- Website: nira.rugby

The National Intercollegiate Rugby Association (NIRA) is a governing body of National Collegiate Athletic Association (NCAA) collegiate women's rugby programs in the United States founded in 2015.

== History ==
The NIRA traces roots back to 2015 when eight NCAA member institutions formed the National Collegiate Varsity Women's Rugby Association (NCVWRA) to organize collegiate competition and aid in the promotion of rugby at the varsity level in the NCAA after rugby was promoted to Emerging Sport status.

Inaugural members of the association included Army, Bowdoin, Brown, Central Washington, Harvard, Norwich, Quinnipiac, and West Chester. Membership in the organization is limited to NCAA institutions who sponsor women's rugby at the varsity level. In 2016 the association became known as the National Intercollegiate Rugby Association (NIRA).

== Members ==
As of May, 2026:

=== Division I ===
Club	Location	Nickname	Type	Joined	Coach
Army West Point	West Point, New York	Black Knights	Service Academy	2018	Jenn Salomon-Clayton
Brown University	Providence, Rhode Island	Bears	Private	2018	Rosalind Chou
Dartmouth College	Hanover, New Hampshire	Big Green	Private	2018	Katie Dowty
Harvard University	Cambridge, Massachusetts	Crimson	Private	2018	Mel Denham
La Salle University	Philadelphia, Pennsylvania	Explorers	Private	2025	Kelsie McDowell
Lindenwood University	St. Charles, Missouri	Lions	Private	2024	Trevor Locke
Long Island University	Brooklyn / Brookville, NY	Sharks	Private	2018	Dee Nash
Mount St. Mary's University	Emmitsburg, Maryland	Mountaineers	Private	2018	Maggie Myles
Navy	Annapolis, Maryland	Midshipmen	Service Academy	2023	Murph McCarthy
Princeton University	Princeton, New Jersey	Tigers	Private	2022	Josie Ziluca
Queens University of Charlotte	Charlotte, North Carolina	Royals	Private	2023	Danny Harlow
Quinnipiac University	Hamden, Connecticut	Bobcats	Private	2018	Becky Carlson
Sacred Heart University	Fairfield, Connecticut	Pioneers	Private	2018	Michelle Reed

=== Division II ===
Club	Location	Nickname	Type	Joined	Coach
American International College	Springfield, Massachusetts	Yellow Jackets	Private	2018	Denver Divens
Davenport University	Michigan	Panthers	Private	2022	Greg Teliczan
Emory and Henry University	Emory, Virginia	Wasps	Private	2023	Tom O'Neill
Frostburg State University	Frostburg, Maryland	Bobcats	Public	2023	Jeff Horton
University of New Haven	West Haven, Connecticut	Chargers	Private	2021	Emily Record
West Chester University	Chester County, Pennsylvania	Golden Rams	Public	2018	Tony Deremer

=== Division III ===
Club	Location	Nickname	Type	Joined	Coach
Bowdoin College	Brunswick, Maine	Polar Bears	Private	2018	Laura Miller
Guilford College	Greensboro, North Carolina	Quakers	Private	2020	Christine Newcomb
Thomas College	Waterville, Maine	Terriers	Private	2025	Farrah Douglas
University of New England	Biddeford, Maine	Nor'easters	Private	2018	Ashley Potvin-Fulford
Warren Wilson College	Swannanoa, NC	Owls	Private	2023	Angelica Rodriguez

== Championship finals ==
=== Division I ===
Ed.	Year	Winner	Score	Runner-up	Ref.
1	2015	Quinnipiac (1)	24–19	Army	
2	2016	Quinnipiac (2)	46–24	Central Washington	
3	2017	Quinnipiac (3)	29–20	Dartmouth	
4	2018	Dartmouth (1)	19–14	Harvard	
5	2019	Harvard (1)	18–7	Army	
6	2020	(not held due to COVID-19 pandemic)			
7	2021	Dartmouth (2)	28–18	Army	
8	2022	Dartmouth (3)	15–10	Harvard	
9	2023	Harvard (2)	20–12	Dartmouth	
10	2024	Harvard (3)	19–12	Dartmouth	
11	2025	Harvard (4)	22–19	Lindenwood	

=== Division II ===
- 2025 – American International 74–0 West Chester
- 2024 – American International 20–15 Davenport
- 2023 – Davenport 91–5 Lander
- 2022 – Queens 34–27 Davenport
- 2021 – American International 29–17 West Chester
- 2019 – West Chester 15–14 Brown
- 2018 – Mount St. Mary's 22–15 Sacred Heart
- 2017 – University of New England 57–14 Bowdoin
- 2016 – Bowdoin College 32–22 University of New England

=== Division III ===
- 2023 – Bowdoin 51–17 Adrian
- 2022 – Bowdoin 29–0 University of New England
- 2021 – Bowdoin 31–12 University of New England
- 2019 – Bowdoin College 27–5 University of New England
