= Mohler =

Mohler or Möhler is a surname. Notable people with the surname include:

- Albert Mohler (born 1959), American theologian
- Albert Mohler (footballer), Swiss footballer
- Armin Mohler (1920–2003), Swiss philosopher and journalist
- Billy Mohler, Grammy-nominated producer, songwriter, and multi-instrumentalist
- Carl C. Mohler (1898–1969), American politician
- Dana Mohler-Faria, president of Bridgewater State University
- Don Mohler, American politician and former educator
- James L. Mohler, urologist
- Johann Adam Möhler (1796–1838), 19th century German theologian
- Mary Mohler (born 1984), American former competition swimmer
- Mike Mohler (born 1968), American former professional baseball player
- Nora Mohler (1898–1984), American physicist
- Orville Mohler (1909–1949), American football and baseball player
