= Earhart Hall =

Residential hall at Purdue University, Indiana, US

Coordinates: 40.425829°N 86.924963°W

Earhart hall
- Purdue University
- Location: 1275 First Street, West Lafayette, Indiana
- Established: 1964
- Named after: Amelia Earhart
- Sister college: Shreve Hall
- Website: Earhart Hall – Main

Earhart Hall is one of the sixteen residential halls within Purdue University in Indiana, located on 1275 First Street, facing First Street Tower and behind Shreve Hall. It is officially named after the famous aviator Amelia Earhart. The official club of Earhart Hall is known as the Itasca Club, named after the ship that last heard from Earhart.

== History ==
Earhart Hall opened in 1964. This building was constructed by Walter Scholer and Associates. Amelia Earhart first came to Purdue University when the campus had enrollment of only 4,700 students. She joined the Purdue staff in 1936 and resided in a fully female residence hall which is now known as Duhme Hall in Windsor Halls. She began her association with the university as a consultant in careers for women and as a technical advisor to the Department of Aeronautics. This 8-story residence hall was named after her.

== Amenities ==
Earhart Hall is a fully air-conditioned residence hall that provides its residents with many services. Earhart is equipped with multiple study lounges throughout the building including one study room on each floor. The central connecting portion of the hall contains three lounges. One for quiet study, group meeting or recreational activities such as watching movies on the big screen. The main floor also has vending machines, microwaves, an ice machine, two kitchenettes and two computers with a printing station. It also has a grand piano in the formal main lounge. The main office is open 24 hours a day and provides a variety of student services. In the basement, there is a large laundry room with plenty of washers and dryers. There are also two lounges in the basement. One with a big TV and other one is a study lounge.

== The Itasca Club ==
Named after the last ship that heard from Amelia Earhart, the Itasca Club is Earhart Hall's official resident club. It is a student organization whose purpose is to encourage scholastic achievement and to promote different kinds of activities. The club is also a representative body that serves as the hall's student government. It provides many social and educational opportunities throughout the year, including paintball trips, a breakout bash and much more. The activities put on by the club are decided by the residents of the hall. Also available to hall residents is a large DVD library with items they can check out for a day, free of charge. A pool table, ping pong table, air hockey and foosball are situated in the recreational lounge of the hall.

== Earhart Hall’s Dining Court ==
Earhart Dining Court is open to all Purdue students, faculty, staff and visitors. Anyone can eat here using their using meal swipes, Dining Dollars, BoilerExpress, or credit card for breakfast, lunch, and dinner. The dining court features stations such as Asian and Italian where students can create their own dishes, a salad bar and a pastry shop. It also has an On-The-Go station where students can pick up food to carry out during school days.
