= Engineering Fountain =

Coordinates: 40.42864°N 86.91378°W

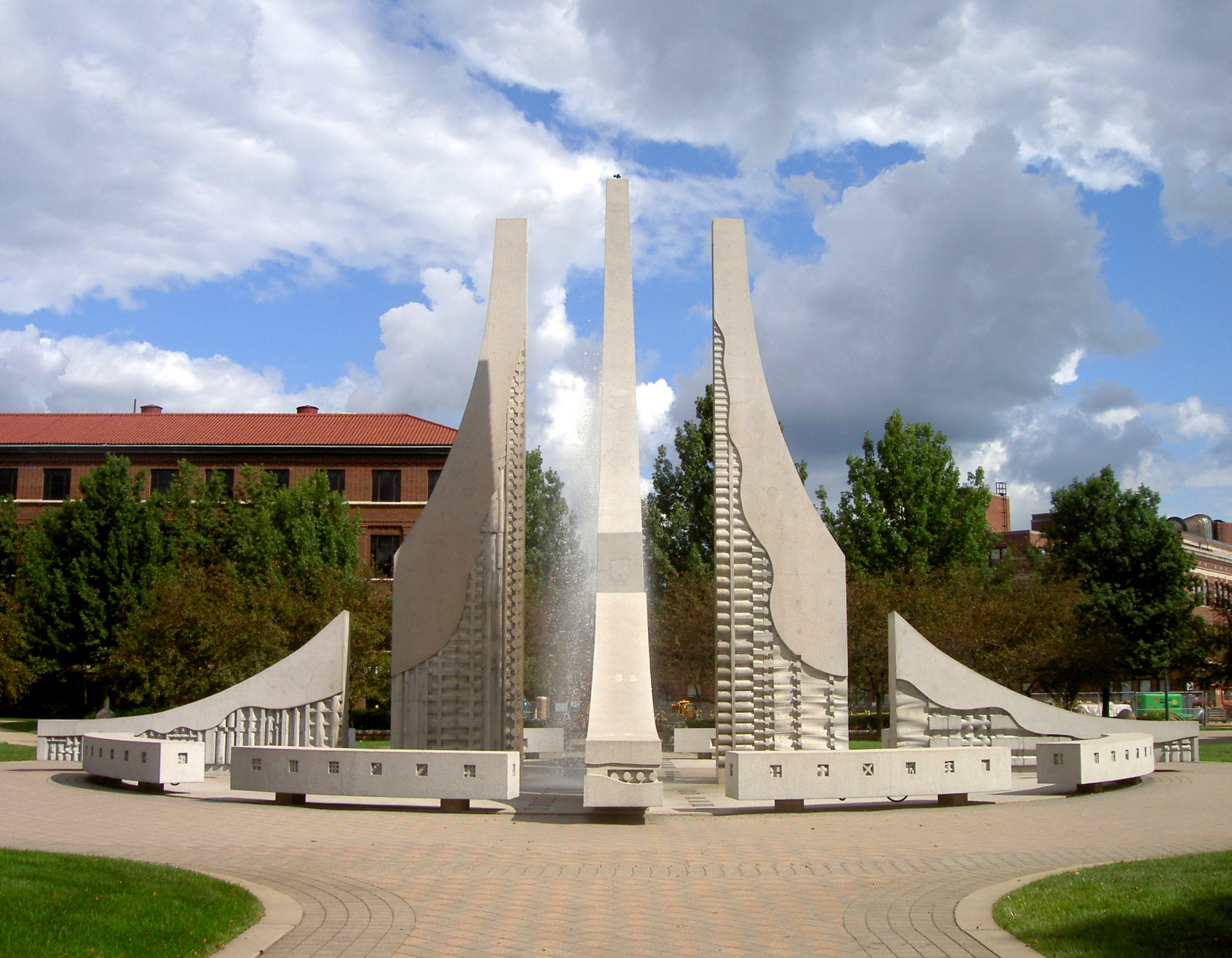
- Artist: Robert Youngman
- Year: 1989
- Type: Concrete fountain
- Dimensions: 11.58 m (38 ft)
- Owner: Purdue University

The Purdue Mall Water Sculpture, often referred to as the Engineering Fountain, is a water sculpture and fountain located at the main campus of Purdue University in West Lafayette, Indiana. The sculpture is positioned in the heart of campus on the Purdue Mall. Designed by Robert Youngman, the fountain was a gift from the class of 1939 and as a result of its benefactors, the fountain is also known as the Class of 1939 Water Sculpture.

== Description ==
The fountain has four vertical parabolic structures with a large jet of water spraying up through the center. It is surrounded by benches that can be used by visitors to enjoy the fountain. It stands 38 feet tall and is made of 228 tons of concrete. The fountain has neither a fence around it nor a pool to collect the water. Rather, the water drains though a metal grate set into the ground underneath it. A later addition to the fountain is a mirrored steel cylinder around the jet.

== Background ==
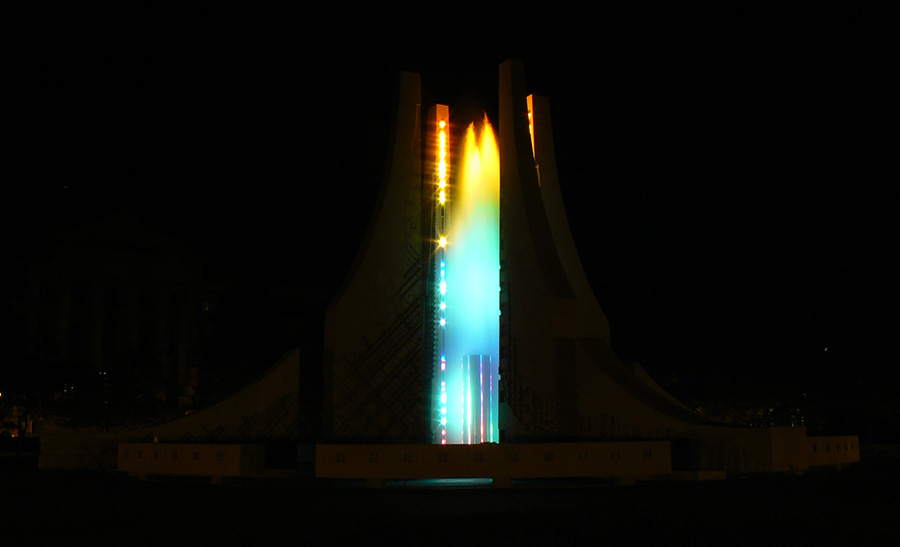
The sculpture illuminated at night

The idea for the design was sketched on a napkin when Robert Youngman was at a casual meeting over coffee in the Purdue Memorial Union. Youngman was a professor at the University of Illinois and completed a large number of concrete sculptures between 1962 and 1995. The fountain was officially dedicated to the university in 1989 during homecoming on the fiftieth anniversary of the class of 1939. Taresah Youngman, Robert's daughter, assisted in the project. Jones & Phillips Associates, Inc.(Architectural and Specialty Lighting designers) worked with sculptor Youngman to create a series of lighting effects and a twenty-minute lighting program orchestrated to the fountain water show. The fountain runs from the second week in April through the end of October or as weather permits. The total cost of the fountain is believed to be around $350,000.

== General information ==
The fountain is the iconic center of the Purdue Mall, which is often informally referred as the Engineering Mall due to the proximity of the engineering-related buildings around it. Originally built with an open jet that shoots 588 gallons of water per minute straight up into the air, students soon created the tradition of running through the fountain on warm days. In 2001, a mirrored cylinder was installed around the jet at Youngman's suggestion to prevent potential injuries incurred during fountain runs. This cylinder has not stopped students from participating in the tradition of a fountain run on warm days after class or after the summer graduation ceremonies.
