= Purdue University =

Public university in Indiana, US

- Former name: Indiana Agricultural College (1865–1869) (Note: The name the Indiana State Legislature used when discussing the then-future university prior to its naming after John Purdue.)
- Type: Public land-grant research university
- Established: May 6, 1869; 157 years ago
- Founder: John Purdue
- Parent institution: Purdue University System
- Accreditation: HLC
- Academic affiliations: AAU; ORAU; URA; Sea-grant; Space-grant
- Endowment: $4.44 billion (2024)
- President: Mitch Daniels
- Provost: Patrick J. Wolfe
- Faculty: 3,193 (fall 2025)
- Students: 57,876 (fall 2025)
- Undergraduates: 43,633 (fall 2025)
- Postgraduates: 14,243 (fall 2025)
- Location: West Lafayette, Indiana Indianapolis, Indiana, United States; 40°25′30″N 86°55′23″W
- Campus: 2,660 acres (10.8 km^{2}); Small city
- Newspaper: Purdue Exponent
- Colors: Old gold and black
- Nickname: Boilermakers
- Sporting affiliations: NCAA Division I FBS – Big Ten
- Mascots: Boilermaker Special; Purdue Pete
- Website: purdue.edu

Purdue University is a public land-grant research university, with its main campus in West Lafayette, Indiana, United States, and an urban campus in Indianapolis. The university was founded in 1869 after Lafayette businessman John Purdue donated land and money to establish a college of science, technology, and agriculture; the first classes were held on September 16, 1874. Purdue's West Lafayette campus remains the flagship campus of the Purdue University system, while Purdue University in Indianapolis was launched on July 1, 2024.

Purdue University is a member of the Association of American Universities and is classified among "R1: Doctoral Universities – Very high research activity". Purdue enrolls the largest student body of any individual university campus in Indiana, as well as the ninth-largest foreign student population of any university in the United States. The university is home to the world's oldest computer science degree-granting department and the first university-owned airport in the United States.

Purdue is the founding member of the Big Ten Conference and sponsors 18 intercollegiate sports teams. It has been affiliated with 13 Nobel laureates, 1 Turing Award laureate, 1 Bharat Ratna recipient, (Note: C. N. R. Rao (PhD 1958) was awarded Bharat Ratna, the highest civilian award of the Republic of India in 2013.) 27 astronauts, 2 World Food Prize laureates, 3 Pulitzer Prize winners, 18 Olympic medalists, 3 National Medal of Technology and Innovation recipients, 2 National Medal of Science recipients, 3 Presidential Medal of Freedom recipients, 7 members of Congress, 3 U.S. governors, and 2 heads of state.

== History ==
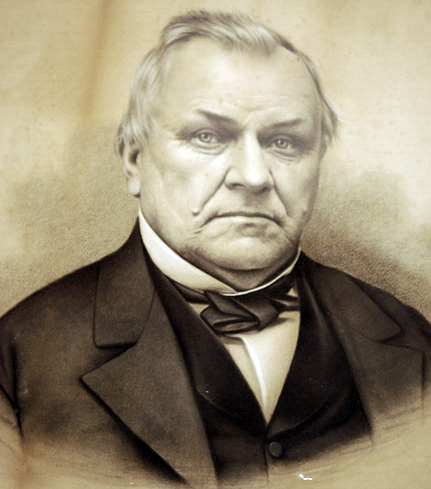
John Purdue, the university's eponymous benefactor

In 1865, the Indiana General Assembly voted to take advantage of the Morrill Land-Grant Colleges Act of 1862 and began plans to establish an institution with a focus on agriculture and engineering with the preliminary name of the Indiana Agricultural College. Communities throughout the state offered facilities and funding in bids for the location of the new college. Popular proposals included designating Indiana University or what is now Butler University as Indiana's land-grant, as well as the addition of an agriculture department at what is now Indiana State University. By 1869, Tippecanoe County's offer included $150,000 (equivalent to $3.6 million in 2025) from Lafayette business leader and philanthropist John Purdue; $50,000 from the county; and 100 acres (0.4 km^{2}) of land from John Purdue and local residents.

On May 6, 1869, the General Assembly established the institution in Tippecanoe County as Purdue University, in the name of the principal benefactor. Classes began at Purdue on September 16, 1874, with six instructors and 39 students. Professor John S. Hougham was Purdue's first faculty member and was the acting president between the administrations of presidents Shortridge and White. A campus of five buildings was completed by the end of 1874. In 1875, Sarah D. Allen Oren Haynes, the State Librarian of Indiana, was appointed professor of botany.

Purdue issued its first degree, a Bachelor of Science in chemistry, in 1875. The first female student was admitted that autumn.

Emerson E. White, the university's president from 1876 to 1883, followed a strict interpretation of the Morrill Act. Rather than emulate the classical universities, White believed Purdue should be an "industrial college" and devote its resources toward providing a broad, liberal education with an emphasis on science, technology, and agriculture.

Part of White's plan to distinguish Purdue from classical universities included a controversial attempt to ban fraternities, which was ultimately overturned by the Indiana Supreme Court. White resigned in protest. The next president, James H. Smart, is remembered for his call in 1894 to rebuild the original Heavilon Hall "one brick higher" after it had been destroyed by a fire.

By the end of the nineteenth century, the university was organized into schools of agriculture, engineering (mechanical, civil, and electrical), and pharmacy; former U.S. President Benjamin Harrison was on the board of trustees. Purdue's engineering laboratories included testing facilities for a locomotive, and for a Corliss steam engine—one of the most efficient engines of the time. Programs in education and home economics were soon established, as well as a short-lived school of medicine. By 1925, Purdue had the largest undergraduate engineering enrollment in the country, a status it would keep for half a century.

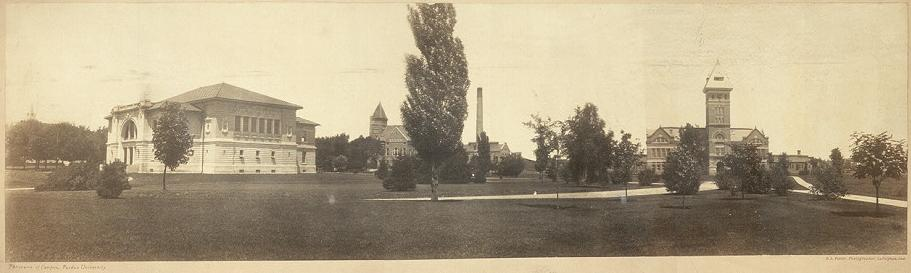
Purdue University, 1904

President Edward C. Elliott oversaw a campus building program between the world wars. Inventor, alumnus, and trustee David E. Ross coordinated several fundraisers, donated lands to the university, and was instrumental in establishing the Purdue Research Foundation. Ross's gifts and fundraisers supported such projects as Ross–Ade Stadium, the Memorial Union, a civil engineering surveying camp, and Purdue University Airport. Purdue Airport was the country's first university-owned airport and the site of the country's first college-credit flight training courses.

Amelia Earhart joined the Purdue faculty in 1935 as a consultant for these flight courses and as a counselor on women's careers. Earhart lived in Women's Residence Hall South, now Duhme Hall, part of Windsor Halls. In 1936, the Purdue Research Foundation provided the funds for the Lockheed Electra 10-E Earhart flew on her attempted round-the-world flight.

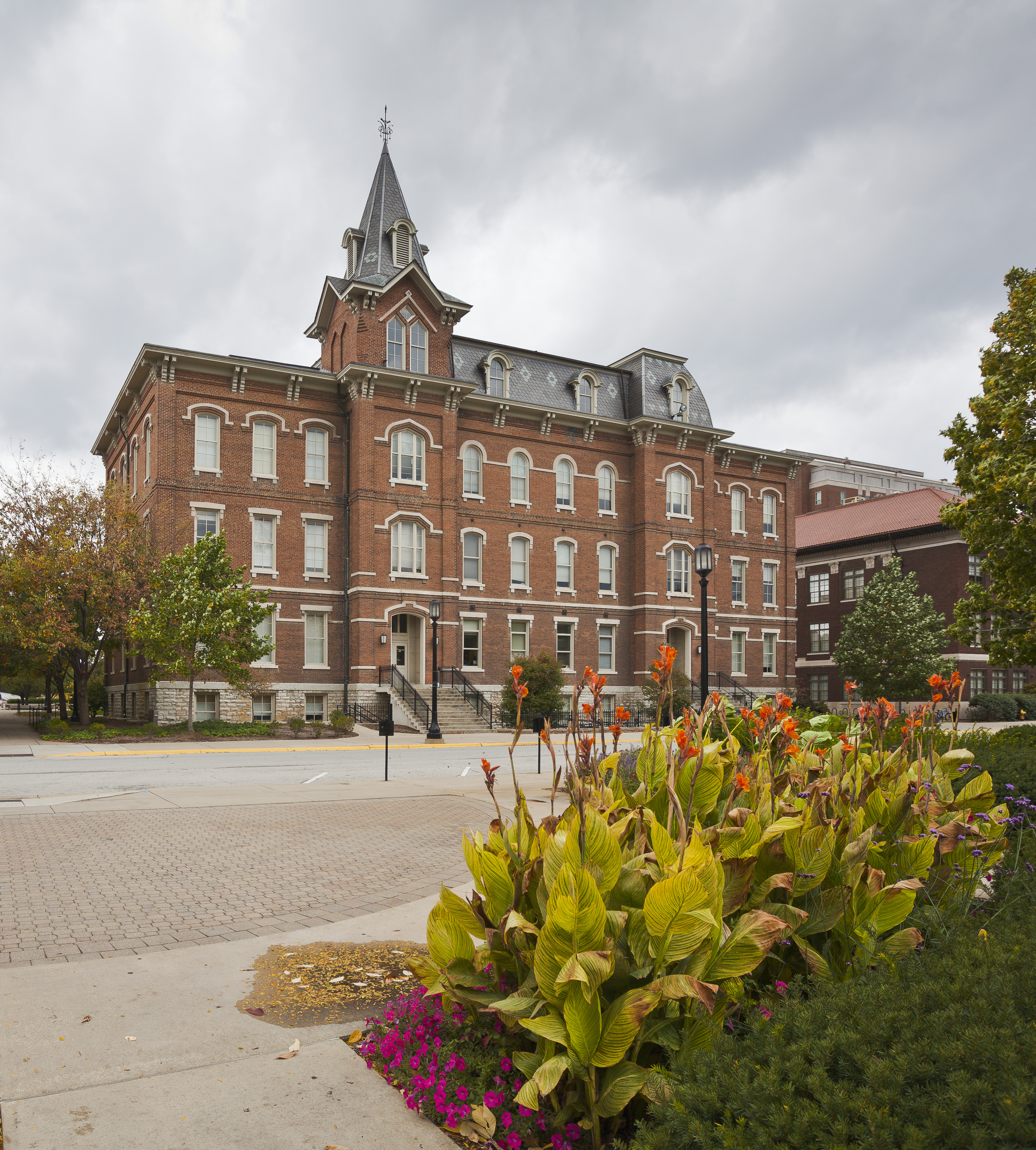
University Hall

Every school and department at the university was involved in some type of military research or training during World War II. During a project on radar receivers, Purdue physicists discovered properties of germanium that led to the making of the first transistor. The Army and the Navy conducted training programs at Purdue and more than 17,500 students, staff, and alumni served in the armed forces. Purdue set up about a hundred centers throughout Indiana to train skilled workers for defense industries. As veterans returned to the university under the G.I. Bill, first-year classes were taught at some of these sites to alleviate the demand for campus space. Four of these sites are now degree-granting regional campuses of the Purdue University system. On-campus housing became racially desegregated in 1947.

After the war, a decade-long construction program emphasized science and research. In the late 1950s and early 1960s the university established programs in veterinary medicine, industrial management, and nursing, as well as the first computer science department in the United States. Undergraduate humanities courses were strengthened, graduate-level study in these areas was slowly established. Purdue awarded its first Bachelor of Arts degrees in 1960.

The official seal of Purdue was officially inaugurated during the university's centennial in 1969. Consisting of elements from emblems that had been used unofficially since the 1890s, the current seal depicts a griffin, symbolizing strength, and a three-part shield, representing education, research, and service.

In 1975, Purdue University joined ARPANET, an early packet-switching network that would ultimately become the foundation for the modern internet.

In recent years, Purdue's leaders have continued to support high-tech research and international programs. In 1987, U.S. President Ronald Reagan visited the West Lafayette campus to give a speech about the influence of technological progress on job creation.

In the 1990s, the university added more opportunities to study abroad and expanded its course offerings in world languages and cultures. The first buildings of the Discovery Park interdisciplinary research center were dedicated in 2004.

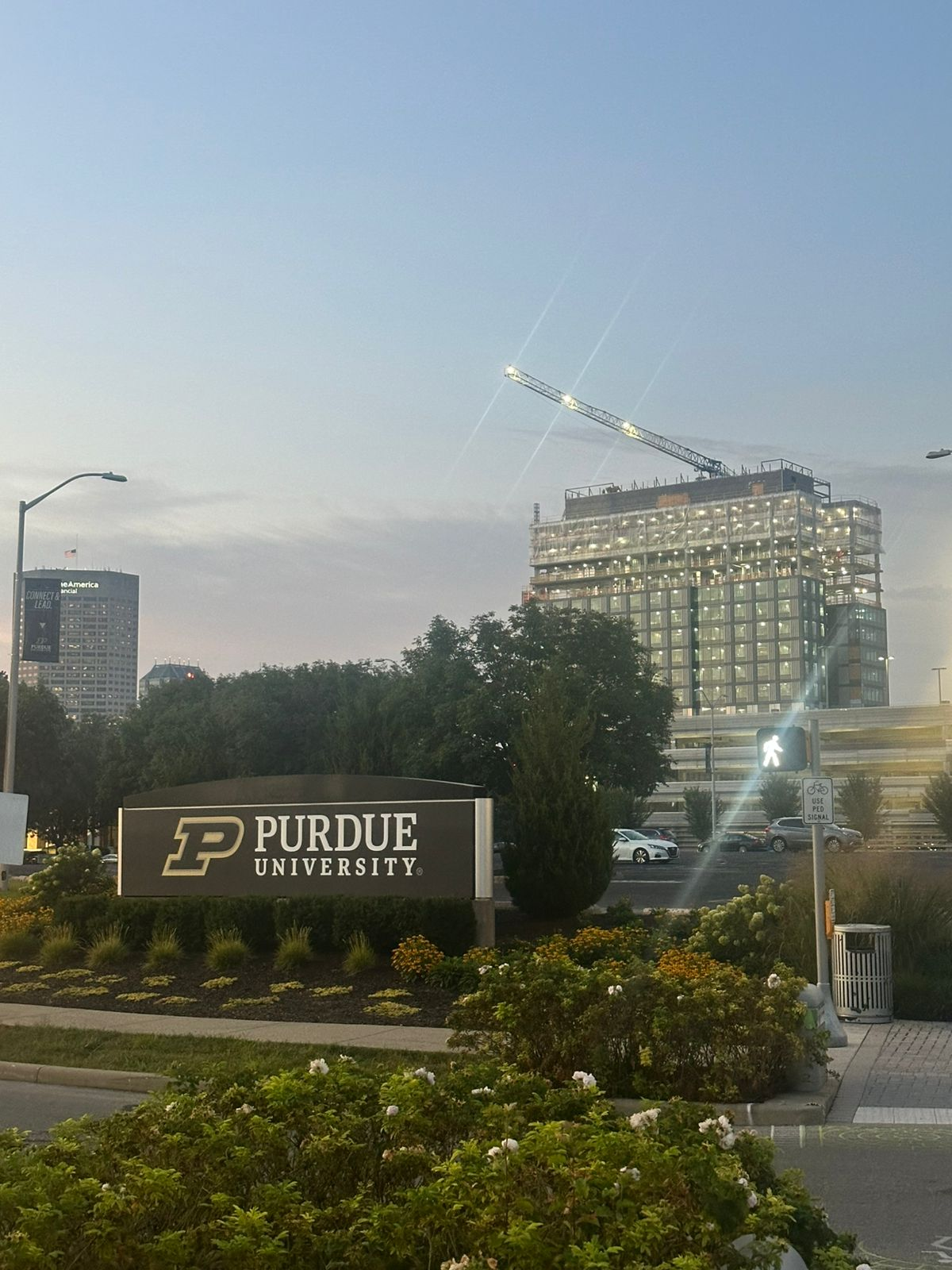
Purdue University signage at Blackford Street with Academic Success Building in the Background

On April 27, 2017, Purdue University announced plans to acquire for-profit college Kaplan University and convert it to a public university in the state of Indiana, subject to multiple levels of approval. That school now operates as Purdue University Global, and aims to serve adult learners.

On July 1, 2024, Purdue launched Purdue University in Indianapolis, an extension of the West Lafayette campus, after the formal split of Indiana University–Purdue University Indianapolis. It conveys Purdue West Lafayette degrees and has the same academic rigor as the flagship campus. Purdue currently has a 28-acre (11 ha) footprint in downtown Indianapolis that includes space in the existing engineering and technology buildings, and has established partnerships with companies for facilities and shared spaces throughout the metro area.

=== Integration ===
Purdue had black graduates by the 1890s, and in 1905, a Black man ran for its track team. However, the teams became segregated some time in the 1910s and remained so until a student protest in 1947. Black students were not allowed to live in the residence halls until the 1940s. Black males were able to live in cooperatives, but Black females were not allowed to live anywhere in West Lafayette. In 1946, the women's dormitories were integrated by an order of the governor of Indiana.

In 1955, Dolores Cooper Shockley became the first African-American woman to earn a doctorate in pharmacology in the U.S.

Helen Williams became the first Black faculty member in 1968.

Carolyn Peck became the first African-American woman to coach a team to the NCAA Division I women's basketball tournament national championship.

=== Trump era ===
In 2025, in response to state-level executive orders aligning with directives issued by President Donald Trump, the university terminated its Office of Diversity, Inclusion and Belonging, saying that staff who had been a part of that office would have the chance to interview for current vacancies in other areas. The university also terminated the Recruitment and Diversity Office for the Polytechnic Institute, despite diversity only being a small part of the office's function. Terminated staff members believed that it was because of the name alone that the office was terminated, as other recruitment offices for different parts of the university that did not have "diversity" in the name had remained untouched. Following a letter from the United States House Select Committee on Strategic Competition between the United States and the Chinese Communist Party, the university was reported to reject applications from students from China, Russia, Iran, Venezuela, Cuba and North Korea as part of an unwritten policy.

In June of that year, the Indiana General Assembly passed a state budget bill mandating that Indiana's public universities phase out programs that produce fewer than a certain number of graduates over a three-year period. As a result, Purdue eliminated or merged a number of master's and Ph.D. programs in areas such as microbiology, mathematics, and literature.

== Campuses ==
=== West Lafayette ===
Purdue's West Lafayette campus is situated in the city of West Lafayette, near the western bank of the Wabash River, across which sits the larger city of Lafayette. Mitch Daniels Boulevard (formerly State Street) divides the northern and southern portions of campus. Academic buildings are mostly concentrated on the eastern and southern parts of campus, with residence halls and intramural fields to the west, and athletic facilities to the north. An extensive system of underground tunnels protects pedestrians from snow, ice, wind, rain and UV during movements between buildings.

==== Purdue Mall ====
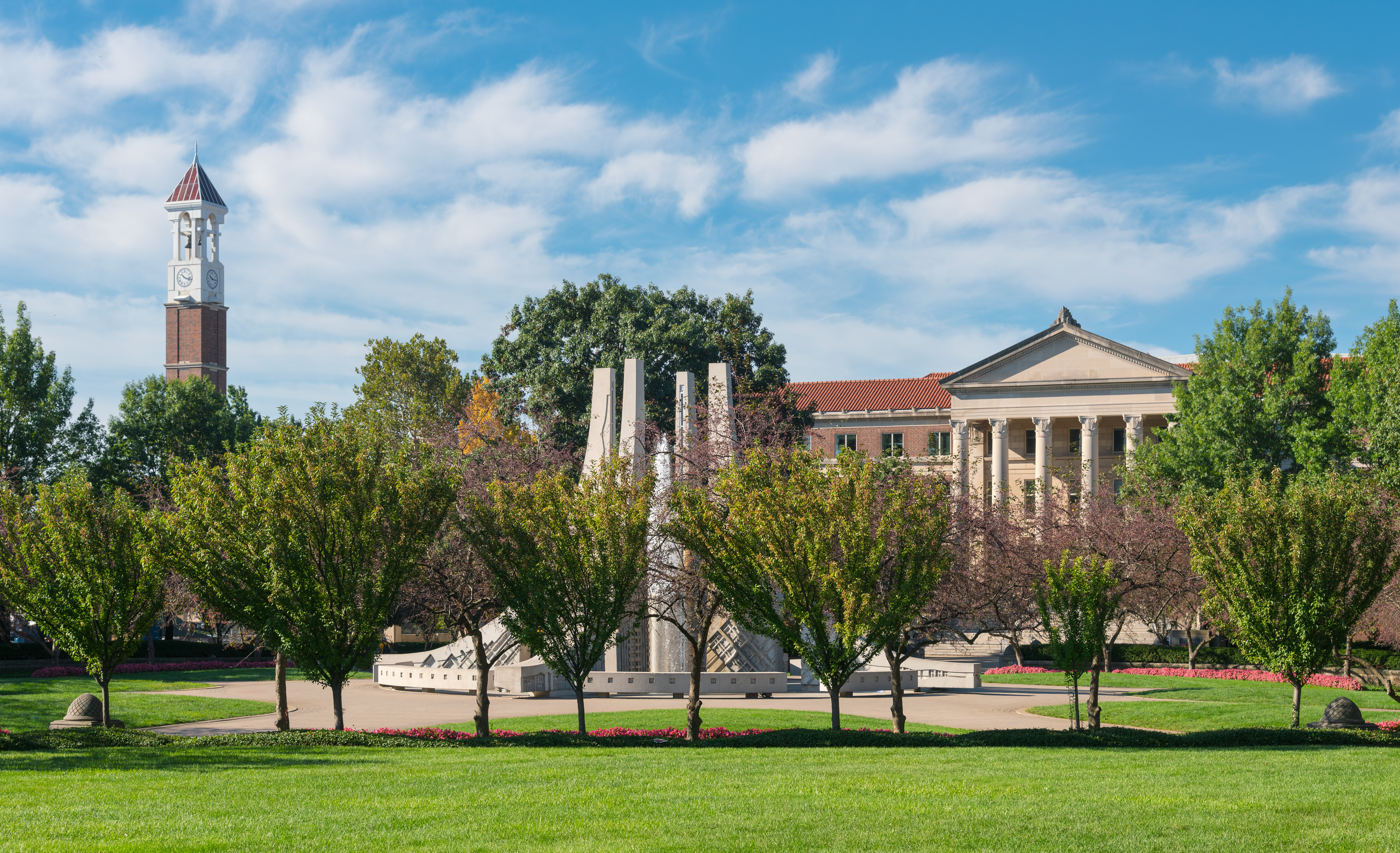
Purdue Mall, showing the Engineering Fountain, Purdue Bell Tower, and Hovde Hall

The Purdue Mall is the central quad of Purdue University and was created to connect the academic campus with Ross-Ade Stadium. It is also known as the Engineering Mall due to its proximity to several engineering buildings. The most prominent feature of the Purdue Mall is the 38-foot (12 m)-tall concrete Engineering Fountain.

The Purdue Bell Tower is between the Stadium and Centennial Malls. The Bell Tower is considered an icon of the university and can be found on many Purdue logos and those of the cities of Lafayette and West Lafayette.

Southwest of the Stadium Mall is the Edward C. Elliott Hall of Music, one of the largest proscenium theaters in the world. Elliott Hall of Music is the home of the WBAA (AM) and WBAA-FM studios, and was the base of operations for Purdue Bands and Orchestras until the completion of the Marc and Sharon Hagle Hall in 2022.

West of the Elliott Hall of Music is the Armory Building. The Armory Building was rebuilt in 1918 after a fire and houses the university's ROTC programs and other clubs.

==== Memorial Mall ====
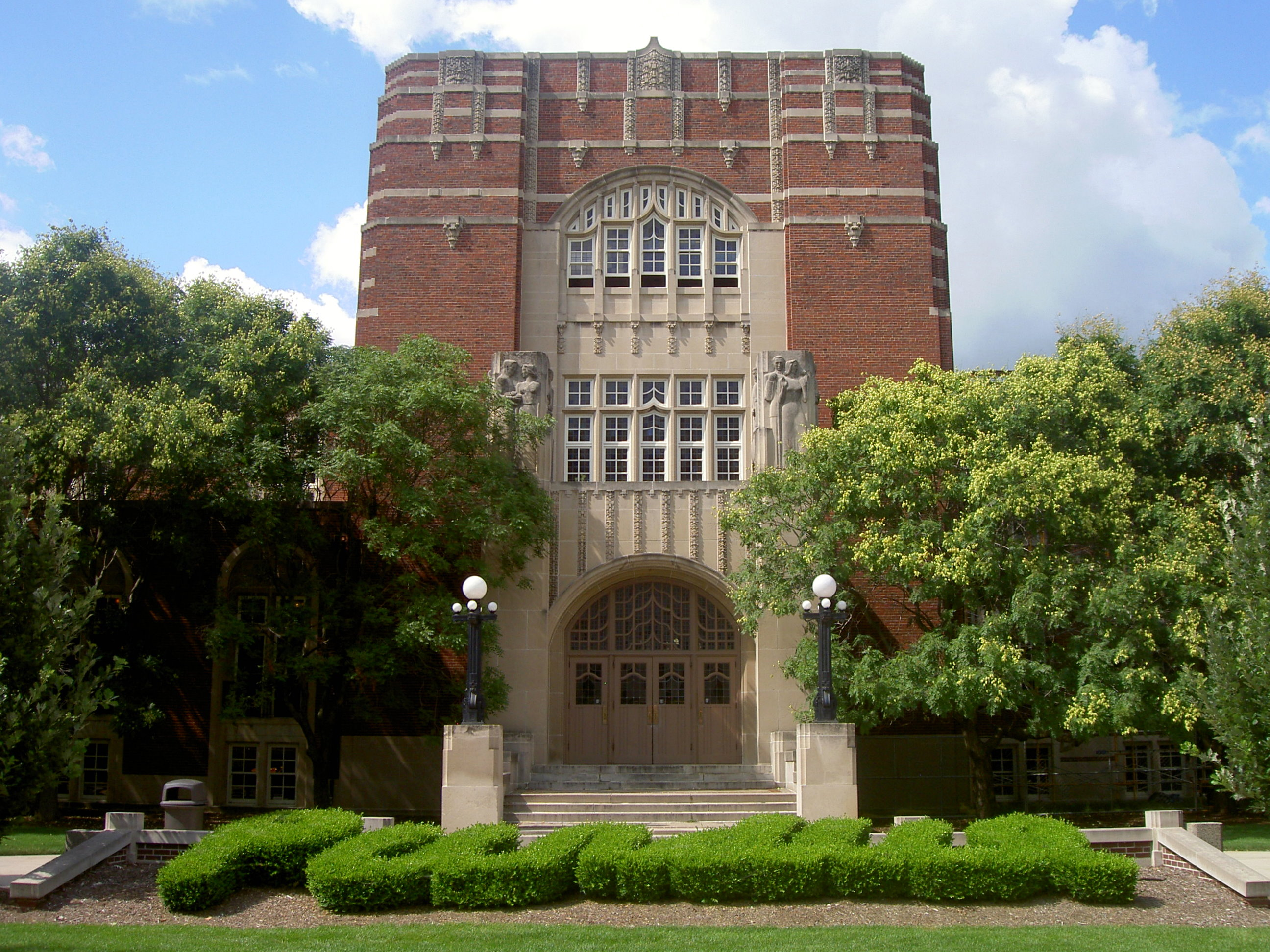
Purdue Memorial Union

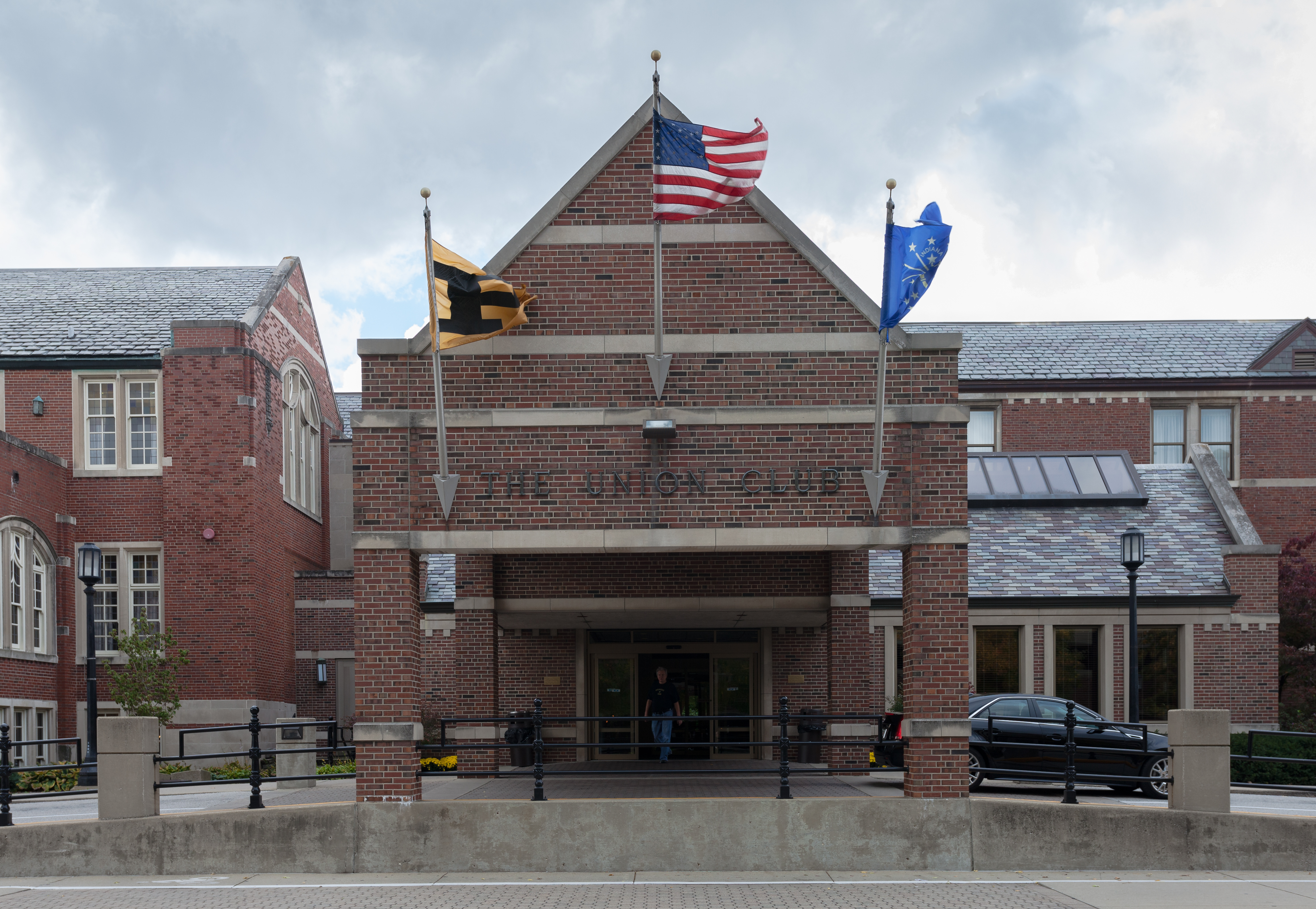
Union Club

The Purdue Memorial Mall, south of the Purdue Mall, is the original section of campus. It is a popular meeting place for students and is surrounded by other buildings used for academic and cultural purposes.

Near this section of campus is Felix Haas Hall, which was constructed in 1909 as Memorial Gymnasium in memory of the 17 Purdue University football players, coaches, alumni, and fans who died in the Purdue Wreck railroad accident of 1903. The structure was renovated in 1985 to house the computer science department. In 2006, it was renamed in honor of retired Provost Felix Haas and began to also house the Statistics department. East of the Memorial Mall is the Purdue Memorial Union, Purdue's student union building, and the adjacent Union Club Hotel.

==== University Hall ====
University Hall is the only building remaining from the original six-building campus. Construction began in 1871, when the building was known as "The Main Building". The building was dedicated in 1877. University Hall originally housed the office of the president, a chapel, and classrooms. At the request of John Purdue, he was buried in the Memorial Mall, directly across from the main entrance of University Hall.

==== South Campus ====
The area south of Mitch Daniels Boulevard is home to Purdue's agricultural, fine arts, life sciences, and veterinary buildings. This area also includes the Krannert School of Management, Horticulture Gardens, Discovery Park, Lyles Porter Hall and the Purdue Airport.

Lyles Porter Hall houses interdisciplinary healthcare facilities and classroom space within the College of Health and Human Sciences as well as the West Lafayette branch of the Indiana University School of Medicine.

==== West Campus ====
The western portion of campus consists of student housing, dining, and recreation facilities. The Córdova Recreational Sports Center, built in 1957, is the first building in the nation created solely to serve university student recreational needs.

==== Stadium Avenue ====
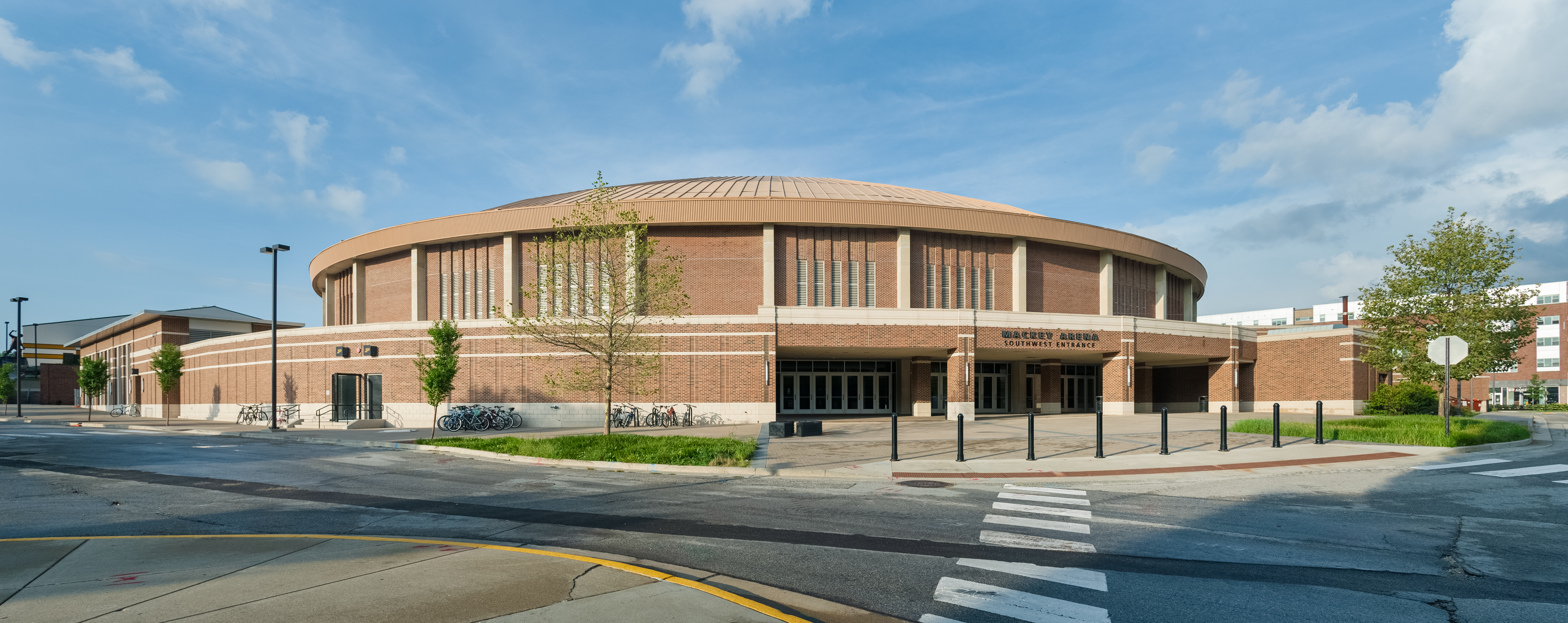
Mackey Arena

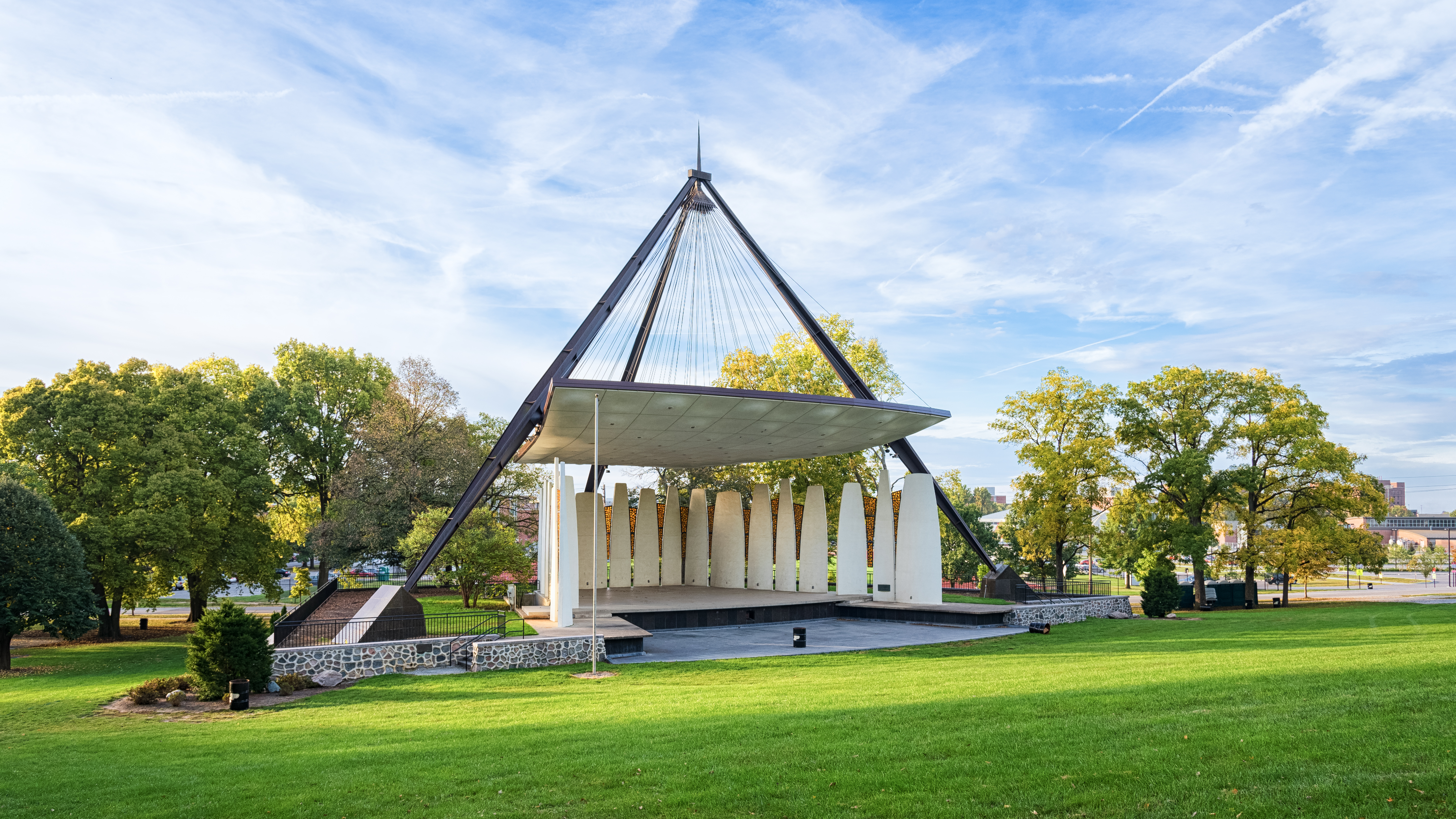
Slayter Center of Performing Arts

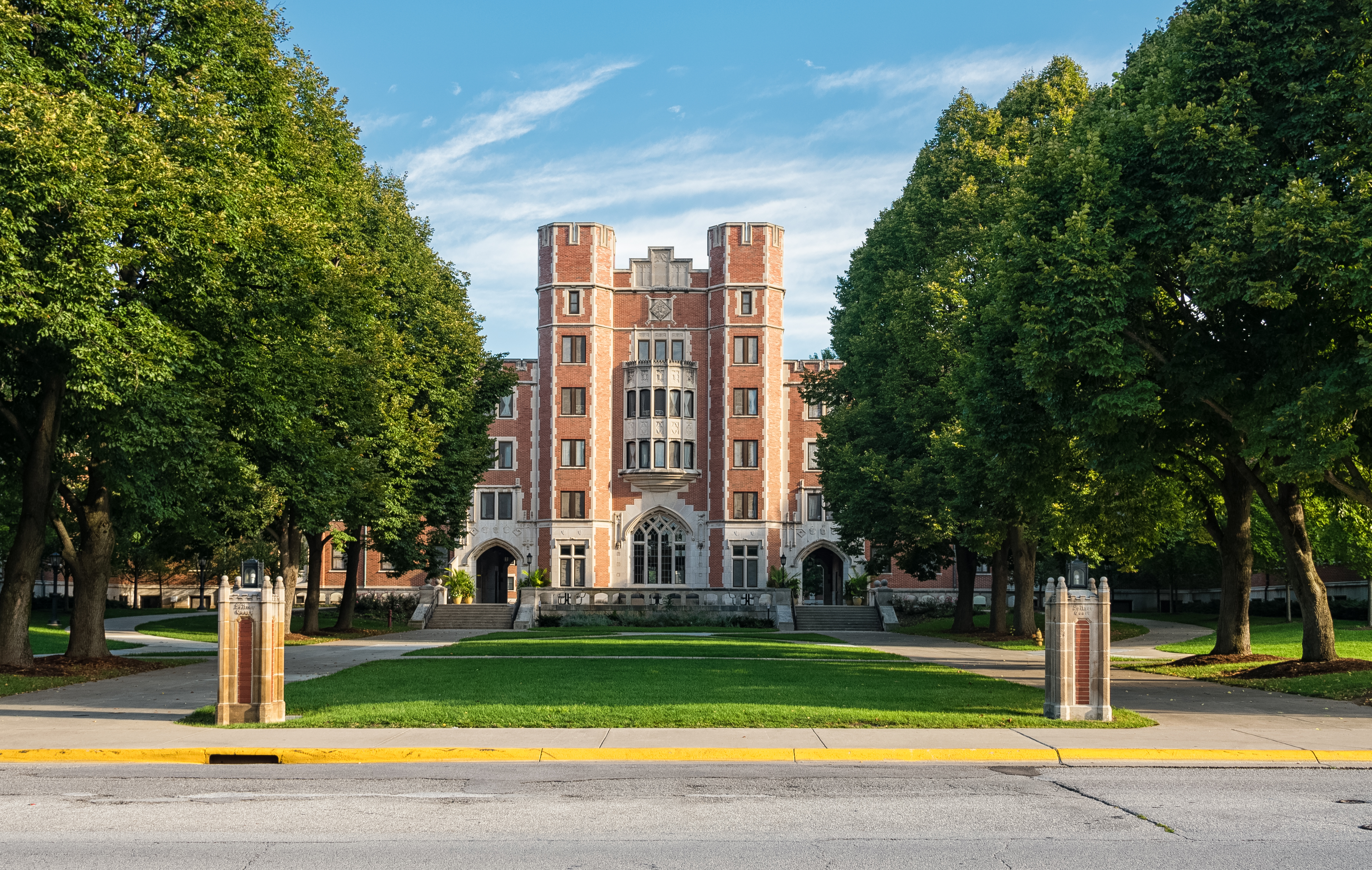
Cary Quadrangle

Much of the northern part of campus sits on land purchased for the university by industrialist David E. Ross and author George Ade in the 1920s. Many of Purdue's athletic facilities are there, including Ross–Ade Stadium (American football), Mackey Arena (basketball), and Lambert Fieldhouse (indoor track and field). This area also includes the Slayter Center of Performing Arts and Cary Quadrangle, one of the largest all-male housing units in the country.

=== Indianapolis ===
Purdue's Indianapolis campus is situated in downtown Indianapolis, occupying a 28-acre (11 ha) site that encompasses the northeastern portion of the former IUPUI campus and adjacent landholdings. The campus is located primarily between Michigan Street to the north, West Street to the west, and Indiana Avenue to the east.

Purdue initially leased five academic buildings and part of a residence hall from Indiana University Indianapolis following the establishment of its Indianapolis campus.

==== Student Center ====
The Purdue Student Center is located at 520 Indiana Avenue, on the eastern edge of Purdue University in Indianapolis's downtown campus. The two-story, 25,000-square-foot (2,300 m^{2}) facility was acquired by Purdue to provide a dedicated student hub for its Indianapolis location and opened in August 2025. The building includes study and collaboration spaces, student-success services, library services, a testing center, disability resources, and writing and academic-support facilities. It also provides social spaces where students can gather and interact outside the classroom.

==== Sigma Theta Tau Building ====
The Sigma Theta Tau Building (STT) is owned by the Sigma Theta Tau International Honor Society of Nursing, with Purdue University leasing approximately 15,800 square feet (1,470 m^{2}) of workplace space within the facility.

Purdue's leased space in the building is primarily used for administrative offices, student-facing services, and workplace space for faculty and staff who work between the Indianapolis and West Lafayette campuses. The building houses Purdue's Indianapolis office of the Center for Career Opportunities and other university administrative functions.

==== Shared facilities ====
Several facilities within the former IUPUI campus are shared by Purdue University and Indiana University Indianapolis. These include the Engineering and Technology Building, Innovation Hall, Science and Engineering Laboratory, Campus Center, and University Library. The shared facilities allow Purdue to provide academic and student services in Indianapolis while maintaining a physical presence within the larger university district that developed under IUPUI.

The Engineering and Technology Building is located along Michigan Street in the northern portion of the campus and provides classrooms, laboratories, offices, and instructional space for engineering and technology programs.

Innovation Hall is located along West Michigan Street and contains innovation and experiential-learning facilities, including the Indianapolis Makerspace. Its location near the western portion of the campus places it close to the downtown street network and surrounding commercial district.

The Science and Engineering Laboratory is located near the academic core and provides laboratory, classroom, and research space for science and engineering programs.

The Campus Center occupies a central location within the campus and provides dining, student services, gathering spaces, and facilities for student organizations and activities.

The University Library is located in the central portion of the campus and provides library collections, study areas, research resources, and academic services for students and faculty of both universities.

==== Industry and research partnerships ====
Purdue also maintains an extended presence beyond its 28-acre downtown campus through partnerships and shared facilities with industry. The university has established spaces for faculty and students at partner facilities throughout the Indianapolis metropolitan area. Purdue's motorsports engineering program is based at Dallara's U.S. headquarters in Speedway, Indiana, while its radiopharmaceutical manufacturing graduate program is housed at the SpectronRx facility on the north side of Indianapolis.

== Organization and administration ==
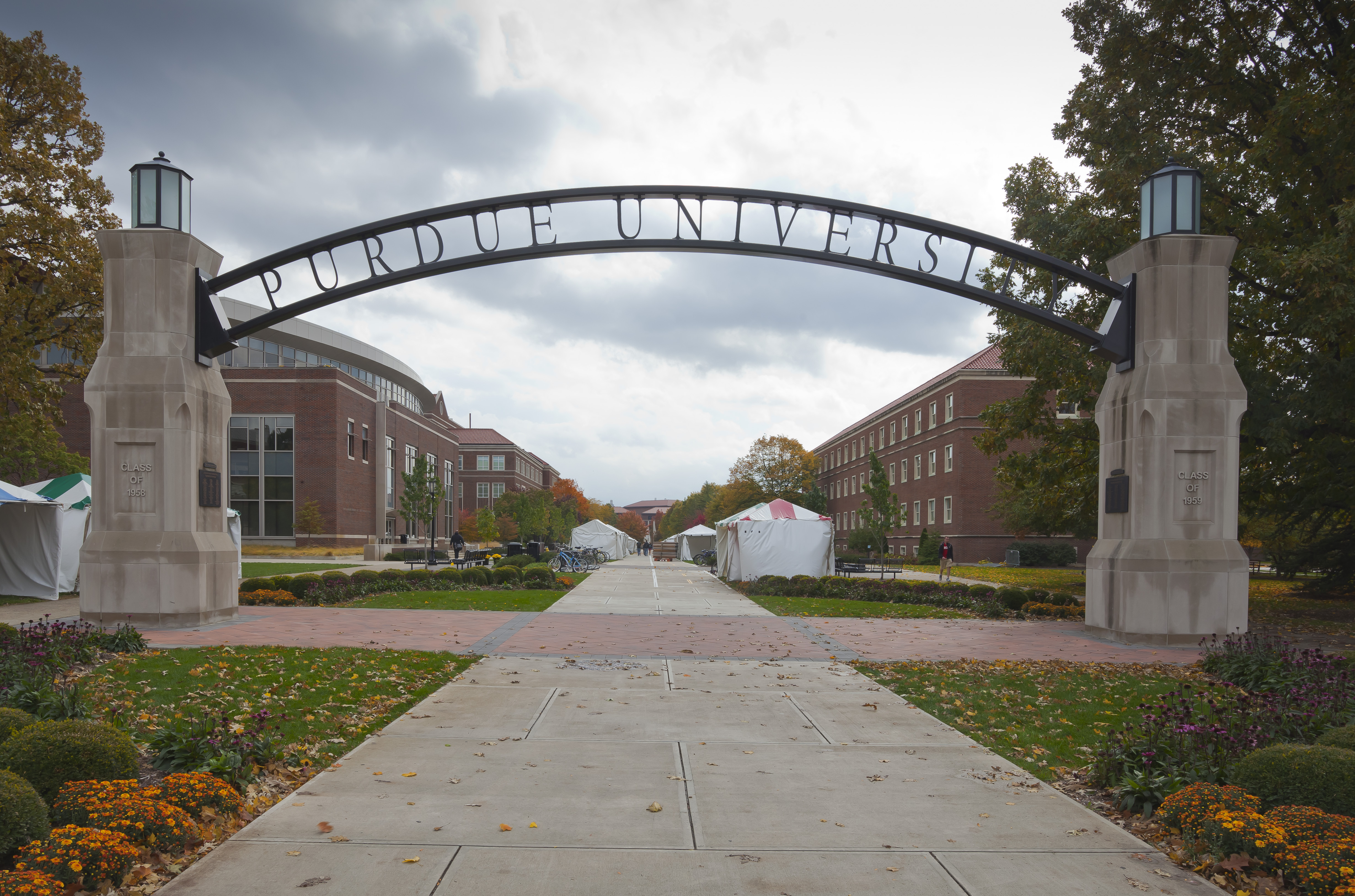
Gateway to the Future arch

== Academics ==
=== Undergraduate admissions ===
Undergraduate admissions statistics
- 2025 entering class
- Admit rate: 43.4% (▼ −23.7)
- Yield rate: 25.4 (▲ +2.4)

Test scores middle 50%
- SAT Total: 1220–1480 (among 75% of FTFs)
- ACT Composite: 28–34 (among 35% of FTFs)

Purdue University is ranked 43rd in the annual ranking of 2024 U.S. News & World Report. The 2022 annual ranking of U.S. News & World Report categorizes Purdue University-West Lafayette as "more selective". For the Class of 2025 (enrolled fall 2021), Purdue received 59,173 applications and accepted 40,759 (68.9%). Of those accepted, 10,157 enrolled, a yield rate (the percentage of accepted students who choose to attend the university) of 24.9%. Purdue's freshman retention rate is 92%, with 81.5% going on to graduate within six years.

The university started test-optional admissions with the Fall 2021 incoming class in response to the COVID-19 pandemic and has extended this through Fall 2023. Of the 62% of the incoming freshman class who submitted SAT scores; the middle 50 percent Composite scores were 1190–1430. Of the 31% of enrolled freshmen in 2021 who submitted ACT scores; the middle 50 percent Composite score was between 26 and 33.

Purdue University is a college-sponsor of the National Merit Scholarship Program and sponsored 88 Merit Scholarship awards in 2020. In the 2020–2021 academic year, 127 freshman students were National Merit Scholars.

Fall first-time freshman statistics
	2024	2023	2022	2021	2020	2019	2018	2017	2016
Applicants	78,526	72,800	68,309	59,173	57,279	54,912	53,439	48,912	48,775
Admits	39,096	36,602	35,995	40,759	38,457	32,834	30,965	28,092	27,226
Admit rate	49.8	50.3	52.7	68.9	67.1	59.8	57.9	57.4	55.8
Enrolled	11,388	9,206	9,354	10,157	8,869	8,056	8,357	7,566	7,242
Yield rate	29.1	25.2	25.9	24.9	23.1	24.5	27.0	26.9	26.6
ACT composite* (out of 36)	27–34 (25%^{†})	27–34 (24%^{†})	27–34 (29%^{†})	26–33 (31%^{†})	25–33 (46%^{†})	25–32 (50%^{†})	25–32 (51%^{†})	25–31 (60%^{†})	25–31 (62%^{†})
SAT composite* (out of 1600)	1210–1470 (79%^{†})	1210–1450 (73%^{†})	1210–1450 (67%^{†})	1190–1430 (62%^{†})	1190–1430 (82%^{†})	1190–1440 (82%^{†})	1180–1410 (76%^{†})	1150–1380 (69%^{†})	—
* middle 50% range^{†} percentage of first-time freshmen who chose to submit

=== Academic divisions ===
College/school founding
College/school	Year founded
College of Agriculture	1869
College of Education	1908
College of Engineering	1876
College of Health and Human Sciences	2010
College of Liberal Arts	1953
Daniels School of Business	1962
College of Pharmacy	1884
Purdue Polytechnic Institute	1964
College of Science	1907
College of Veterinary Medicine	1959

Purdue offers both undergraduate and graduate programs in over 211 major areas of study, and is well known for its competitive engineering curricula. The university has also been integral in America's history of aviation, having established the first college credit offered in flight training; the first four-year bachelor's degree in aviation; and the first university airport: Purdue University Airport. Purdue's aviation technology and aeronautical engineering programs remain among the most competitive aviation-specific programs in the world. In the mid-20th century, Purdue's aviation program expanded to encompass advanced spaceflight technology, giving rise to Purdue's nicknames Cradle of Astronauts and Mother of Astronauts. Twenty-seven Purdue graduates have become astronauts, including Gus Grissom, one of the original Mercury Seven astronauts; Neil Armstrong, who was the first person to walk on the Moon; and Eugene Cernan, who was the last person to walk on the Moon.

The English department at Purdue launched the first Online Writing Lab (OWL), in 1994. Many colleges and universities use the Purdue OWL website as an academic writing reference source. Professors criticized the partnership, begun in 2020, between OWL and the company Chegg, which provides AI-generated "homework help" that some consider to be plagiarism.

Purdue is organized into 10 colleges and schools. In 2010, the College of Health and Human Sciences was formed, through combining existing academic units, including the School of Nursing, the School of Health Sciences, the College of Consumer and Family Sciences, and non-humanities majors psychology and hearing and speech pathology from the College of Liberal Arts.

==== College of Agriculture ====
The university's College of Agriculture supports the university's charge as a land-grant university for the study of agriculture throughout the state.

==== College of Education ====
The College of Education offers undergraduate degrees in elementary education, social studies education, science education and special education, and graduate degrees in these and many other specialty areas of education.

==== College of Engineering ====
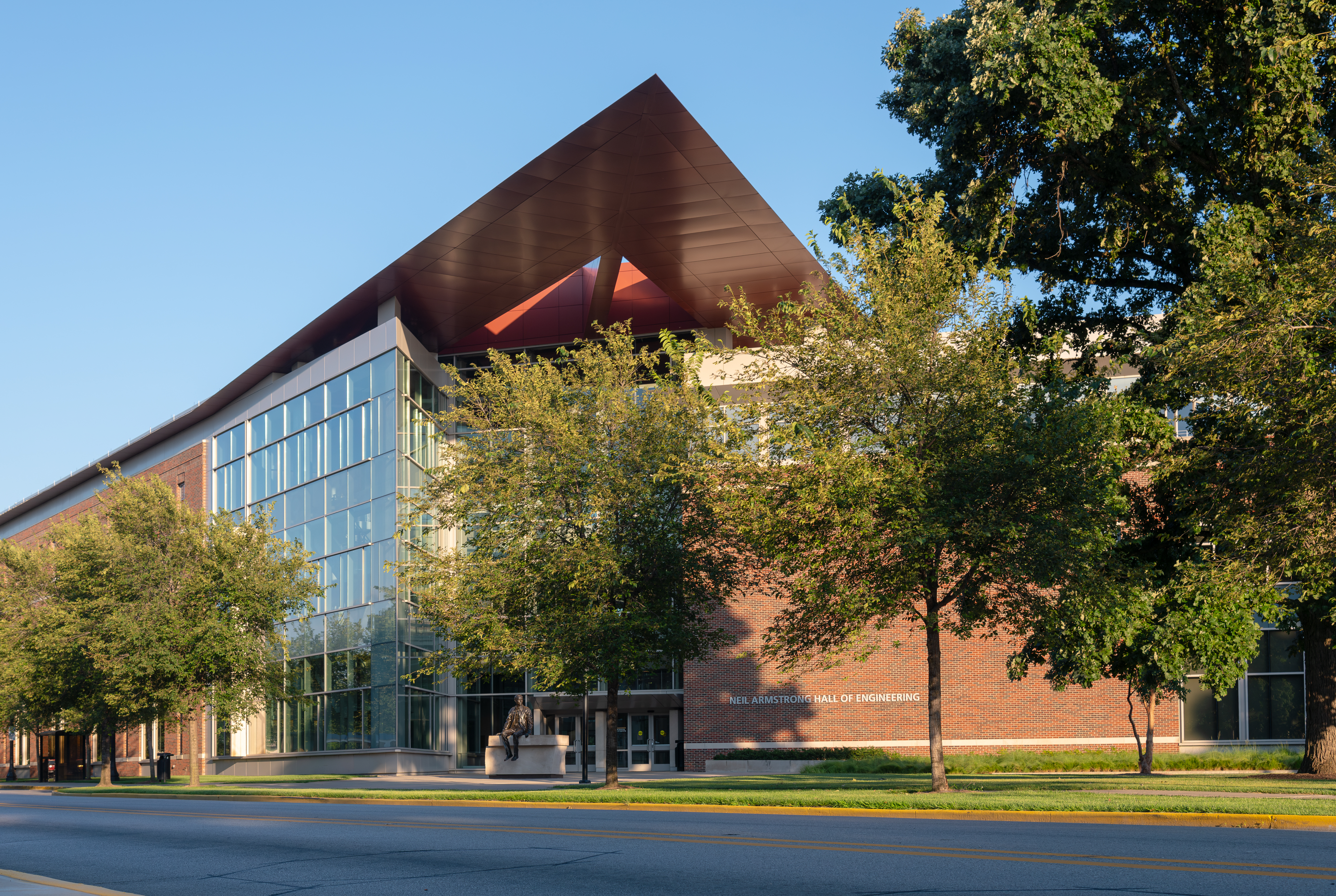
Neil Armstrong Hall of Engineering with a statue of Neil Armstrong at the entrance

The Purdue University College of Engineering was established in 1874 with programs in Civil and Mechanical Engineering. The college now offers BS, MS, and PhD degrees in more than a dozen disciplines. Purdue's engineering program has also educated 27 American astronauts, including Neil Armstrong and Eugene Cernan, who were the first and last astronauts to have walked on the Moon, respectively, and Gus Grissom, a member of the Mercury Seven. In 2025, the department announced an all-Boilermaker team to crew a commercial spaceflight mission flown by Virgin Galactic. Many of Purdue's engineering disciplines are recognized as top-ten programs in the U.S. The college as a whole is currently ranked 4th in the U.S. of all doctorate-granting engineering schools by U.S. News & World Report.

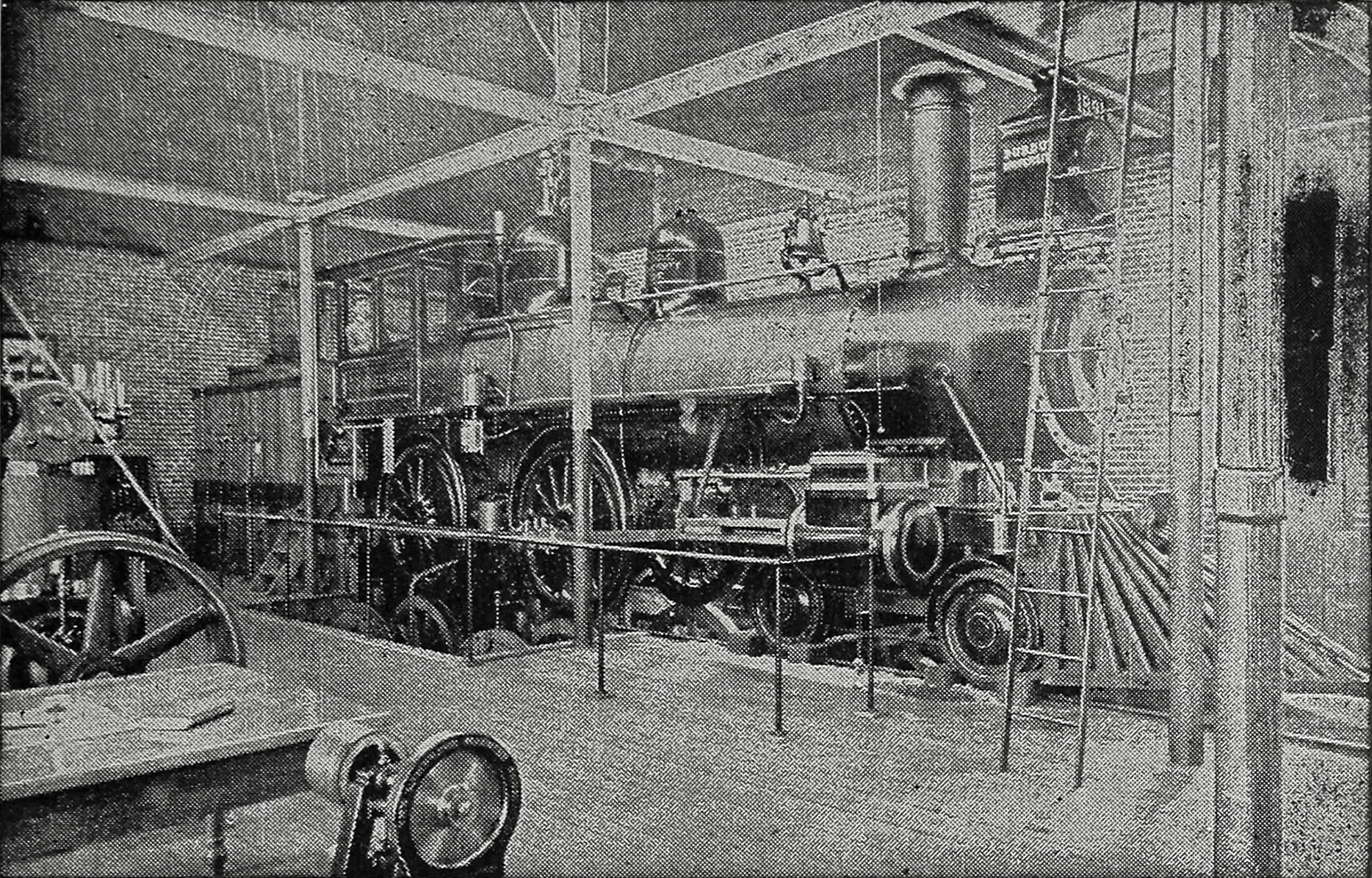
Cassier's Magazine featured the Purdue University in its August 1892 edition. Here is a look at the locomotive testing plant within the Mechanical Laboratory.

==== Exploratory Studies ====
The university's Exploratory Studies program supports undergraduate students who enter the university without having a declared major. It was founded as a pilot program in 1995 and made a permanent program in 1999.

==== College of Health and Human Sciences ====
The College of Health and Human Sciences was established in 2010 and is the newest college. It offers BS, MS and PhD degrees in all 9 of its academic units.

==== College of Liberal Arts ====
Purdue's College of Liberal Arts contains the arts, social sciences and humanities programs at the university. Liberal arts courses have been taught at Purdue since its founding in 1874. The School of Science, Education, and Humanities was formed in 1953. In 1963, the School of Humanities, Social Sciences, and Education was established, although Bachelor of Arts degrees had begun to be conferred as early as 1959. In 1989, the School of Liberal Arts was created to encompass Purdue's arts, humanities, and social sciences programs, while education programs were split off into the newly formed School of Education. The School of Liberal Arts was renamed the College of Liberal Arts in 2005.

==== Daniels School of Business ====
The Daniels School of Business offers management courses and programs at the undergraduate, master's, and doctoral levels.

==== College of Pharmacy ====
The university's College of Pharmacy was established in 1884 and is the 3rd oldest state-funded school of pharmacy in the United States.

==== Purdue Polytechnic Institute ====
The Purdue Polytechnic Institute, formerly known as the College of Technology, offers bachelor's, master's and PhD degrees in a wide range of technology-related disciplines. With over 30,000 living alumni, it is one of the largest technology schools in the United States. In addition to the main school in West Lafayette, Purdue Polytechnic operates nine satellite campuses in Anderson, Columbus, Indianapolis, Kokomo, Lafayette, New Albany, Richmond, Vincennes, and South Bend. These locations offer certificate, associate, and/or bachelor's degrees, some of which are ABET-accredited technical degrees.

The Polytechnic Institute also maintains two high school campuses in Indianapolis that focus on science, technology, engineering, and mathematics and feature hands-on project-based learning. While having also maintained a high school campus in South Bend, Polytechnic Institute announced the closure of the South Bend campus with the end of the 2025–2026 school year.

==== College of Science ====
The university's College of Science houses the university's science departments: Biological Sciences; Chemistry; Computer Science; Earth, Atmospheric, & Planetary Sciences; Mathematics; Physics & Astronomy; and Statistics. The science courses offered by the college account for about one-fourth of Purdue's one million student credit hours.

==== College of Veterinary Medicine ====
The College of Veterinary Medicine is accredited by the AVMA.

==== Honors College ====
Purdue's John Martinson Honors College supports an honors program for undergraduate students at the university. The Honors College's mission is to "create and foster well-rounded, well-educated global leaders," through their four pillars of interdisciplinary academics, undergraduate research, community and global engagement, and leadership development.

==== Purdue Online ====
Through Purdue Online, the administrative unit charged with planning and enabling the effort, Purdue has a growing online presence, in addition to Purdue Global, offering more than 200 programs through the university's four accredited institutions (Purdue West Lafayette, Purdue Northwest and Purdue Fort Wayne in Indiana and Purdue Global) including master's degree programs. Purdue Online, the unified online education initiative approved by Purdue President Mitch Daniels and the Purdue Board of Trustees in December 2018, is intended to radically expand these offerings by developing a "coordinated, unified system-wide portfolio of online course and degree offerings for students of all types." Students manage their Purdue University admin account using the BrightSpace Purdue Student Portal.

=== Research ===
The university expended $622.814 million in support of research system-wide in 2017, using funds received from the state and federal governments, industry, foundations, and individual donors. The faculty and more than 400 research laboratories put Purdue University among the leading research institutions. Purdue University is considered by the Carnegie Classification of Institutions of Higher Education to have "very high research activity". Purdue also was rated the nation's fourth best place to work in academia, according to rankings released in November 2007 by The Scientist magazine. Purdue's researchers provide insight, knowledge, assistance, and solutions in many crucial areas. These include, but are not limited to Agriculture; Business and Economy; Education; Engineering; Environment; Healthcare; Individuals, Society, Culture; Manufacturing; Science; Technology; Veterinary Medicine. The Global Trade Analysis Project (GTAP), a global research consortium focused on global economic governance challenges (trade, climate, resource use) is also coordinated by the university. Purdue University generated a record $438 million in sponsored research funding during the 2009–10 fiscal year with participation from National Science Foundation, National Aeronautics and Space Administration, and the U.S. departments of Agriculture, Defense, Energy, and Health and Human Services. Purdue University was ranked fourth in Engineering research expenditures amongst all the colleges in the United States in 2017, with a research expenditure budget of 244.8 million.

Purdue University established the Discovery Park to bring innovation through multidisciplinary action. In all of the eleven centers of Discovery Park, ranging from entrepreneurship to energy and advanced manufacturing, research projects reflect a large economic impact and address global challenges. Purdue University's nanotechnology research program, built around the new Birck Nanotechnology Center in Discovery Park, ranks among the best in the nation.

The Purdue Research Park which opened in 1961 was developed by Purdue Research Foundation which is a private, nonprofit foundation created to assist Purdue. The park is focused on companies operating in the arenas of life sciences, homeland security, engineering, advanced manufacturing and information technology. It provides an interactive environment for experienced Purdue researchers and for private business and high-tech industry. It currently employs more than 3,000 people in 155 companies, including 90 technology-based firms. The Purdue Research Park was ranked first by the Association of University Research Parks in 2004.

Purdue's library system consists of fifteen locations throughout the campus, including archives and a special collections research center, an undergraduate library, and several subject-specific libraries. More than three million volumes, including one million electronic books, are held at these locations. The library houses the Amelia Earhart Collection, a collection of notes and letters belonging to Earhart and her husband George Putnam along with records related to her disappearance and subsequent search efforts. An administrative unit of Purdue University Libraries, Purdue University Press publishes books in the areas of agriculture, health, and engineering.

==== Semiconductor research ====
Semiconductor research and manufacturing facilities at Purdue University

Purdue conducts research and education in semiconductors and microelectronics, centered in part at the Birck Nanotechnology Center. In 2022, the university launched its Semiconductor Degrees Program, with coursework spanning chip design, manufacturing, materials, equipment, and advanced packaging. In 2023, IMEC and Purdue opened a joint research laboratory for semiconductor materials, systems, and sustainable manufacturing.

In 2026, SK Hynix began construction of a $4 billion advanced packaging and research facility at the Purdue Research Park in West Lafayette. The facility is intended to package high-bandwidth memory for artificial intelligence systems and include an AI semiconductor research center, with mass production planned for 2029.

=== Sustainability ===
Purdue's Sustainability Council, composed of university administrators and professors, meets monthly to discuss environmental issues and sustainability initiatives at Purdue. The university's first LEED Certified building was an addition to the Mechanical Engineering Building, which was completed in Fall 2011. The school is also in the process of developing an arboretum on campus. In addition, a system has been set up to display live data detailing current energy production at the campus utility plant. The school holds an annual "Green Week" each fall, an effort to engage the Purdue community with issues relating to environmental sustainability.

== Rankings ==
Academic rankings

National
- Forbes: 51
- U.S. News & World Report: 46 (tie)
- Washington Monthly: 26
- WSJ/College Pulse: 48

Global
- ARWU: 100
- QS: 88 (tie)
- THE: 79
- U.S. News & World Report: 173 (tie)

USNWR graduate program rankings
Audiology	8
Biological Sciences	50
Chemistry	27
Analytic Chemistry	1
Computer Science	19
Earth Sciences	42
Economics	49
Education	48
Overall Engineering	6
Electrical Engineering	7
Aerospace Engineering	2
Biological/Agricultural Engineering	1
Civil Engineering	5
Computer Engineering	8
Mechanical Engineering	8
Nuclear Engineering	10
Environmental Engineering	9
Industrial Engineering	6
English	46
Mathematics	37
Applied Mathematics	24
Mathematical Analysis	20
Pharmacy	9
Physics	38
Political Science	63
Psychology	46
Industrial and Organizational Psychology	7
Public Health	68
Sociology	54
Speech-Language Pathology	2
Statistics	22
Veterinary Medicine	11

In its 2026 edition, U.S. News & World Report ranked Purdue University the seventh most innovative national university, 8th best engineering school, 6th best school for internships and co-ops, 11th best for innovation, and 19th best public university in the United States. For its graduate programs, Purdue is ranked 5th for overall engineering, 1st for biological/agricultural engineering, 5th for aerospace engineering, 9th for computer engineering, 9th for electrical engineering, 7th for mechanical engineering, 1st for analytic chemistry, 19th for computer science, 24th for applied mathematics, and 22nd for statistics.

In its 2026 edition, the Times Higher Education ranked Purdue University 10th among all global universities for Interdisciplinary Science (7th among universities in the United States). It also ranked Purdue 30th among all global universities for engineering (16th among universities in the United States).

As of April 2025, CSRankings.org ranked Purdue's computer science program 13th overall in the United States.

== Campus life ==
Student body composition as of May 2, 2022
Race and ethnicity	Total
White	64%
Foreign national	12%
Asian	10%
Hispanic	6%
Other (Note: Other consists of multiracial Americans and those who prefer to not say.)	5%
Black	3%
Economic diversity
Low-income (Note: The percentage of students who received an income-based federal Pell grant intended for low-income students.)	15%
Affluent (Note: The percentage of students who are a part of the American middle class at the bare minimum.)	85%

=== Student body ===
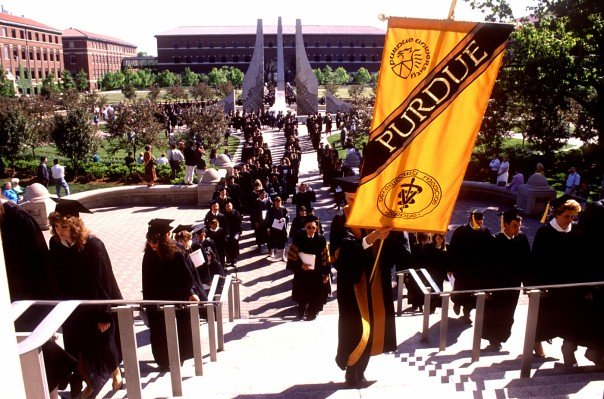
Graduation ceremony in 2008

In 2012, 8,562 students from 126 countries around the world attended Purdue University. For international student enrollment, Purdue ranks ninth among 4,500-plus public and private institutions and ranks fourth among all U.S. public universities, based on the 2024 Open Doors Report.

In 2012–13, 19,689 out of a total of 39,256 students enrolled were Indiana residents. As of 2013, the racial diversity of the US-resident undergraduate student body was 5.7% Asian, 4.4% Hispanic or Latino, and 4.0% black or African American. Of the undergraduate students, 42.6% were female. Domestic minorities constitute a total of 10.8% in the graduate student body population of which 37.3% are female. Twenty-two percent of the student body is international, representing 126 countries. In graduate and professional student population, non-Indiana residents occupy an overwhelming majority, about 75%. Almost all undergraduates and about 70% of the graduate student population attend full-time. The school's selectivity for admissions is "more selective" by USNWR: approximately 49% of applicants are admitted.

=== Housing ===
About one-third of the single undergraduate students on the West Lafayette campus live in university-owned buildings. The rest live in fraternities, sororities, cooperatives, or private off-campus housing. School sources claim over 10,000 spaces available in seventeen separate residence halls for students on campus.

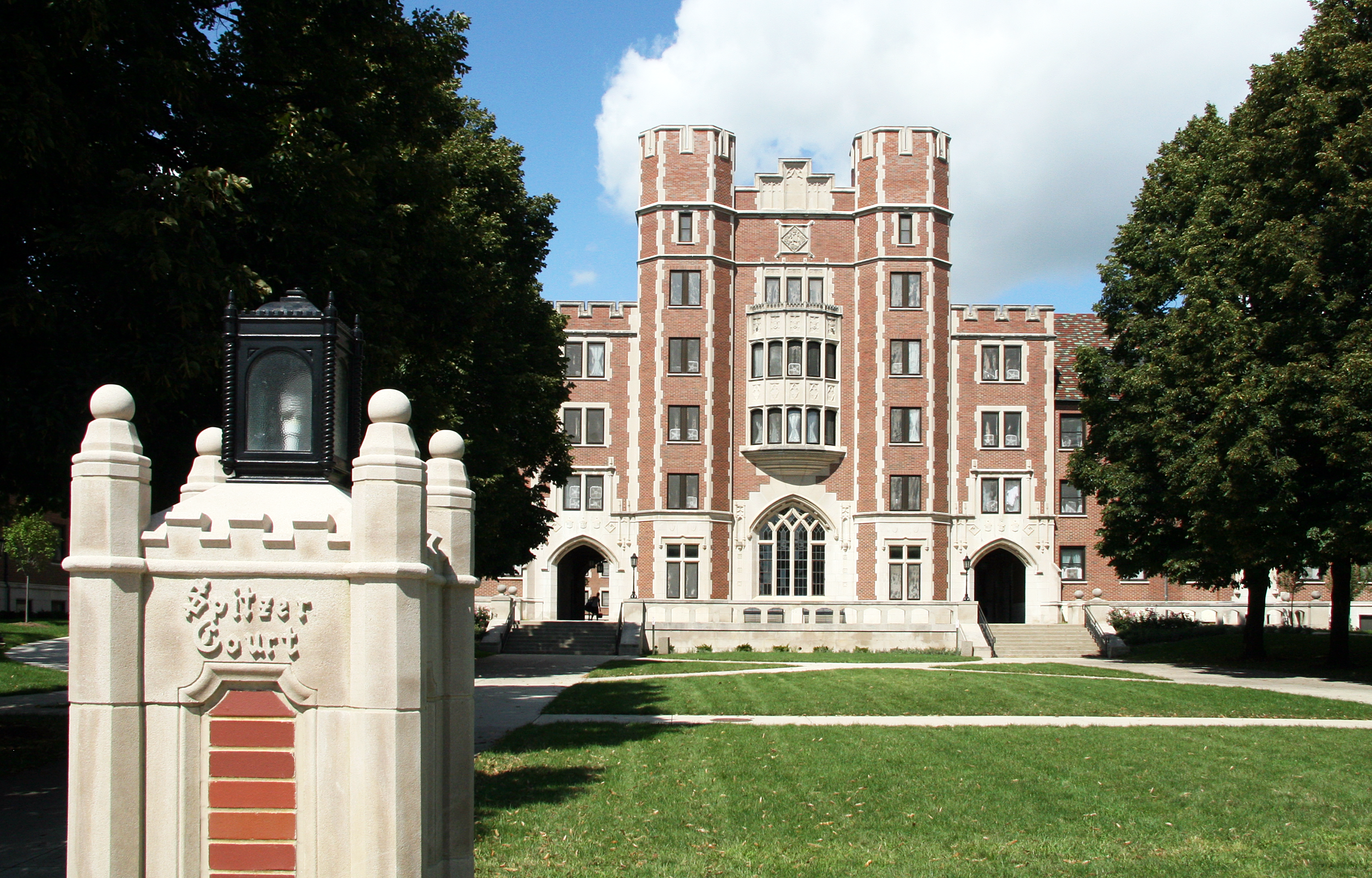
Cary Quad and Spitzer Court

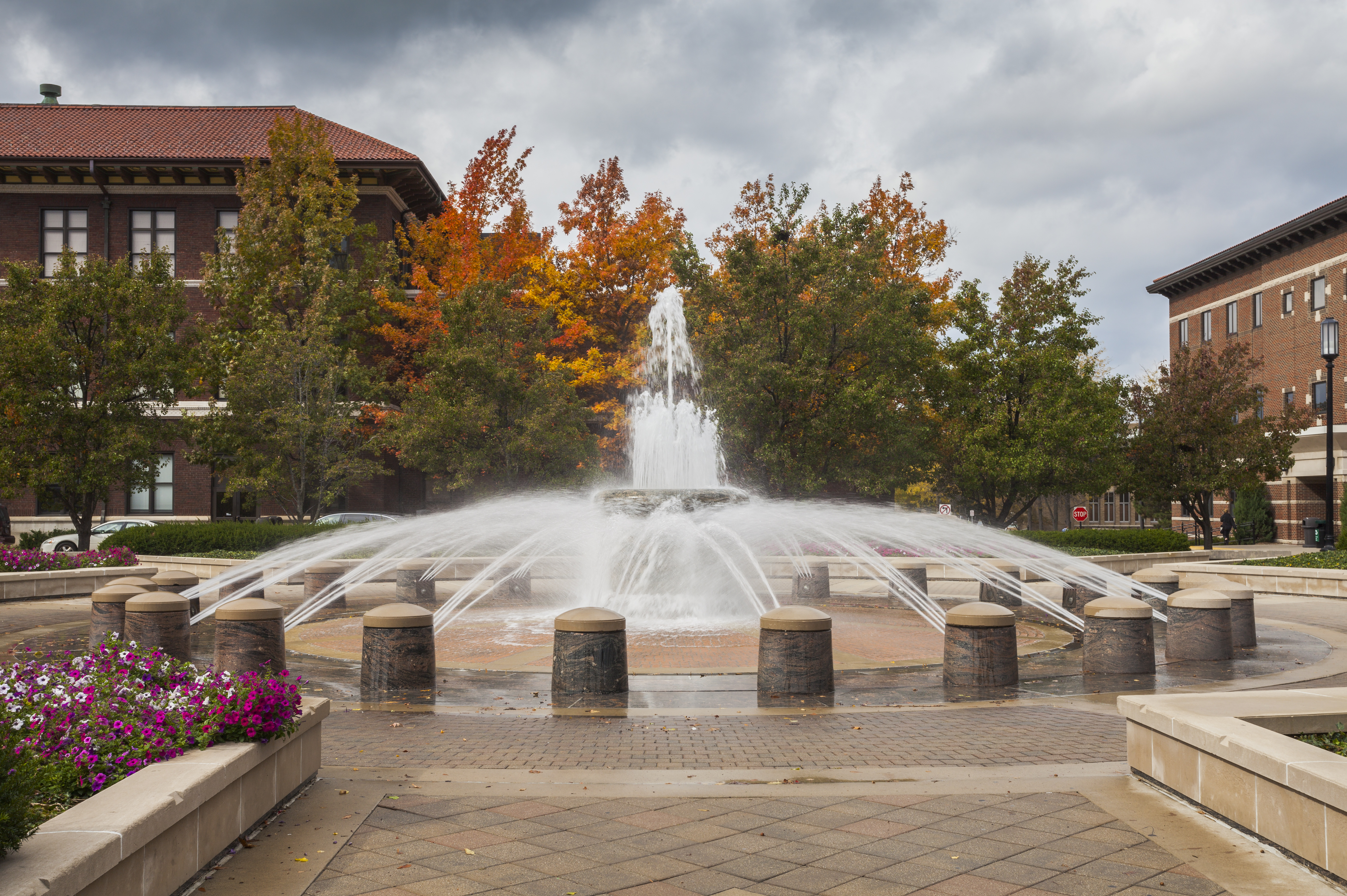
Loeb Fountain

Purdue University hosts one of the nation's largest Greek communities, with roughly 40 fraternities and 30 sororities.

=== Activities and events ===
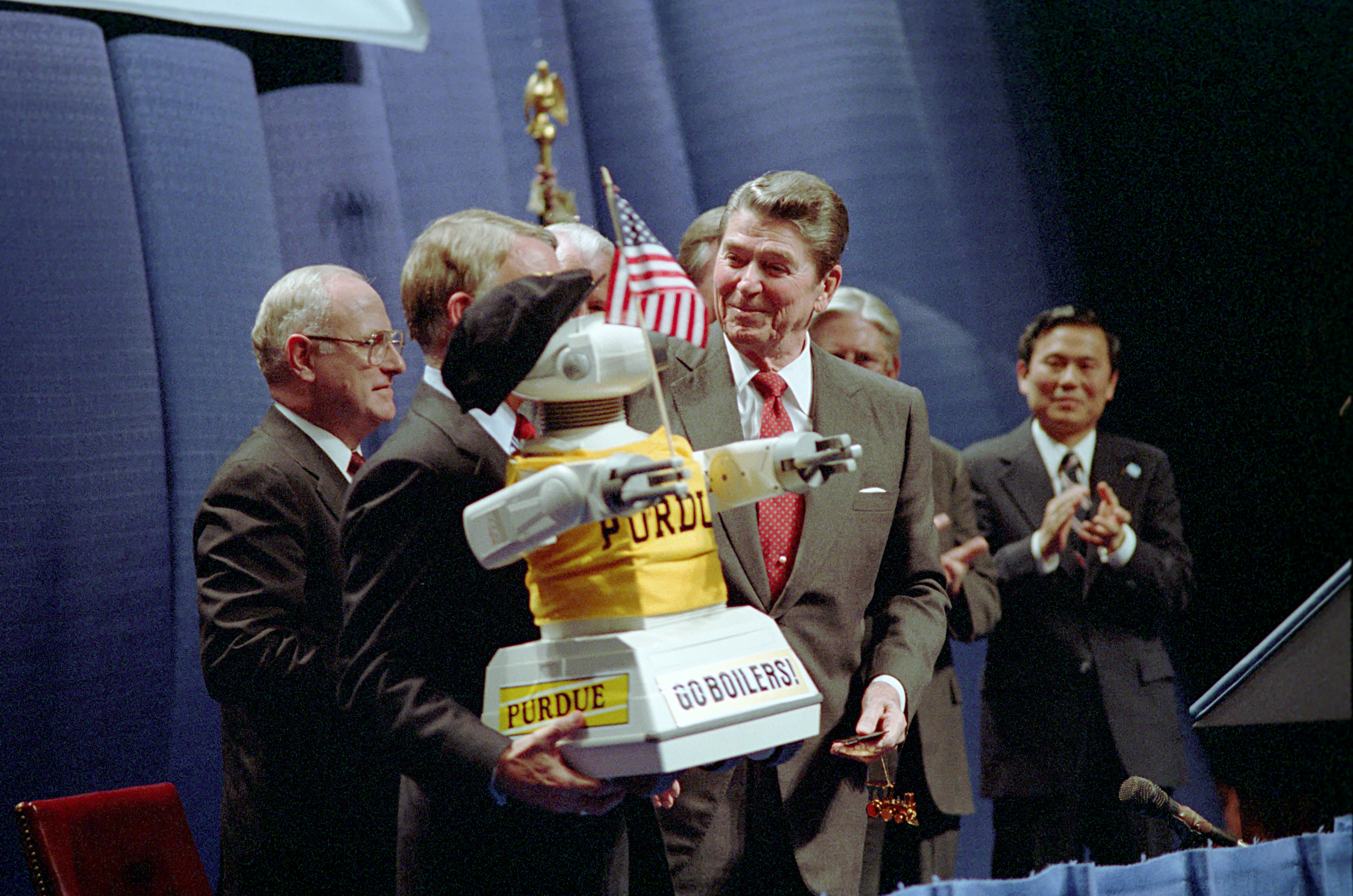
President Ronald Reagan visiting Purdue in 1987

Students at Purdue participate in more than 1,000 student organizations that cover a variety of interests. Some of the notable clubs founded by Purdue students include the Purdue Reamer Club (a school spirit organization that cares for the Boilermaker Special mascot and raises funds for scholarships) and two clubs that eventually became nationwide organizations: the National Society of Black Engineers and the Rube Goldberg Machine Contest.

Several campus-wide programs are planned by the Purdue Alumni Student Experience (part of the Alumni Association), Purdue Student Union Board, Purdue Student Government (PSG), or the Purdue Graduate Student Government (PGSG). PSG and PGSG are made up of representatives from each of the university's academic colleges and give recommendations to the faculty, administration, and sometimes to the state legislature.

Annual campus events include Boiler Gold Rush, Purdue University Dance Marathon, Spring Fest, and Grand Prix. Boiler Gold Rush (BGR) is Purdue's annual student orientation program and a sports pep rally. Purdue University Dance Marathon (PUDM) is an 18-hour no-sitting, no-sleeping, dance marathon; over 2,000 students participate and the event raises over $1 million annually for Riley Hospital for Children in Indianapolis. Spring Fest is an annual carnival with entertaining exhibits from many academic departments. A highlight of the weekend is the Entomology Department's Bug Bowl, where the sport of cricket spitting was invented in 1997. The Purdue Grand Prix, a 50-mile, 160-lap go-kart race ends Gala Week each year. All 33 participating karts are made from scratch by student teams. The event has been raising money for student scholarships since it began in 1958.

=== Religious life ===
Purdue has a number of religious organizations on and near the campus. St. Thomas Aquinas Catholic Church serves the Catholic community at Purdue and the surrounding community. The Chapel of the Good Shepherd hosts the Episcopal Student Association and is a part of the Episcopal Diocese of Indianapolis. The Purdue Hillel Foundation and Chabad at Purdue are the university's Jewish campus organizations. The Islamic Society of Greater Lafayette has an Islamic center serving the needs of the Muslim community on campus.

== Media ==
The Purdue Exponent, an independent student newspaper, has the largest circulation of any Indiana college newspaper, with a daily circulation of 17,500 copies during the spring and fall semesters. From 1889 to 2008 Purdue published a yearbook called the Debris.

WBAA are radio station operations owned by and licensed to Metropolitan Indianapolis Public Media, with studios at the university, featuring three noncommercial stations: WBAA News, WBAA Classical, and WBAA Jazz. The stations can be heard on AM 920, 101.3 FM, and 105.9 FM. WBAA also broadcasts on HD Radio and digital platforms including wbaa.org and the WBAA app. Its studios are in the Edward C. Elliott Hall of Music on the Purdue campus, and the transmitters are in Lafayette, Indiana. WBAA is the longest continuously operating radio station in Indiana, having been licensed on April 4, 1922. WBAA is a NPR member station. Despite some public disapproval, in 2022, Purdue sold WBAA (AM) and WBAA-FM to WFYI-FM. Purdue received $700,000 in underwriting credit while agreeing to provide an investment of $250,000 annually for two years to WFYI to offset initial operating costs.

Historically, there were three main campus radio stations at Purdue University which operated from residence halls: WCCR from Cary Quadrangle, WILY from Wiley Residence Hall, and WHHR from Harrison Residence Hall. No student radio stations currently broadcast on AM or FM frequencies and instead broadcast exclusively online. WHHR officially shut down operations in the mid-1990s following a lapse in funding, lack of student interest, and the shutdown of the Purdue Radio Network, and remained shuttered until the late-2000s, at which time most of the broadcast equipment, vinyl records, and items in the recording studio were sold off to raise funds for a revival. The second iteration of WHHR operated from around 2008 until sometime in either 2011 or 2012, when it again ceased operations. As of 2026, there have been one or two short-lived attempts to revive the station, but the studio remains empty and unused. In the early 1990s, WILY also had a lapse in funding and closed operations until sometime in the 2000s, when student interest generated funds and resurrected the station. Students are able to reserve time on WILY (now colloquially known among students as Wiley Radio) and broadcast on their service through analog equipment (such as vinyl records or actual instruments) or digital music streaming. Podcasts are also commonplace and the facilities encourage them. WCCR and WILY both operate digitally 24/7 and are fully staffed by students, with each station's respective website detailing program schedules.

W9YB is the callsign of the Amateur Radio Club at Purdue University. W9YB is the longest standing club on campus and also holds the self-declared title of having one of the largest and most active collegiate amateur radio stations in the country. W9YB actively participates in emergency management for the Tippecanoe County area and maintains ready status with its members in skills to assist. W9YB is among the longest standing amateur radio clubs in the United States, with the current callsign dating back to 1932 and the previous callsign 9YB dating back to 1920.

The Movie Tribute Show was created in a small television studio (now known as the Erik Mygrant Studio) on campus in 1999.

== Athletics ==
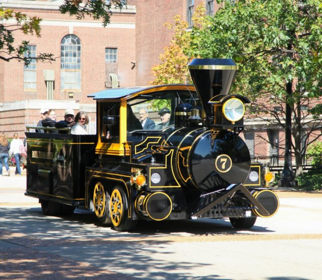
Purdue's mascots, the Boilermaker Special and Purdue Pete

On October 26, 1891, a newspaper in Crawfordsville, Indiana called Purdue's football team the "Boiler Makers" when writing about their trouncing of Wabash College. Lafayette newspapers soon picked up the name, and in October 1892, The Purdue Exponent, Purdue's student newspaper, gave it the stamp of approval. In the early days of Purdue football, the team was called other names as well, including "haymakers", "railsplitters", "sluggers", and "cornfield sailors". This heritage is reflected in Purdue's official mascot: the Boilermaker Special (a truck-like vehicle that resembles a locomotive) and the athletic mascot Purdue Pete (a muscular hammer-wielding boilermaker). The school colors of old gold and black were selected by Purdue's first football team in 1887 to resemble the orange and black of Princeton's then-successful team. This made Purdue football the first sports team to ever use a black and gold color palette. The best known fight song is "Hail Purdue!".

Purdue has one of the few college athletic programs not funded by student fees or subsidized by the university. It is home to 18 Division I/I-A NCAA teams including football, basketball, cross country, tennis, wrestling, golf, volleyball, ice hockey (ACHA), and others. Purdue is a founding member of the Big Ten Conference, and played a central role in its creation. Traditional rivals include Big Ten colleagues the Indiana Hoosiers (see Indiana–Purdue rivalry), the Illinois Fighting Illini, and the Notre Dame Fighting Irish from the Atlantic Coast Conference (football program independent, however).

Purdue's baseball facility was named in honor of two alumni, Anna Margaret Ross Alexander and her husband, John Arthur Alexander, when the new stadium was dedicated in 2013.

=== Football ===
The Boilermaker football team represents Purdue University in the NCAA Football Bowl Subdivision (FBS). Purdue plays its home games at Ross-Ade Stadium on the university's campus. The Boilermakers compete in the Big Ten Conference as a member of the West Division.

Found on a farm in southern Indiana, the Old Oaken Bucket is one of the oldest American football trophies. The winner of Purdue's annual game against the Indiana University Hoosiers gets to keep the trophy until the next face-off and add a bronze "P" or "I" link to its chain. The first competition in 1925 led to a 0–0 tie, resulting in the first link on the chain being an "IP." As of 13 January 2024, Purdue led the series 77–42–6.

During "Breakfast Club", best described as a cross between a pep rally and a Halloween party, students and even some alumni dress up in costumes, from traditional Halloween garb to creative hand-made costumes, as they bar-hop before Boilermaker home football games. The Breakfast Club plays a significant role during the football season and is informally a part of Purdue tradition. Many Boilermaker fans are dedicated; getting up at 5:00 a.m. on Saturdays and lining up at the bars on Chauncey Hill and the levee by 6:00 a.m. on game days. The Breakfast Club tradition began in the 1980s during the annual Purdue Grand Prix race in April. Another tradition is Saturday morning wake-ups, where the Boilermaker Special uses its many loud horns and whistles to wake dorm students up in preparation for the day's game.

=== Basketball ===
The Purdue Boilermakers men's basketball team competes in NCAA Division I and is a member of the Big Ten Conference. Purdue won its 25th Big Ten Conference Championship and 2nd Big Ten Tournament Championship in 2023. This leads the conference, as Indiana University Bloomington is second with 22 conference championships. The Boilermakers were retroactively designated the 1932 national champions by the Helms Athletic Foundation and the Premo-Porretta Power Poll, but have not won an NCAA Championship: they were the 1969 runner-up, falling to legendary coach and former Purdue player John Wooden-led UCLA in the national championship game, the 1980 third-place finisher, falling to UCLA in the semifinals of the Final Four but defeating Iowa in the consolation game, and the 2024 runner-up, falling to Connecticut in the national championship game. The Purdue men's team has sent more than 30 players to the NBA including two overall No. 1 picks in the NBA draft. The Purdue women's basketball team were the 1999 NCAA Champions and 2001 runners-up. The Boilermakers men's and women's basketball teams have won more Big Ten Championships than any other conference school, with 32 regular-season conference titles and 11 Big Ten Tournament titles. Purdue men's basketball achieved an all-time winning record against all Big Ten schools when it gained a winning record over Ohio State with three wins in 2023, improving that record from 91–92 to 94–92.

== People ==
=== Faculty ===
The original faculty of six in 1874 has grown to 2,563 tenured and tenure-track faculty in the Purdue Statewide System by Fall 2007 totals. The number of faculty and staff members system-wide is 18,872. The current faculty includes scholars such as Arden L. Bement Jr. (director of the National Science Foundation), R. Graham Cooks, Douglas Comer, Louis de Branges de Bourcia (who proved the Bieberbach conjecture), Victor Raskin, David Sanders, Leah Jamieson, James L. Mohler (who has written several manuals of computer graphics), and Samuel S. Wagstaff Jr. (inventor of the Wagstaff prime).

Purdue's tenured faculty comprises 60 academic deans, associate deans, and assistant deans; 63 academic department heads; 753 professors; 547 associate professors; and 447 assistant professors. Purdue employs 892 non-tenure-track faculty, lecturers, and postdoctoral researchers at its West Lafayette campus. Purdue employs another 691 tenured and 1,021 non-tenure track faculty, lecturers, and postdoctoral researchers at its regional campuses and Statewide Technology unit.

Two faculty members (chemists Herbert C. Brown and Ei-ichi Negishi) have been awarded Nobel Prizes while at Purdue. In all, 13 Nobel Prizes in five fields have been associated with Purdue, including students, researchers, and current and previous faculty. Other notable faculty of the past have included Golden Gate Bridge designer Charles Alton Ellis, efficiency expert Lillian Gilbreth, food safety advocate Harvey Wiley, aviator Amelia Earhart, president of the National Association of Mathematicians Edray Goins, radio pioneer Reginald Fessenden, and Yeram S. Touloukian, founder of the Thermophysical Properties Research Center.

=== Alumni ===
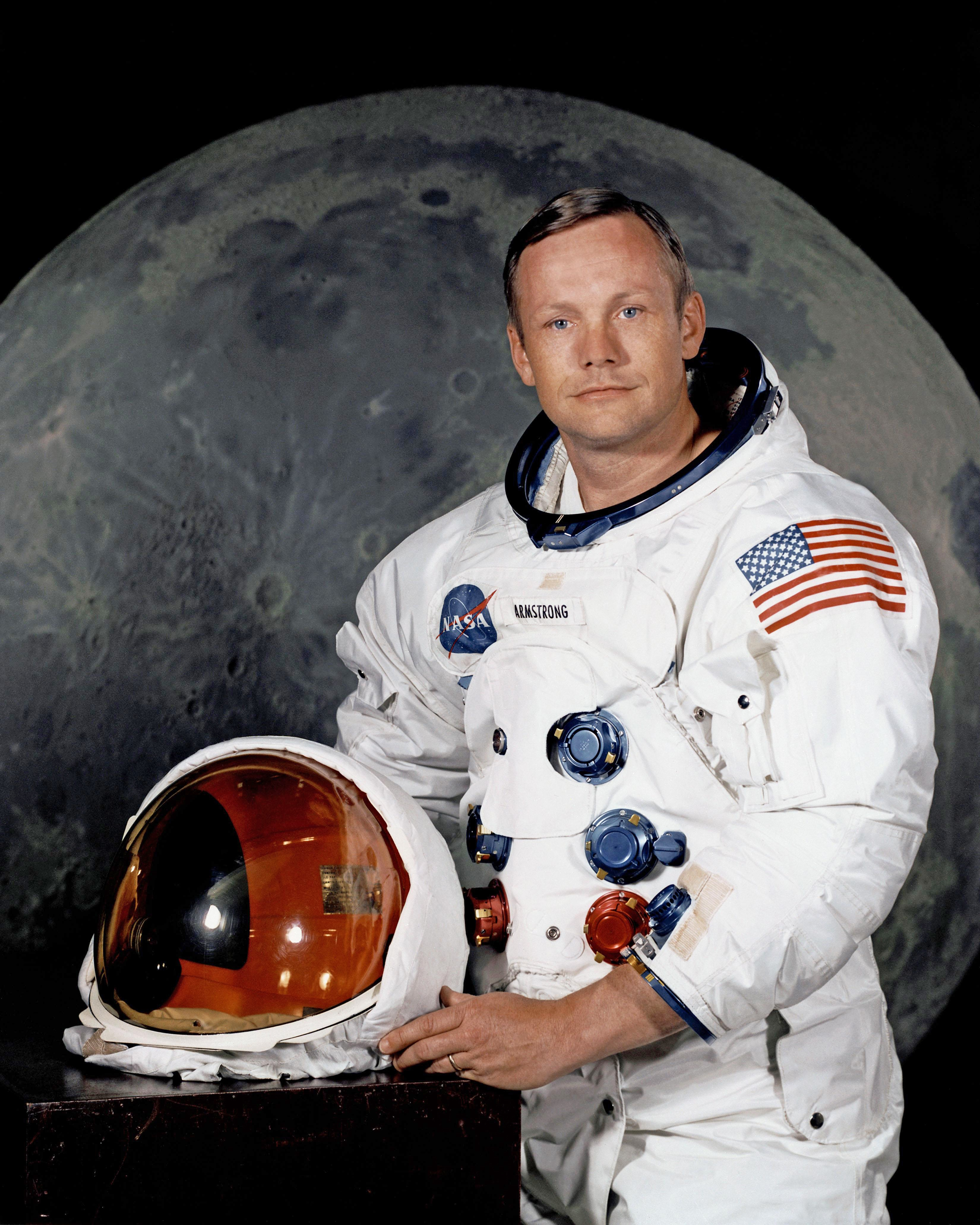
Neil Armstrong

Purdue alumni have achieved recognition in a range of areas, particularly in the science, engineering, and aviation industries. The university's alumni pool collectively holds over 15,000 United States patents.

Purdue alumni include 27 astronauts, including Gus Grissom, America's second man in space and first to fly in NASA's Gemini program, Neil Armstrong, the first to walk on the Moon, and Eugene Cernan, the last astronaut to do so. Over one-third of all of NASA's crewed space missions have had at least one Purdue graduate as a crew member.

In science, Purdue has also produced Nobel Prize–winning physicists in Edward Mills Purcell (BS) and Ben Roy Mottelson (BS), as well as Nobel Prize–winning chemist Akira Suzuki (post-doc). Other noted Purdue alumni in science include pioneer of robotics and remote control technology Thomas B. Sheridan; Debian founder Ian Murdock; Chinese physicist Deng Jiaxian, a founding father and key contributor to the Chinese nuclear weapon programs; mathematician Yitang Zhang; chemist Lawrence Rocks; biochemist Edwin T. Mertz, credited with the discovery of high-protein corn and beans; Indian chemist CNR Rao, who has been awarded the Bharat Ratna, the highest civilian award in India; engineer Mohamed Atalla who invented the MOS transistor; physical organic chemist and advocate for women and minorities in science Nina Roscher, who received the ACS Award for Encouraging Women into Careers in the Chemical Sciences (1996) and the Presidential Award for Excellence in Science, Mathematics and Engineering Mentoring (1998); and professor Reuben J. Olembo, a geneticist and environmentalist who went on to become the deputy executive director of UNEP and a UN Assistant Secretary-General, and who was recognized by Purdue in 1994 with a Distinguished Alumni Award for Agriculture.

In business and economics, Purdue alumni include Stephen Bechtel, Jr., owner of Bechtel Corporation; Federal Reserve Bank president Jeffrey Lacker; and popcorn specialist Orville Redenbacher. In 2010, Bloomberg also revealed Purdue was one of the universities in America with the most undergraduate alumni as chief executive officers of S&P 500 firms. These include Gregory Wasson, president/CEO of Walgreens; Mark Miller, chairman/president/CEO of Stericycle; Charles Davidson, former chairman/CEO of Noble Energy; Samuel Allen, chairman/president/CEO of Deere & Company; Don Thompson, president/COO of McDonald's; and John Martin, chairman/CEO of Gilead Sciences, Inc.; and Patti Poppe, CEO of PG&E.

In government and culture, Purdue alumni include Pulitzer Prize–winners Booth Tarkington and John T. McCutcheon, as well as Ginger Thompson, former New York Times reporter currently with ProPublica; Akinwumi Adesina, former Nigerian minister of Agriculture and Rural development and current president of the African Development Bank; Essam Sharaf, former Egyptian prime minister; John Bevere, televangelist and author; Tom Moore, theater and television director; James Thomson, CEO of Rand Corporation; Brian Lamb, founder and CEO of C-SPAN; Harry G. Leslie, former governor of Indiana; Kirk Fordice, former governor of Mississippi; Earl Butz, former U.S. secretary of agriculture; Birch Bayh, former U.S. senator; Herman Cain, 2012 presidential candidate; David McKinley, current West Virginia congressman; Sun Li-jen, former Kuomintang general; Rammohan Naidu Kinjarapu, Indian Parliament member; Dulquer Salmaan, Indian film actor; Blake Ragsdale Van Leer, former Georgia Tech president; Anthony W. Miller, former U.S. deputy secretary of education; and Hugo F. Sonnenschein, former University of Chicago president. Richard O. Klemm, former CEO of Food Warming Equipment and Illinois state legislator, also graduated from Purdue.

In sports, Purdue has produced basketball coach John Wooden; basketball Hall of Famers Stretch Murphy, Piggy Lambert, and Rick Mount; NBA Champions Paul Hoffman, Herm Gilliam, Frank Kendrick, Jerry Sichting, Glenn Robinson, and Brian Cardinal; and NBA All-Stars Glenn Robinson, Brad Miller, Terry Dischinger, and Joe Barry Carroll. Purdue has three NFL Super Bowl–winning quarterbacks in Drew Brees, Bob Griese, and Len Dawson. Nineteen Purdue alumni had been on a Super Bowl–winning team as of 2011. Purdue also produced Super Bowl IV winning coach Hank Stram. 2008 Daytona 500 winner Ryan Newman graduated from Purdue with a bachelor's degree in vehicle structure engineering.

Three Purdue alumni have received the Presidential Medal of Freedom, the highest civilian award of the United States: Neil Armstrong, Brian Lamb, and John Wooden.

The 67,000-square-foot (6,200 m^{2}) Dauch Alumni Center houses the Purdue for Life Foundation. The foundation was created in 2020 by uniting the Purdue Alumni Association and the University Development Office.
