= Purdue Bell Tower =

Bell tower in Purdue University, United States

Coordinates: 40.4272°N 86.9140°W

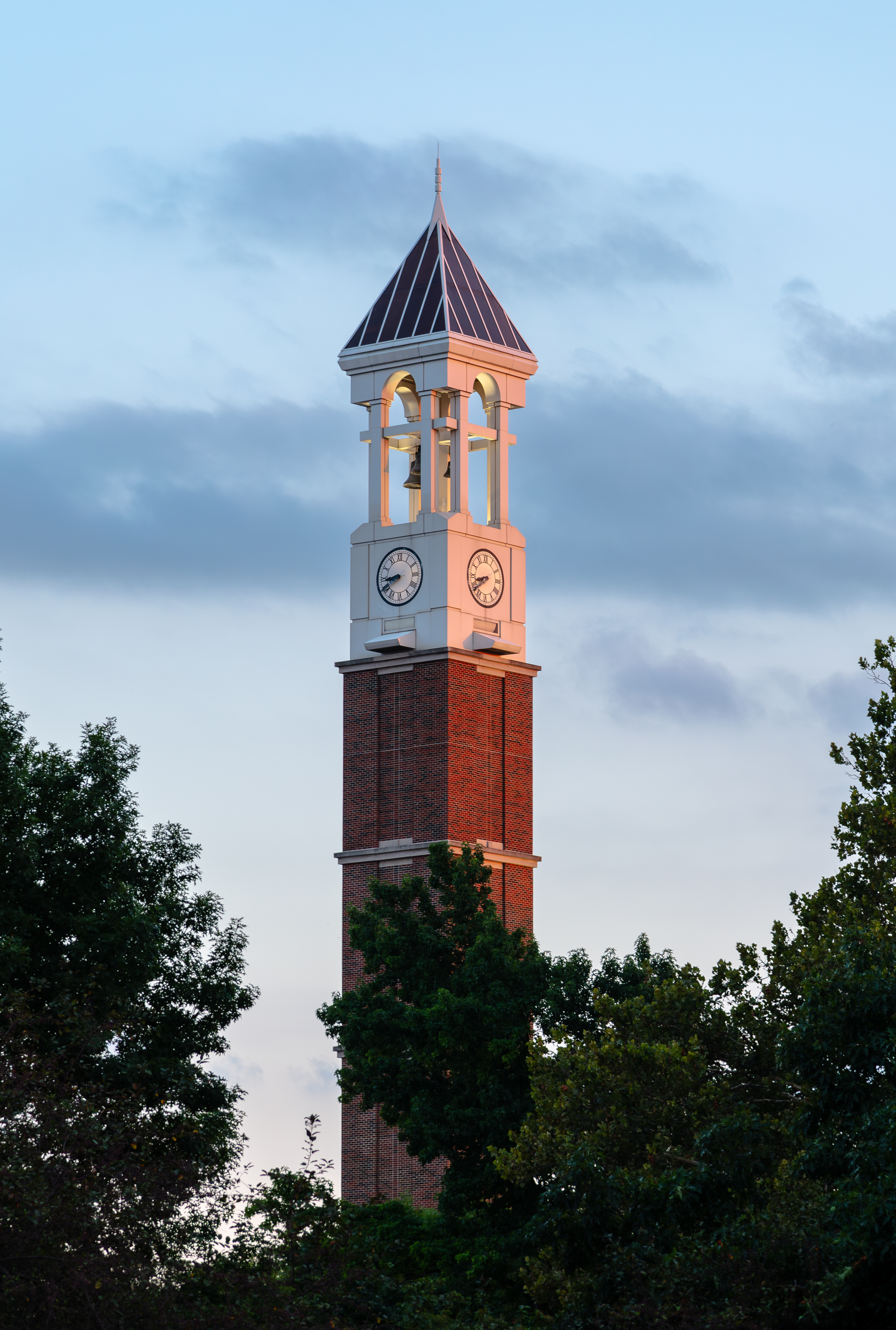
Purdue's Bell Tower

The Purdue Bell Tower is a 160-foot tall bell tower in the center of Purdue University's campus. It was constructed in 1995 through a gift from the class of 1948.

== Heavilon Hall Tower ==
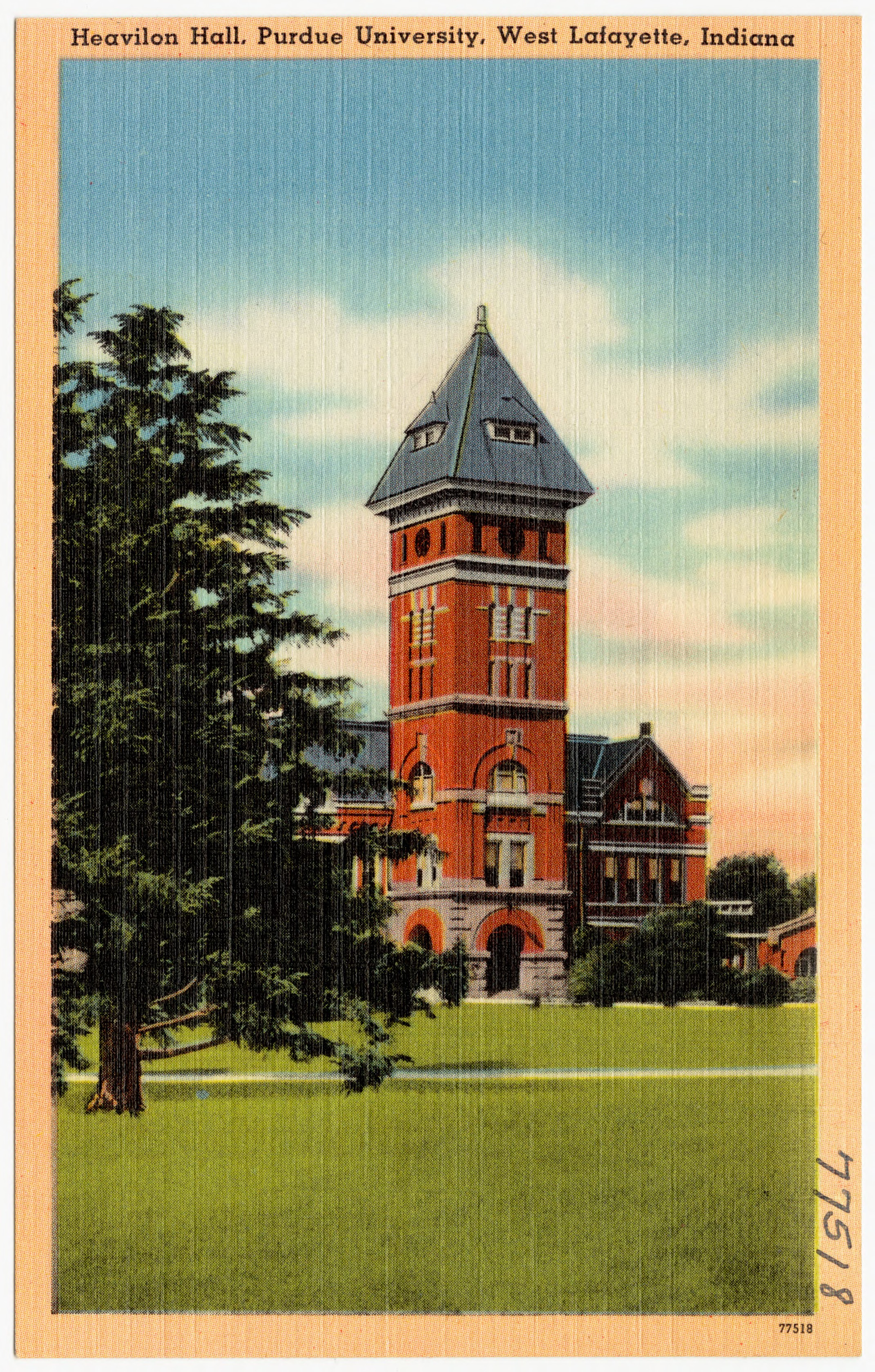
Heavilon Hall II (1895–1956)

The current Bell Tower's inspiration comes from the bell tower that was part of the old Heavilon Hall, demolished in 1956. Heavilon Hall was dedicated on January 19, 1894, as part of Purdue's engineering school. Four days later, the building caught fire and was destroyed. In light of this tragedy, James H. Smart, Purdue's president at the time, declared that a new tower would go up "one brick higher." Smart's inspirational words have since become a sort of motto for the university. According to legend, however, the bell tower was actually built nine bricks higher. This second Heavilon tower was completed in December 1895 with clocks on each of the four sides. On April 8, 1897, four bells were installed. These bells would mark every quarter-hour until Heavilon was demolished in 1956.

== Purdue Bell Tower ==
Through a gift from the class of 1948, a new bell tower was completed in 1995. The new tower stands 160 feet tall and, like the original, has a clock on each of its four faces. The bells from the original Heavilon tower hang at the top of the tower and are struck by electric clappers to ring at the hour, half-hour and end of classes. In addition, a computerized carillon plays Purdue's fight songs and the alma mater at 12:20 pm, 5:00 pm, and 10:00 pm. At the base of the tower is a time capsule that is to be opened in 2095.

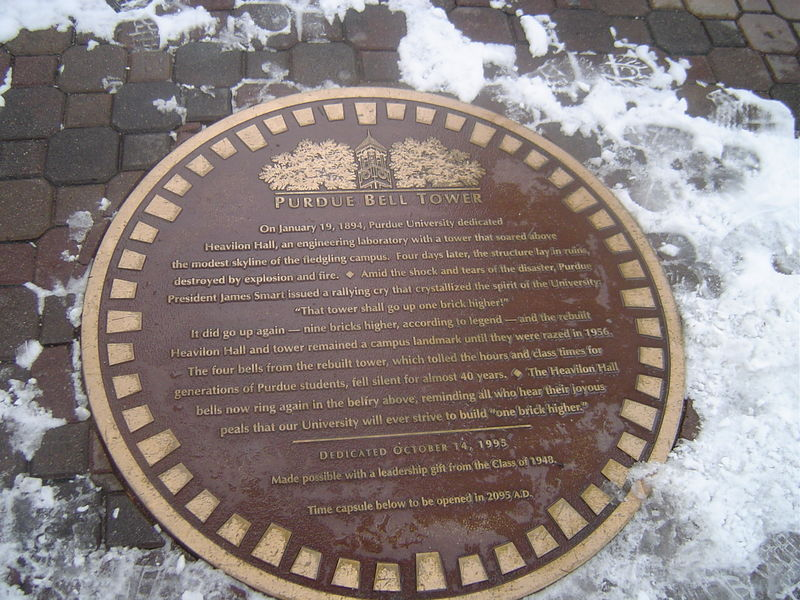
The walkway under the tower including the time capsule

In 2008, the bell tower was incorporated into the university's emergency notification system. The tower now contains a loudspeaker and sirens that can be heard outdoors throughout the academic portion of campus.

One legend about the Purdue Bell Tower states that the seal underneath it is cursed, and that any student who walks across the seal will not graduate in four years. It is also said that if a couple kisses under the tower, and then walk past the nearby Stone Lion Fountain, they will eventually be married.

On November 27, 2018, during repairs to the tower, one of the clock faces fell from a crane during routine repairs, bounced off the basket of an aerial work platform holding two workers, and hit the side of the tower on its way to the ground. No people were injured by the falling clock. The incident was captured on video.
