= Windsor Halls =

Residence hall complex on Purdue University's campus

Windsor Residence Halls
- Purdue University
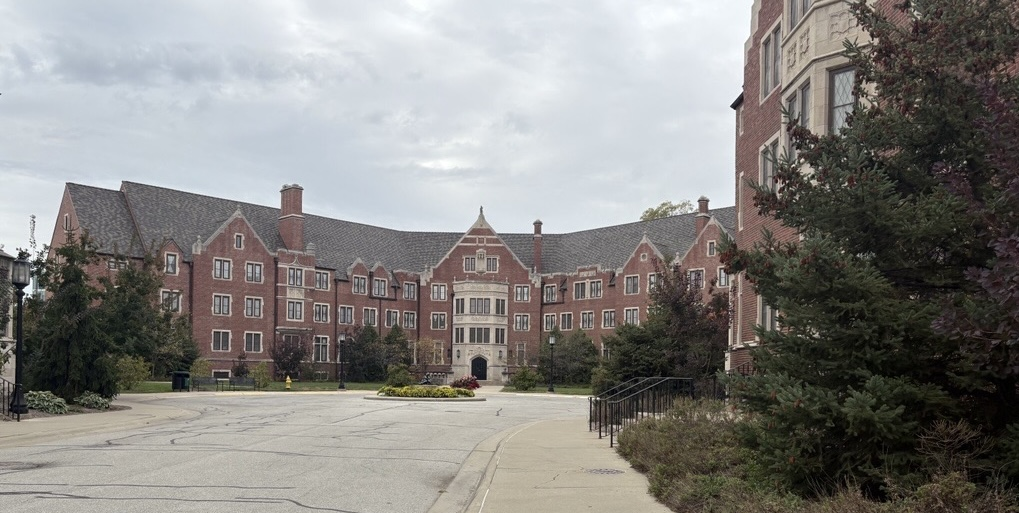
- Windsor Residence Halls from N. Russell St.
- Location: 205 North Russell Street, West Lafayette, IN 47906
- Coordinates: 40.4263°N 86.9208°W
- Established: 1934
- Architectural style: English Tudor Revival

Windsor Residence Halls is the oldest all-female dormitory complex on Purdue University's campus at 205 N Russell Street in West Lafayette, Indiana. It consists of five connected buildings: Duhme, Shealy, Warren, Wood, and Vawter Halls. Residents live in single, double, or triple rooms with shared community bathrooms. Windsor Dining Court is below Vawter and Warren Halls.

== History ==
Ladies Hall was the first all-female residence hall built on Purdue University's campus. It opened in 1874 and was demolished in 1927. Eight sorority houses were built in the 1910s and 1920s to house women students. The Windsor Hall complex was built between 1934 and 1951. Duhme Hall, originally called Women's Residence Hall South, was the first of the Windsor buildings to open in 1934.

In 1935, a year after Duhme Hall opened, Purdue had 800 female students out of 6,000 total students. By the 1939–1940 academic year, there were 1,272 undergraduate women enrolled and 61 female graduate students. In 2022, there were 21,634 female students and 29,250 male.

Purdue University did not permit African American women to live in the women's residence halls until 1947. Frieda Parker Jefferson and Winifred Parker White were the first to integrate Purdue's student housing. Ralph Gates, Indiana's governor, received one of the letters written as part of letter-writing campaign in support of integration from their father, Frederick Parker. Frieda Parker Hall and Winifred Parker Hall near the Windsor Residence Halls are named for the sisters.

Walter Scholer Sr., and his architectural firm, the Scholer Corporation, designed the Windsor Residence Halls. The walls of the buildings are English brick with Bedford stone trim in an English Tudor architectural style. All five residence halls became known collectively as Windsor Residence Halls on August 27, 1969.

=== Duhme Hall ===
Duhme Hall was dedicated on October 20, 1934. Originally named Women's Residence Hall South, it was renamed for Ophelia Fowler Duhme. In 1924 upon Duhme's death, Harriet Small received a tract of her land. Small donated funds from the land sale to the university to build a women's dormitory.

=== Shealy Hall ===
Shealy Hall was the second Women's Residence Hall, dedicated on January 10, 1937. Originally named North Hall or Women's Residence Halls Unit B, it was renamed Frances M. Shealy Residence Hall for three sisters: Frances, Emma, and Josephine Shealy of Delphi, Indiana. Above the front entrance to the building is a sculpture of a lion holding a shield in its paw.

=== Wood Hall ===
Wood Hall was originally named Women's Residence Hall West and was dedicated on October 14, 1939, as Elizabeth G. and William R. Wood Hall. Wood Hall was a PWA project.

=== Warren Hall ===
Warren Hall was built in 1951 as Women's Residence Hall D and dedicated on June 30, 1954, as Martha E. and Eugene K. Warren Hall. The Warrens gifted their stock in the West Lafayette Water Works to the university and the donation was used to partially fund the building.

=== Vawter Hall ===
Vawter Hall opened in 1951 as Women's Residence Hall E. On December 17, 1959, the building was dedicated and named for Everett B. Vawter. Vawter was a Tippecanoe County surveyor, West Lafayette city engineer, president of the West Lafayette Water Company, president of the Purdue State Bank, and led the West Lafayette Public Library Board. Vawter's son and daughter-in-law, Wallace and Helen Vawter, gifted 1,693 shares of West Lafayette Water Company stock, valued at $190,000, to the Purdue Research Foundation.

== Notable residents ==
In the mid-1930s, Purdue President Edward Elliott recruited Amelia Earhart and Lillian Gilbreth to join the Purdue University staff. Earhart served as a career consultant for women and as technical advisor for the Department of Aeronautics. Gilbreth was a Professor of Management with a part time role in the School of Home Economics at Purdue until her retirement in 1948. They lived in Women's Residence Hall South, now known as Duhme Hall. Earhart Hall, another dormitory on Purdue's campus, is named after Earhart. Janice Voss lived in Windsor while studying engineering science in the 1970s.

== Renovations ==
The residence halls underwent renovations to replace windows in 1990 and to comply with building codes and residential standards between 2008 and 2011. The dining hall underwent a $12 million renovation in 2005.
