= Purdue Memorial Union =

Purdue University Memorial Union
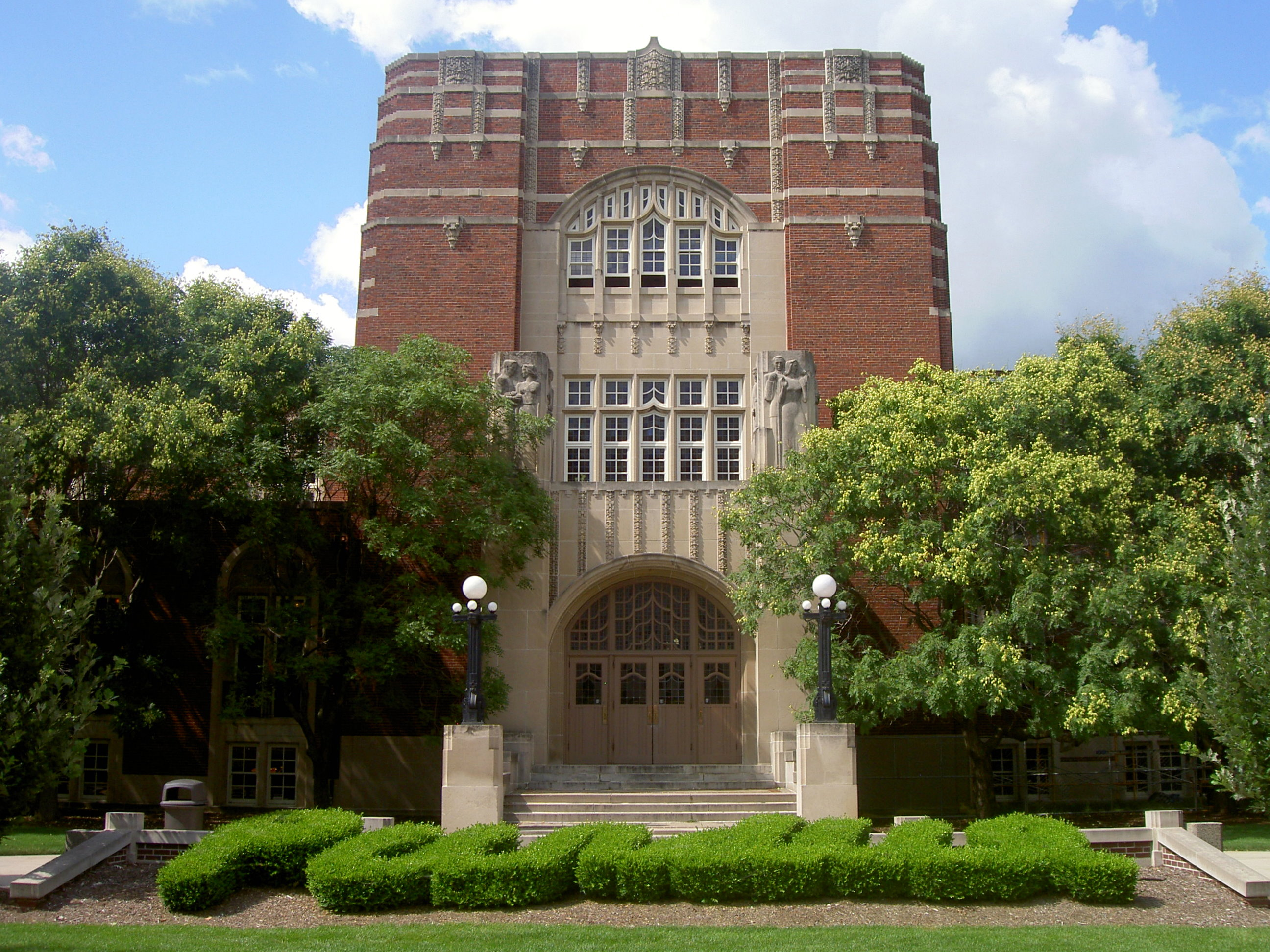
- Interactive map of the Purdue University; Memorial Union area

General information
- Type: Student union
- Location: 101 North Grant Street; West Lafayette, Indiana 47907-3574
- Coordinates: 40.4248°N 86.9110°W
- Construction started: June 13, 1922
- Completed: September 9, 1924
- Owner: Purdue University

Design and construction
- Architect: Pond and Pond
- Main contractor: A.E. Kemmer

Website
- www.union.purdue.edu

The Purdue Memorial Union (PMU) is a student union building located on the Purdue University campus in West Lafayette, Indiana, USA. It opened in 1924 as a memorial to the Purdue students who had fought in World War I. The building includes several restaurants, lounges, and student organization offices, as well as a bowling alley and a hotel.

== History ==
In the early 1900s, Purdue was in need of a place for students, staff, and visitors to gather in the Purdue community. The Class of 1912 began collecting funds to build a union for Purdue. Funds were collected until the start of World War I. Many men and women from Purdue had participated in the war, and some have died in it. It was decided that the union should be a memorial dedicated to those men and women. From then on, funds were collected to begin building the PMU.

== Building ==
The PMU was opened in 1924 before it was completely finished in 1929. In the basement, a bowling alley was built in 1936. The ground floor contains most of the Union's restaurants and coffee shops. On the main floor of the Union, there are student services as well as some lounges. There are two ballrooms where large groups can gather for special events. Located on this floor as well is the Great Hall of the Union. This is the memorial for Purdue men and women that have fought in the wars. A scale model of Purdue is located in the Great Hall of the Union. The second floor of the PMU contains many lounges and private offices.

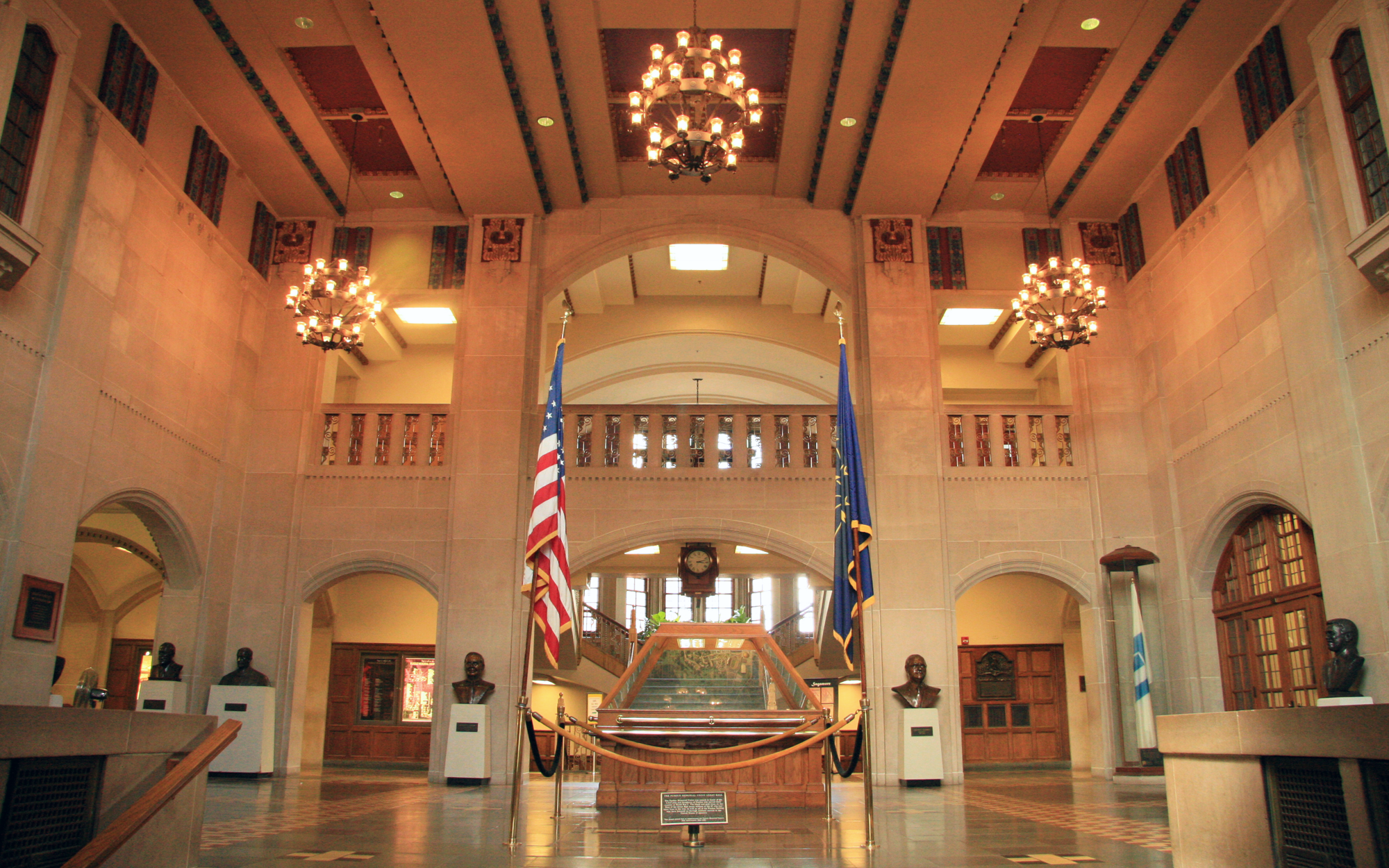
Great Hall, looking north

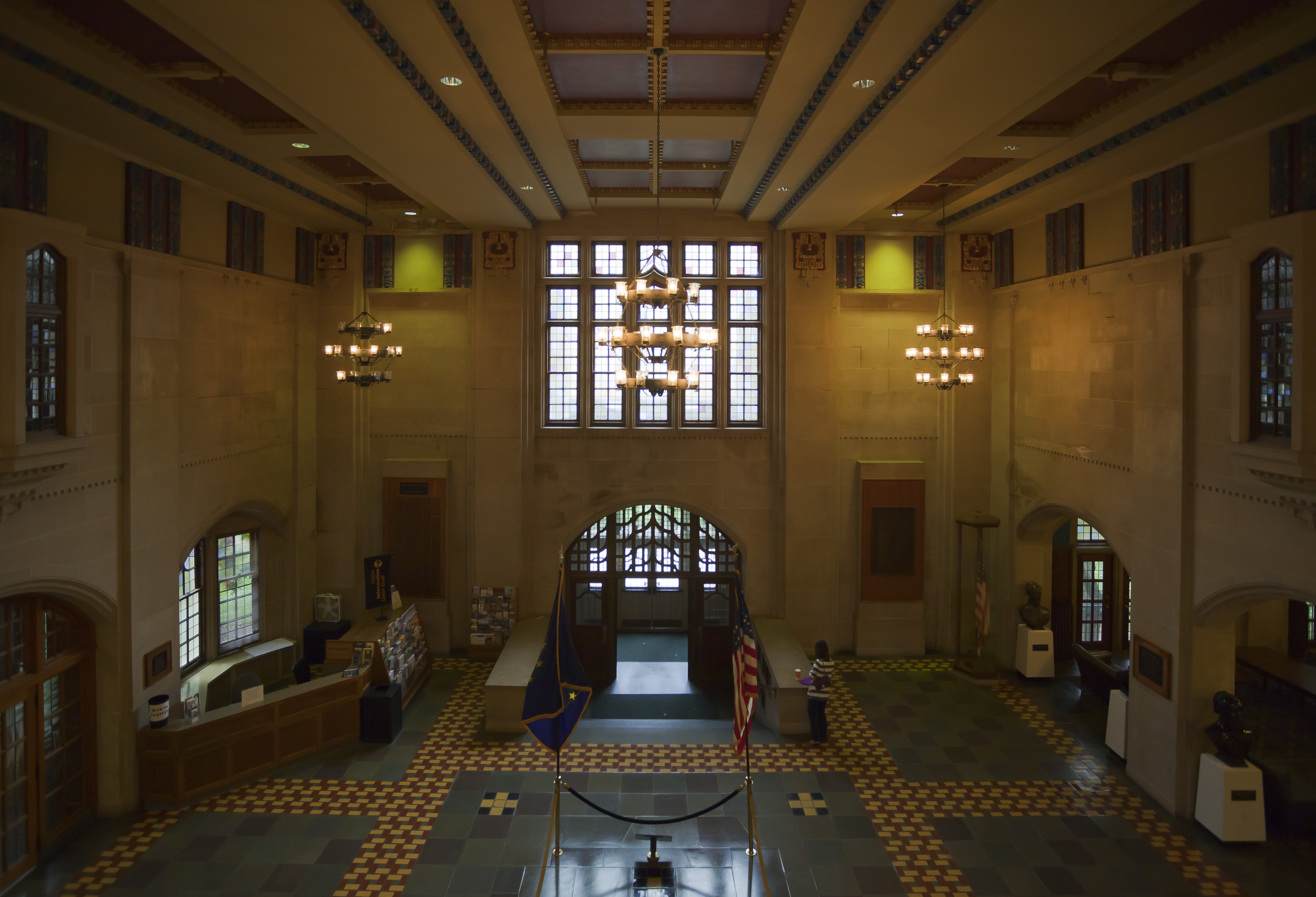
Great Hall, looking south

== Union Club Hotel ==
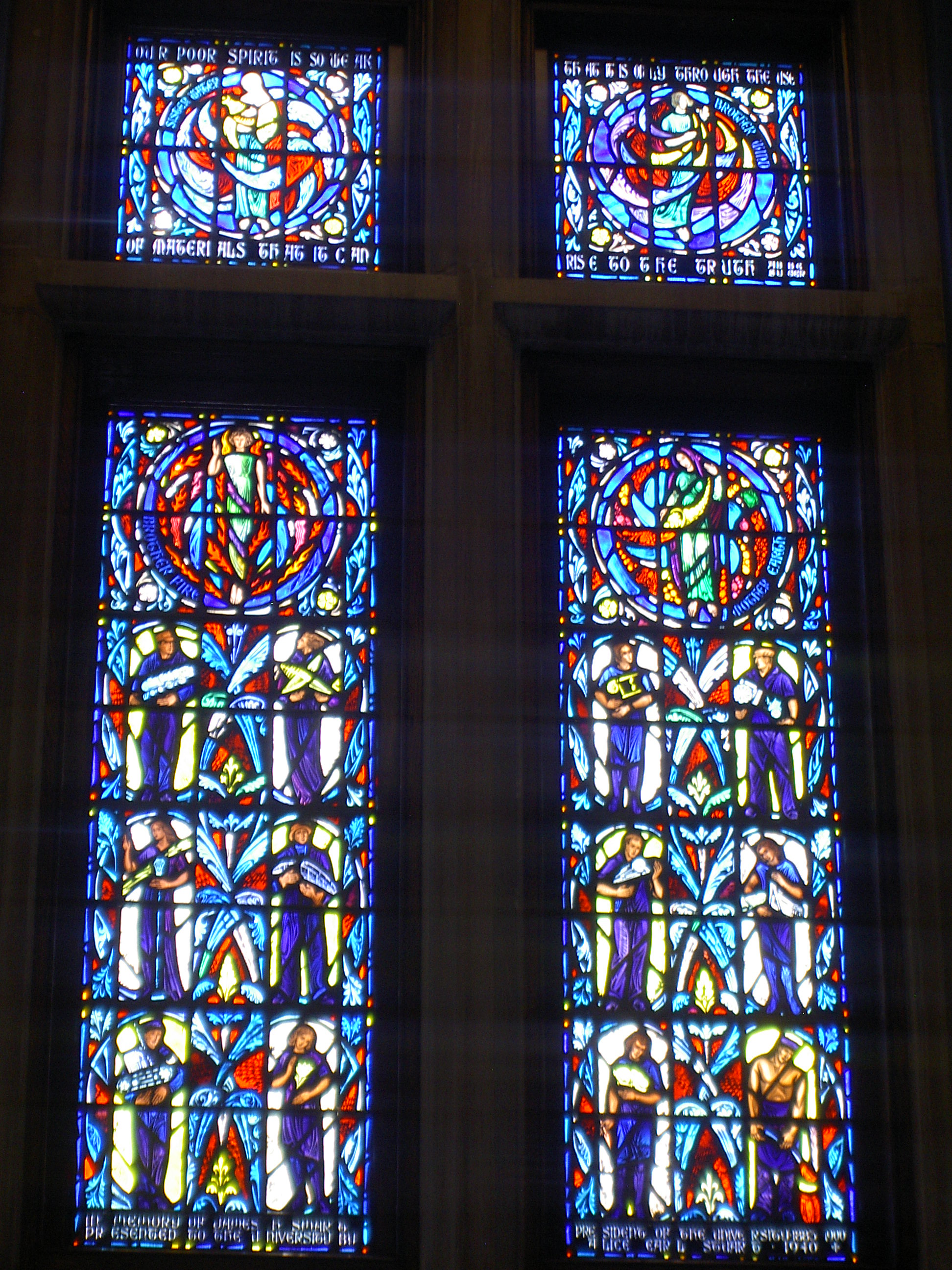
Memorial Hall stained glass in memory of president James H. Smart.

The first part of the Union Club Hotel was built in 1929. Since then, it has grown into a full-service hotel.

== Union Rack & Roll ==
The Union Rack & Roll is the bowling alley located in the basement of the PMU.

== Services ==
The PMU offers a variety of services to students, staff, and visitors as well. There are financial offices, student services, as well as many restaurants.

== Purdue Student Union Board ==
The Purdue Student Union Board (PSUB) is a student organization that provides programs and services for students, staff, and the community of West Lafayette. PSUB was an organization before the union was built and it helped fund the building. In 1920 when the organization started it had only a few members, but it now has over a hundred.
