= James L. Mohler =

James Mohler is a urologist at Roswell Park. Mohler joined Roswell Park in 2003 as Chair of Urology and Leader of the Prostate Program. He became the associate director and Senior Vice President for Translational Research. He is Chair Emeritus, Urology, and Chief, Inter-Institutional Academics, and Professor of Oncology at Roswell Park Comprehensive Cancer Center, and adjunct professor of Urology and Member of UNC-Lineberger Comprehensive Cancer Center at University of North Carolina.

== Education ==
Dr. James Larue Mohler completed his medical degrees from Georgia Medical College, and further he went to the University of Kentucky Medical Center for his residency training in surgery and urology. later he was a scholar of an American Urological Association Scholar(fellow) in Urologic Oncology at Johns Hopkins University School of Medicine. He was a Fellow of the American College of Surgeons. He was also a Diplomate of the National Board of Medical Examiners and the American Board of Urology.

== Awards and honors ==
- NCCN Rodger Winn Foundation Award - 2017
- Society for Basic Urologic Research Distinguished Service Award - 2012

== Publications ==
His research has been published in various medical journals.

- Surgical skill level classification model development using EEG and eye-gaze data and machine learning algorithms
- Microbial Biofilm: A Review on Formation, Infection, Antibiotic Resistance, Control Measures, and Innovative Treatment
- Developing surgical skill level classification model using visual metrics and a gradient boosting algorithm
