= VEISHEA =

Celebration held at Iowa State University

The VEISHEA logo displays many traditions of the celebration of and Iowa State University

VEISHEA (pronounced "VEE-sha") was an annual week-long celebration held each spring on the campus of Iowa State University in Ames, Iowa. The celebration featured a parade and many open-house demonstrations of the university facilities and departments. Campus organizations exhibited products and technologies and held fund raisers for various charity groups. In addition, VEISHEA brought speakers, lecturers, and entertainers to Iowa State. Throughout its over eight-decade history it hosted such guests as Bob Hope, John Wayne, Presidents Harry Truman, Ronald Reagan, and Lyndon Johnson, and performers Diana Ross, Mike Jones (rapper), Billy Joel, Sonny and Cher, the Goo Goo Dolls, The Tony Bruno Band, and The Black Eyed Peas. VEISHEA was the largest student run festival in the nation, bringing in tens of thousands of visitors to the campus each year.

A 2014 disturbance led ISU President Steven Leath to suspend VEISHEA, and in August 2014 Leath announced that VEISHEA was being permanently discontinued with the VEISHEA name being retired.

The name of the festival was an acronym for the colleges of the university that existed when the festival was founded in 1922:

- Veterinary Medicine
- Engineering
- Industrial Science
- Home Economics
- Agriculture.

The Iowa State Daily, the university's student newspaper, has spelled VEISHEA as an acronym and as a word, with only the first letter capitalized. Official university paraphernalia regarding the event still put it in full caps, per the trademark owned by VEISHEA and maintained by Iowa State University Trademark Licensing.

== Beginning and history ==
In the early 1900s, the campus of what was then known as Iowa State College was host to multiple events in the spring, as each college celebrated its history and recruited prospective students by holding an individual celebration—such as the Ag Carnival, the Home Economists' "HEC Day," and the Engineers' St. Patrick's Day Parade. In 1922 it was decided that by combining the separate celebrations, it would be possible to preserve tradition without students taking time off from several consecutive weeks of class. Additionally, a large celebration would be a more effective advertisement for the university than several small celebrations. Professor Frank "Shorty" Paine conceptualized the name "VEISHEA" to allow the combined event to pay homage to each of the colleges and celebrations from which it sprang.

VEISHEA was, since its inception, a wholly student run event. The first VEISHEA Central Committee, led by Wallace McKee of the class of 1922 met in Beardshear Hall, since the Memorial Union (where student organization offices are currently housed) was not yet built. After months of planning, the first VEISHEA was held May 11–13, 1922. The event managed to combine highlights of each college celebration into one showcase of the entire Iowa State College. Longstanding traditions which became part of VEISHEA included the May Queen pageant, the knighting of senior Engineering students into the Knights of the Order of St. Patrick, and the traditional vaudeville show of the Ag Carnival. Other events included 33 department open houses, a mock battle hosted by the ROTC, a parade themed "History of Iowa State as it is Today," and the student written and performed "Nite Show," titled "Scandals of 1922."

== Traditions ==
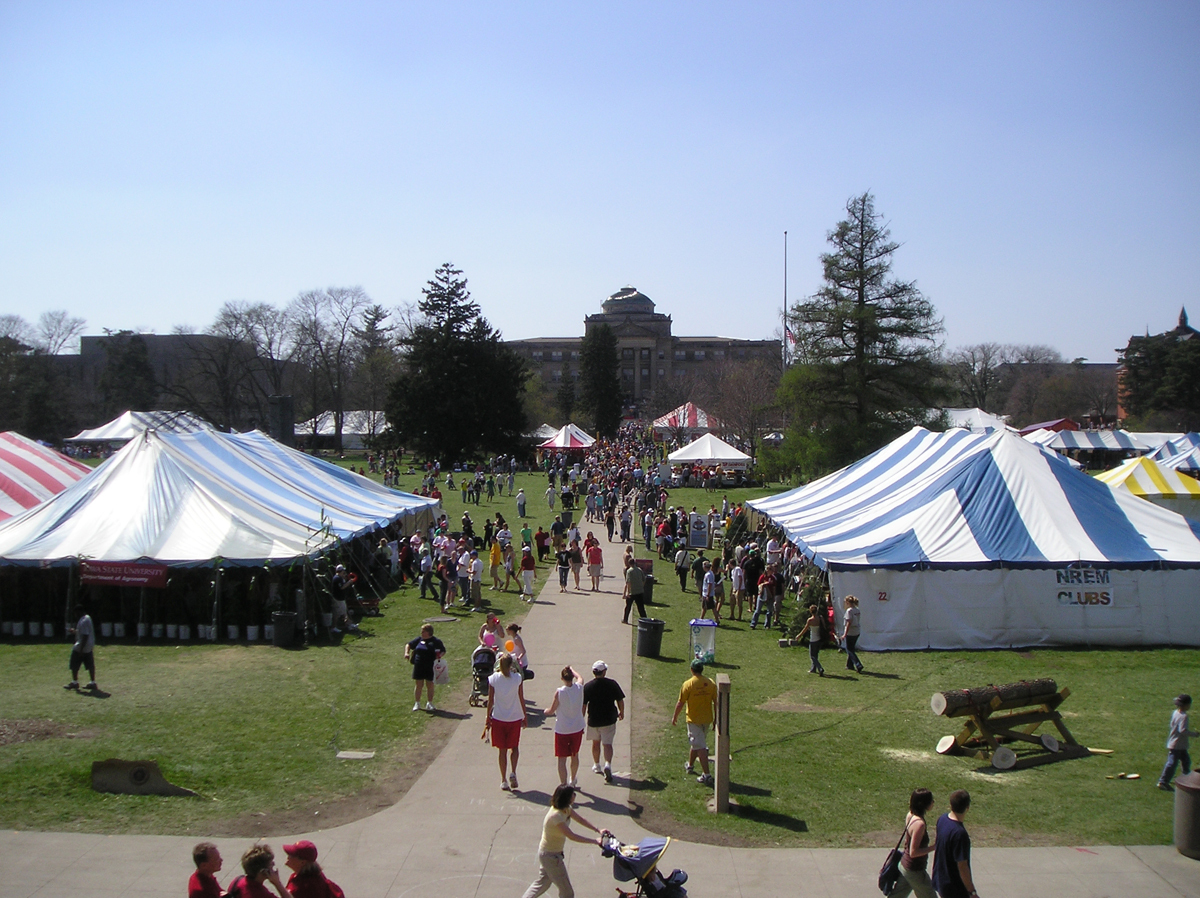
Visitors browse the hundreds of activities and displays put on by Iowa State University student organizations and departments during VEISHEA Village 2007.

VEISHEA encompassed many of the same traditions and ideals embodied in the original 1922 celebration, as well as newer traditions focused on celebrating the Iowa State community. Some of these traditions included:

- VEISHEA Village – VEISHEA Saturday was host to open houses, a cultural festival, an international food fair, and carnival games for children all grouped under the banner of VEISHEA Village. Booths on campus included demonstrations of science and agriculture, refreshments, and entertainment. All together, over 80 departments, clubs, and student groups participated in VEISHEA .
- Stars Over VEISHEA – Originally a yearly student-written musical called the Nite Show, in 1930 the directors decided to transition to instead perform Broadway classics. The show was then moved outside to Clyde Willams field in 1939 and renamed Stars Over VEISHEA (or SOV). In later years SOV became a joint production of VEISHEA and Iowa State Theatre, so the show was no longer produced and directed by students, but students still participated in all aspects of the show's planning and performance.
- Parade – What began in 1922 as a parade of floats built by departmental clubs. blossomed into one of the highlights of the VEISHEA celebration, with attendance estimates sometimes reaching as high as 75,000 people. The later manifestation of the parade includes balloons, student groups, marching bands, and dancers, as well as the traditional floats. The parade was led by the Grand Marshal, who is traditionally a distinguished guest.
- Swans – In 1935, the VEISHEA Central Committee donated a pair of swans to Lake LaVerne, the lake at the base of the Memorial Union. After a naming contest, they were christened Lancelot and Elaine. More than 70 years later, Lancelot and Elaine (albeit different swans) continue to be a fixture on campus. For this reason, the swan was one of VEISHEA's symbols, and was represented in the current VEISHEA logo.
- Cherry pies – A tradition older than VEISHEA itself, the Division of Home Economics began selling cherry pies as a fundraiser in 1919. Now sponsored by the Department of Apparel, Events, & Hospitality Management, approximately 12,000 cherry pies were made and sold each year, with the money going to support departmental scholarships.

== Problems ==
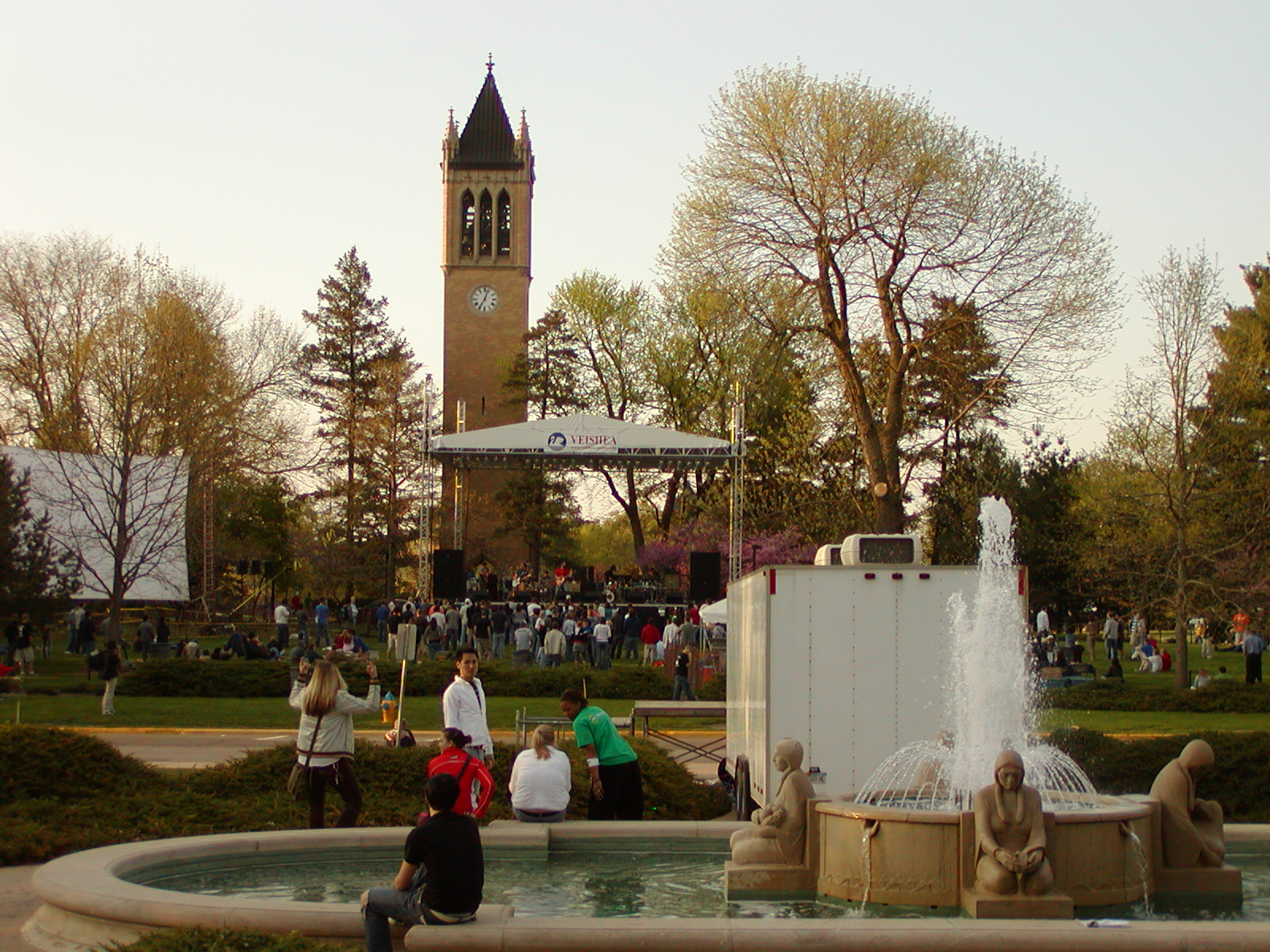
The VEISHEA 2006 Battle of the Bands was held on campus, per the recommendations of the 2004 Task Force.

In later years, rioting and disturbances tarnished the VEISHEA celebration. Riots marred the event in 1988, 1992 and 1994. During the 1997 VEISHEA festival, Harold "Uri" Sellers, a VEISHEA visitor was murdered in a stabbing on the front lawn at Adelante Fraternity by another VEISHEA visitor, Michael Runyan.

In 2004, a riot occurred during the early morning hours of April 18 after Ames Police dispersed about 400 people at a nuisance party. This crowd grew, intensified, and eventually became violent, eventually causing more than $250,000 in damage to public and private property.

Following the disturbance, some students made claims that police used excessive force in controlling rioters. However, a nine-month investigation by the Iowa Attorney General's office found no wrongdoing on the part of police.

The 2004 riots marred what had been a highly successful celebration. On April 27, ISU president Gregory L. Geoffroy announced that VEISHEA would not be held in 2005. This was met with disappointment, both on and off campus. One man who had his business damaged had taken out a full-page ad asking the school not to cancel the event. Geoffroy also announced the formation of a task force to study the causes of the riots.

2005 marked the first time in 82 years that VEISHEA was not held.

VEISHEA's return in 2006, as well as celebrations in 2007 and 2008, were incident-free. Much of the credit was given to the implementation of new policies recommended by the riot task force, including:

- On Campus Events – Events were moved onto campus and away from the flashpoint that was created by the mix of bars and student housing in Campustown.
- Police-Student Relations – Police have implemented yearly campaigns to build relationships between students and the police, including running ads and giving out free T-shirts.

In 2014, a riot occurred in the early morning of April 9, with one reported injury. In response, Iowa State president Steven Leath suspended the remainder of the 2014 VEISHEA celebrations and created a task force to discuss the future of VEISHEA.

In early June, the task force voted unanimously to recommend ending VEISHEA in its current form. On June 13, 2014, the task force voted to recommend that the school continue to have an "overarching, university-wide event." However, the task force also recommended it not be called VEISHEA.

On August 7, 2014, President Leath announced that VEISHEA would no longer be held, and the VEISHEA name was being retired. He said some events that had been associated with VEISHEA likely would continue, but the time frame and content would have to be evaluated.
