= List of presidents of Iowa State University =

Following are presidents of Iowa State University.

== Presidents of Iowa State University ==
The following persons have served as president of Iowa State University:

No.	Image	President	Term start	Term end	Ref.
Principals of Iowa Agricultural College and Model Farm (1858–1898)
1		Adonijah S. Welch	1868	1883	
acting		George W. Jones	1868	1868	
acting		James L. Geddes	1877	1878	
acting		Charles E. Bessey	1882	1882	
2		Seaman A. Knapp	1883	1884	
acting		Joseph L. Budd	1884	1885	
3		Leigh S. J. Hunt	February 1885	July 1886	
4		William I. Chamberlain	July 1886	November 1890	
5		William M. Beardshear	February 1891	August 5, 1902 (Note: Died in office.)	
Presidents of Iowa State College of Agriculture and Mechanic Arts (1898–1959)
acting		Edgar W. Stanton	August 23, 1902	September 1, 1903	
6		Albert B. Storms	September 1, 1903	August 31, 1910	
acting		Edgar W. Stanton	August 31, 1910	July 31, 1912	
7		Raymond A. Pearson	August 1, 1912	August 31, 1926 (Note: Resigned to head University of Maryland, College Park.)	
acting		Edgar W. Stanton	1917	1918	
acting		Herman Knapp (Note: business manager and treasurer the college)	September 1, 1926	August 31, 1927	
8		Raymond M. Hughes	September 1, 1927	March 17, 1936 (Note: Hughes began indefinite leave of absence in October 1935 until he was formally replaced in March 1936)	
acting		Charles E. Friley	October 18, 1935	March 17, 1936	
9		Charles E. Friley	March 17, 1936	June 30, 1953	
10		James H. Hilton	July 1, 1953	June 30, 1965	
Presidents of Iowa State University (1959–present)
11		W. Robert Parks	July 1, 1965	June 30, 1986	
12		Gordon P. Eaton	July 1, 1986	October 19, 1990 (Note: Resigned to head Lamont-Doherty Geological Observatory and return to scientific research.)	
acting		Milton D. Glick (Note: Provost at time of appointment.)	October 20, 1990	May 31, 1991	
13		Martin C. Jischke	June 1, 1991	August 13, 2000 (Note: Resigned to head Purdue University.)	
interim		Richard C. Seagrave (Note: At time of appointment, just complete stint as interim provost.)	August 14, 2000	June 30, 2001	
14		Gregory Geoffroy	July 1, 2001	January 31, 2012	
15		Steven Leath	February 1, 2012	May 8, 2017 (Note: Resigned to head Auburn University.)	
interim		Benjamin J. Allen (Note: Retired president of University of Northern Iowa at time of appointment.)	May 9, 2017	November 19, 2017	
16		Wendy Wintersteen	November 20, 2017	January 2, 2026	
interim		David Spalding (Note: Raisbeck Endowed Dean of the Ivy College of Business and vice president for economic development and industry relations at time of appointment.)	January 3, 2026	February 28, 2026	
17		David J. Cook	March 1, 2026	present	

Table notes:

== See also ==
- List of leaders of universities and colleges in the United States
