= Volcanic island =

Island of volcanic origin

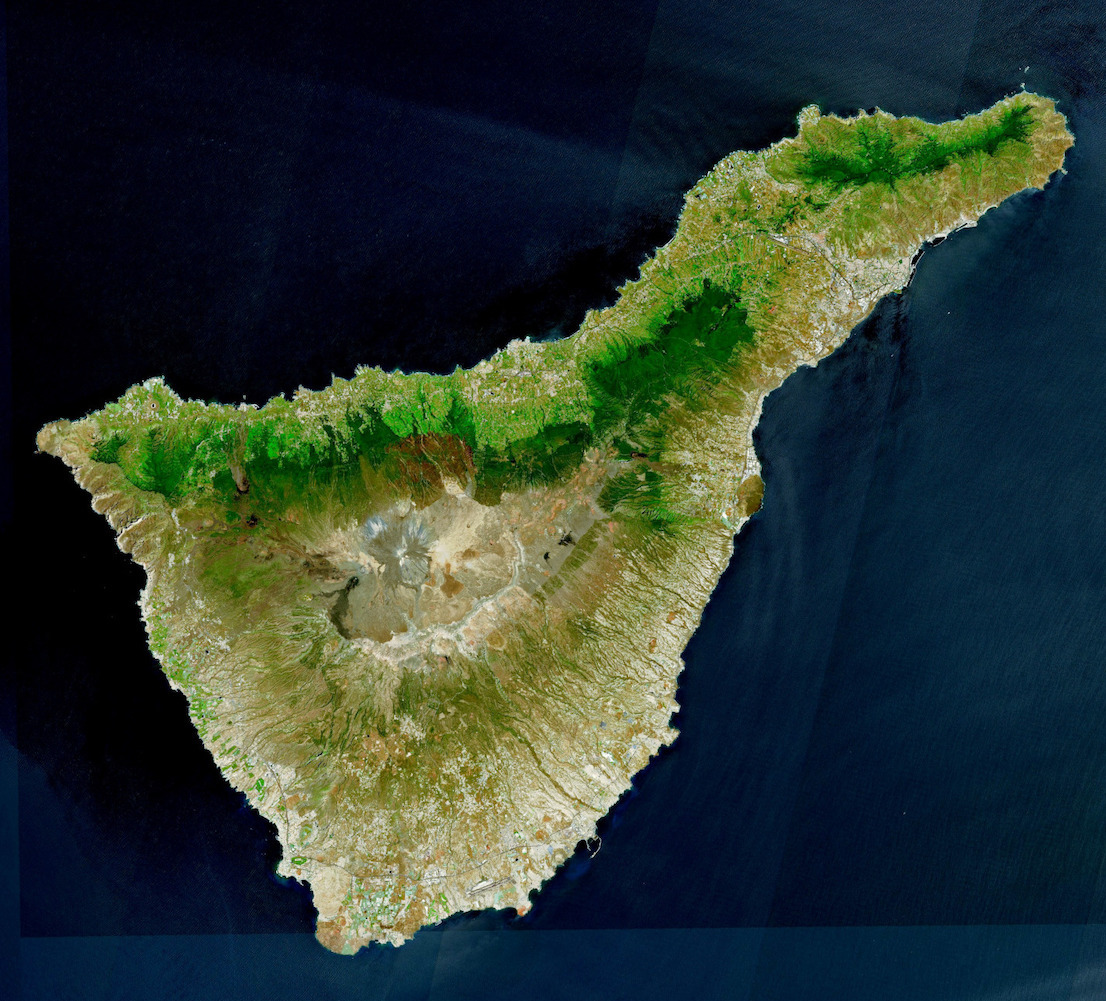
Tenerife is the largest island of the Canary archipelago, and home to the Teide, highest peak in Spain.

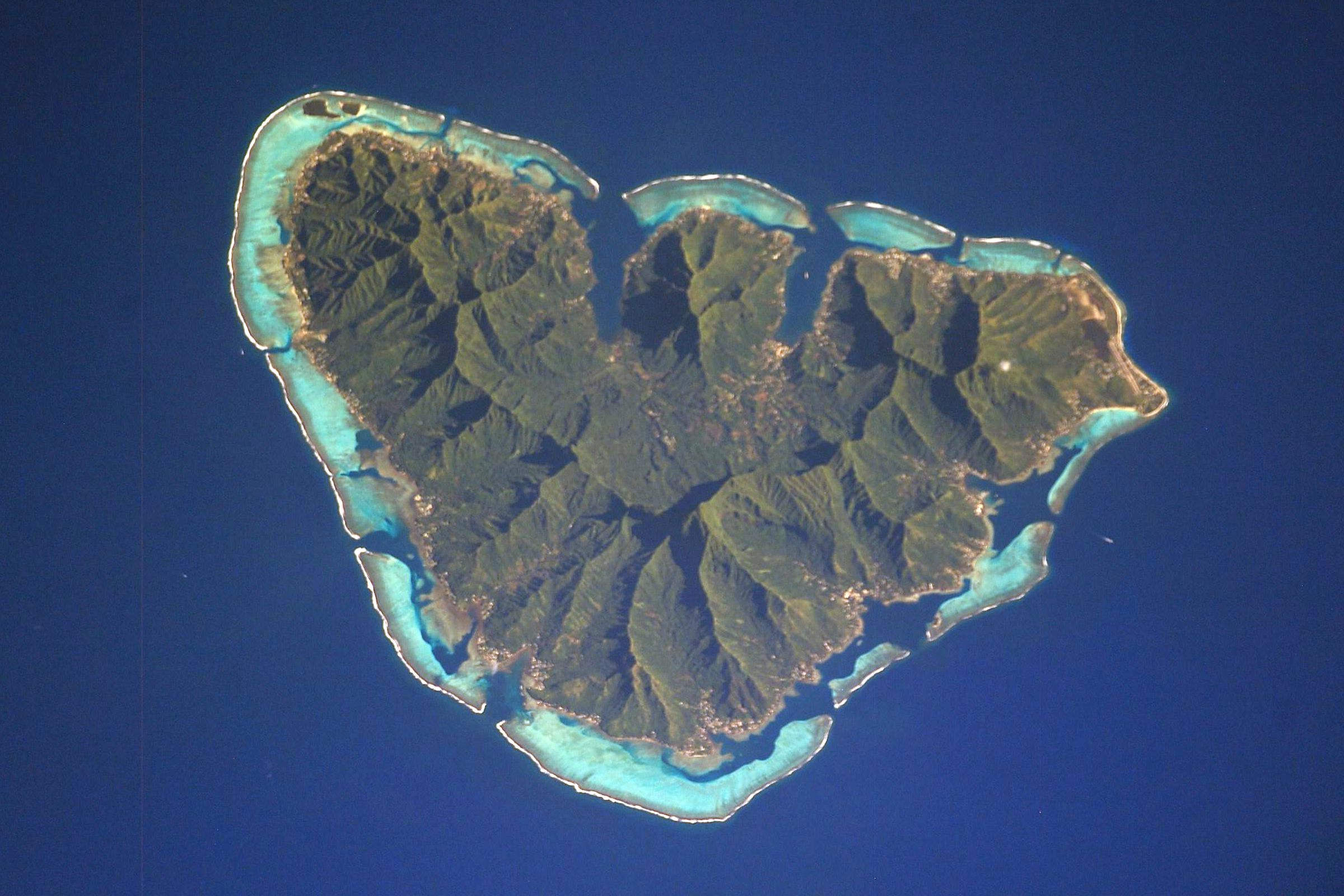
Moʼorea, French Polynesia, a volcanic island where the central island is still prominent

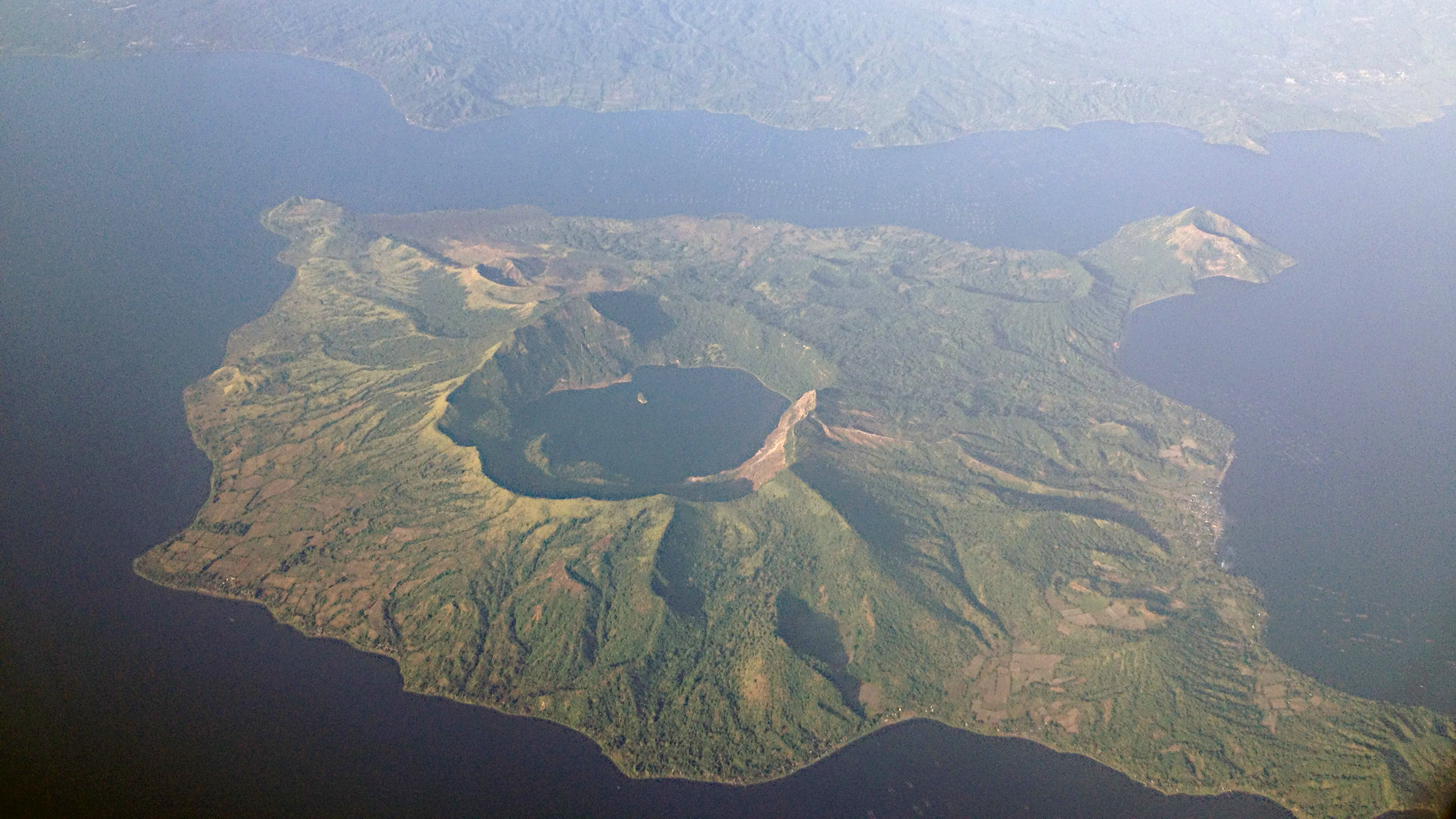
Taal Volcano, Philippines

Geologically, a volcanic island is an island of volcanic origin. The term high island can be used to distinguish such islands from low islands, which are formed from sedimentation or the uplifting of coral reefs (which have often formed on sunken volcanoes).

== Definition and origin ==
There are a number of volcanic islands that rise no more than 1 metre (3 ft 3 in) above sea level, often classified as islets or rocks, while some low islands, such as Banaba, Henderson Island, Makatea, Naoero, and Niue, rise over 50 metres (160 ft) above sea level.

The two types of islands are often found in proximity to each other, especially among the islands of the South Pacific Ocean, where low islands are found on the fringing reefs that surround most volcanic islands. Volcanic islands normally rise above a hotspot or subduction zone.

== Habitability ==
Volcanic islands usually range in size between 1 and 104 square kilometres (0.4 and 40 sq mi). Islands above a certain size usually have fresh groundwater, while low islands often do not, so volcanic islands are more likely to be habitable.

Many volcanic islands emerge from the deep abyss of the ocean, and feature rough or mountainous landscapes in their interiors and a diverse array of summit elevations. Researchers have observed that the island will often be covered by dense tropical forest. These limit settlement on the interior of many islands, forcing communities to develop along the coast. Larger islands may have rivers, resulting in flood hazards. Rivers deliver sediment downstream, which can dominate the shape of the coast and contribute to erosion. Tall volcanic islands are often surrounded by protective fringing or barrier reefs, creating lagoons.

The unique geological and geographical characteristics of volcanic islands make them prone to many natural hazards, which are expected to worsen due to climate change. These include volcanic eruptions, earthquakes, tsunamis, landslides, and severe weather events like hurricanes or typhoons. Studies have highlighted the importance of implementing effective risk mitigation plans that include nature-based solutions to improve societal safety on these islands. These involve leveraging natural processes and ecosystems to reduce hazard impacts. This can include the restoration of natural barriers like mangroves or coral reefs that protect against tsunamis and storm surges or the maintenance of natural water catchments that can mitigate flood risks.

== See also ==
- Archipelagic apron – Fan-shaped gently sloping region of sea floor found around oceanic islands
- Atoll – Ring-shaped coral reef
- Canary Islands – Spanish archipelago off the coast of Northwest Africa
- Galápagos Islands – Ecuadorian volcanic archipelago
- Guyot – Flat-topped underwater mountain
- Krakatoa Archipelago – Archipelago in the Sunda Strait, Indonesia
- Seamount – Mountain rising from the ocean seafloor that does not reach the water's surface
- Submarine landslide – Landslides that transport sediment across the continental shelf and into the deep ocean
- Volcanic arc – Chain of volcanoes formed above a subducting plate
