= Mark Nook =

University President

Mark A. Nook

11th President of the University of Northern Iowa
- Incumbent
- Assumed office February 1, 2017
- Preceded by: William Ruud

3rd Chancellor of Montana State University Billings
- In office 2014–2017
- Preceded by: Rolf Groseth
- Succeeded by: Ronald Larsen (interim); Dan Edelman

Personal details
- Born: Estherville, Iowa, U.S.
- Spouse: Cheryl Nook
- Education: Southwest Minnesota State University (BA); Iowa State University (MS); University of Wisconsin–Madison (PhD)
- Website: https://president.uni.edu

Mark A. Nook is the 11th president of the University of Northern Iowa. Prior to this, he was the chancellor of Montana State University Billings.

== Education ==
Mark Nook was born in Estherville, Iowa and graduated from Holstein Community School in Holstein, Iowa. He earned a bachelor's degree in physics and mathematics from Southwest Minnesota State University in 1980, a master's degree in astrophysics from Iowa State Universityin 1983, and a Ph.D. in astronomy from the University of Wisconsin–Madison in 1990.

== Career ==
Nook began teaching physics and astronomy at Concordia College in 1983, where he was an instructor until 1986. Following this, he worked on the Wisconsin Ultraviolet Photo-Polarimeter Experiment until 1990. In 1990, Nook accepted a position as assistant professor of physics and astronomy and director of the university's observatory and planetarium at St. Cloud State University, eventually becoming a full professor in 1998. He served in this position until 2007. He served as the chair of the department of physics, astronomy, and engineering science from 1999 to 2004. He additionally served as the dean of undergraduate studies from 2004 to 2007. From 2007 to 2009, and again from 2010 to 2011, he served as the provost and vice chancellor for academic affairs at University of Wisconsin-Stevens Point, serving as the interim chancellor 2009 to 2010. Nook served as the senior vice president for academic and student affairs for the University of Wisconsin System from 2011 to 2014. In 2014 Nook was appointed the chancellor of Montana State University Billings, serving in that role until January 2017. He currently serves as the 11th president of the University of Northern Iowa. He was inducted into Omicron Delta Kappa at the University of Northern Iowa as a faculty/staff initiate in 2017. He was appointed to the board of directors for the American Association of State Colleges and Universities in 2023 and the American Association of Colleges for Teacher Education in 2022. On October 23, 2026 Nook announced he would be retiring in July of 2027.

Academic offices
Preceded by William Ruud	President of the University of Northern Iowa; 2017 -	Incumbent
Preceded by Rolf Groseth	Chancellor of Montana State University Billings; 2014 -2017	Succeeded by Ron Larsen
Preceded by Rebecca Martin	Senior Vice President for Academic and Student Affairs of the University of Wisconsin System; 2011 - 2014	Succeeded by David Ward
