= Wendy Wintersteen =

American entomologist and academic administrator

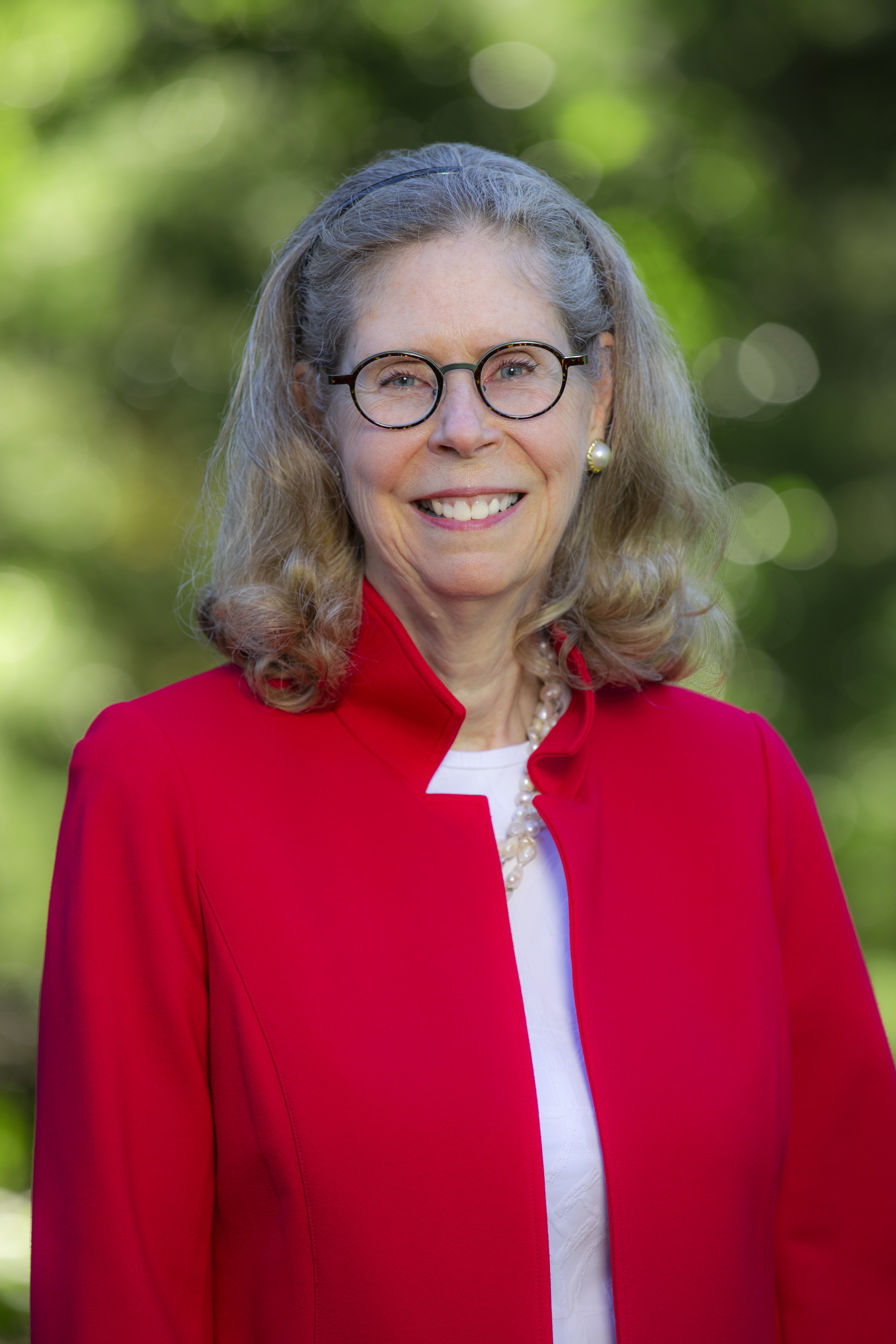
- Wintersteen in 2020

16th President of Iowa State University
- In office November 20, 2017 – January 2, 2026
- Preceded by: Benjamin J. Allen (acting); Steven Leath
- Succeeded by: David Spalding (acting); David J. Cook

Personal details
- Spouse: Robert Waggoner (m. 1984)
- Education: Kansas State University (BS); Iowa State University (PhD)
- Scientific career
- Fields: Entomology
- Institutions: United States Department of Agriculture; Iowa State University
- Thesis: Degradation of the stored grain protectant malathion as a function of drying systems and storage temperatures (1988)
- Doctoral advisor: David E. Foster

Wendy Kay Wintersteen is an American academic administrator who served as the 16th president of Iowa State University.

== Education ==
Wintersteen received her bachelor's degree in crop protection from Kansas State University in 1978, and began at Iowa State University the next year, working for Iowa State University Extension in eastern Iowa. Wintersteen was one of the first women hired to work in integrated pest management for ISU Extension. She earned a Ph.D in entomology from ISU in 1988.

== Career ==
From 1989 to 1990, Wintersteen was director of the National Pesticide Education Program. She became a professor of entomology at Iowa State University in 1996, and has also served as the director of the Agriculture and Natural Resources program and associate director of the Iowa Agriculture and Home Economics Experiment Station. Wintersteen was appointed the dean of the College of Agriculture and Life Sciences in 2006, and became the first endowed dean at Iowa State. She was one of four finalists to succeed Steven Leath as president of Iowa State University, and, in October 2017, was appointed to the position by the Iowa Board of Regents, becoming the first woman to take office as Iowa State University president. Wintersteen's installation ceremony took place on September 21, 2018. In 2019, Wintersteen's contract as president was extended by the Iowa Board of Regents through 2023. In 2022, her contract was again extended through 2024. On May 16, 2025, she announced plans to retire in January 2026, pending the appointment of the next president.

Wintersteen formerly served on the board of trustees of the Farm Foundation and was on the board of directors of the U.S.-Israel Binational Agricultural Research and Development Fund from 2012 to 2017. She also serves on the Big 12 Conference Board of Directors.

== Personal ==
Wintersteen married Robert Waggoner in 1984.
