= Benjamin J. Allen =

American academic

9th President of the University of Northern Iowa
- In office June 5, 2006 – May 30, 2013
- Preceded by: Robert Koob
- Succeeded by: William Ruud

Acting President of Iowa State University
- In office May 9, 2017 – November 20, 2017
- Preceded by: Steven Leath
- Succeeded by: Wendy Wintersteen

Personal details
- Born: Benjamin Joseph Allen; January 5, 1947 (age 79)
- Spouse: Pat Allen
- Education: Indiana University (BS); University of Illinois, Urbana-Champaign (MA, PhD)
- Profession: University administrator, professor

Benjamin Joseph Allen (born January 5, 1947) is an American academic who served as president of the University of Northern Iowa (UNI) from 2006 to 2013. It was announced on March 24, 2017 that Allen would begin serving as interim president for Iowa State University on May 9 after former president Steven Leath announced he would be leaving for Auburn University.

== Education ==
Allen received his Bachelor of Science degree in business economics from Indiana University Bloomington in 1969 and Master of Arts (1973) and Ph.D. (1974) in economics from the University of Illinois at Urbana–Champaign.

== Career ==
Allen taught at Washington State University from 1974 to 1979 and was a Brookings Economic Policy Fellow in the Office of Transportation Regulatory Policy at the U.S. Department of Transportation from 1976 to 1977. Allen joined the faculty of Iowa State University in 1979. In the 1986–87 academic year, Allen was the Visiting McKinley Professor of Economics and Public Utilities at the University of Illinois. Allen then held the Oren Harris Chair in Transportation at the University of Arkansas during the 1990-91 academic year. From 1984 to 1988 then 1991 to 2002, Allen was a professor at Iowa State in the departments of economics and transportation. Allen chaired the Iowa State University Department of Transportation and Logistics from 1984 to 1988 and was dean of the Iowa State University College of Business from 1994 to 2000.

Allen was vice president for academic affairs and provost at Iowa State University from 2002 to 2006, succeeding Rollin C. Richmond, who went on to be president of Humboldt State University. At Iowa State, he was named the first University Distinguished Professor in Business.

=== University of Northern Iowa ===
He was named the ninth president of the University of Northern Iowa on April 28, 2006, and assumed his duties on June 5, 2006.

In 2007, President Allen was appointed by two state college associations (the American Association of State Colleges and Universities and the National Association of State Universities and Land-Grant Colleges) to the Presidential Advisory Committee for the National Commission of University Accountability.

Under his leadership, the University of Northern Iowa established its priorities of increasing student achievement in undergraduate programs and providing statewide leadership in Pre-K through 12 education, including UNI's lead role in the Iowa Mathematics and Science Education Partnership with Iowa State University and the University of Iowa. During his time as president, the ninth United States Secretary of Education, Arne Duncan, the 14th Dalai Lama, and Michelle Obama visited and gave speeches at the campus.

President Allen is co-chair of the Institute for Tomorrow's Workforce, a non-profit educational foundation created to help prepare all Iowa learners for the 21st century global marketplace. He is an ex-officio board member of the Iowa Department of Economic Development, and he co-chairs the education subcommittee of the Iowa Business Council, composed of education and business executives committed to enhancing Iowa's economic vitality. A staunch supporter of the local community, President Allen is a member of the executive committee of the Greater Cedar Valley Alliance. He is a director for Heartland Express Company.

President Allen was diagnosed with prostate cancer on November 15, 2010 and took a leave of absence starting on February 7, 2011. Provost Gloria Gibson served in the role of Interim President during the absence. President Allen underwent a routine procedure and made a full recovery.

On February 29, 2012, the Teacher Education Faculty at the University of Northern Iowa voted 15-1 (with one abstention) to support a motion of no confidence in President Allen, Provost Gloria Gibson, and the Iowa Board of Regents. Their vote was a protest of the decision-making process in President Allen's recommendation to the Board of Regents to close the Malcolm Price Laboratory School/Northern University High School, effective June 30, 2012. On March 2, 2012, the university faculty voted 197-53 in support of a motion of no confidence in President Allen. Speakers cited the lack of faculty consultation in the decision making process to close the Price Lab School, and several academic programs on campus. On March 15, 2012, the American Association of University Professors (AAUP) said they would investigate reports that the UNI administration had violated rules of academic governance in making budget cuts and firing faculty, and that their probe could lead to a formal censure of the university by the AAUP.

=== Criticism ===
On October 24, 2012, Allen released an online statement regarding a student in a psychology course at UNI. The student, a member of the Iowa National Guard, would not be able to be in class on the day of an exam due to the requirements of the Guard, and spoke briefly with professor Cathy DeSoto, who said she would look into the university policy for military service which caused missed classes, but that the standard missed-class policy would apply. The student later filed a standard grievance, as DeSoto had recommended.

In his statement, Allen went on to write: "As university president and a veteran, I strongly disagree with the decision made by the professor in this case. We have been working with the student involved from the beginning, and continue to work with him to help ensure he won't be penalized for serving his country." Allen released this statement before speaking with DeSoto, and no penalty was or has been placed on the student in the case. Yet Allen's statement led to angry calls and emails to DeSoto and her family, as well as vandalism of her car, such that DeSoto needed a police escort.

A letter from American Association of University Professors (AAUP) President Rudy Fichtenbaum questioned Allen's handling of the case: "The media response, which unfairly and falsely characterized Professor DeSoto's actions, was a direct result of your premature and provocative press release. As a consequence of your actions, Professor DeSoto and members of her family received numerous threatening e-mails and phone calls."
