= The Northern Iowan =

University of Northern Iowa student newspaper

- Type: Student newspaper
- School: University of Northern Iowa
- Headquarters: Cedar Falls, Iowa
- Website: northerniowan.com

The Northern Iowan is a student newspaper at the University of Northern Iowa (UNI). It is published weekly on Wednesdays and distributed around the UNI campus, College Hill, and downtown Cedar Falls free of charge. The paper publishes articles on campus news and events, the university's sports programs, and student opinion pieces. The name of the paper has changed over the years. It was called the Students Offering from 1888–1889, the Normal Eye from 1892–1911, the College Eye from 1911–1967, and the Northern Iowan from 1967–present.

In 1967, the newspaper was at the center of a public furor over the newspaper's publication of an article by a young English professor, Edward Hoffmans, criticizing the draft and advocating for an end to the Vietnam War.

In 2021, the Northern Iowan introduced NI en Español, a regular section of campus news in the Spanish language, for Spanish readers.

In 2022, the student newspaper celebrated its 130th anniversary.

== Honors ==
- First class honors from the National Scholastic Press Association in 1932.
- All-American honors from the National Scholastic Press Association in 1933.
- Best all-around paper and first in front-page makeup for six columns and over at the 17th annual convention of the Iowa College Press Association in 1933.
- All-state college newspaper and first in front-page makeup for six columns and over at the annual convention of the Iowa College Press Association in 1936.
- Best all-around newspaper and first in front-page makeup for six columns and over at the annual convention of the Iowa College Press Association in 1937.
- All-American honors from the National Scholastic Press Association (which then became the Associated Collegiate Press) from 1937-1949.
- 5 star All-American Honor by the Associated Collegiate Press for spring 1982 issues
