= Charles W. Steger =

American architect and engineer

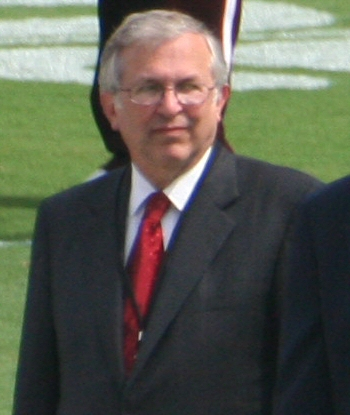
- Steger in 2007

15th President of Virginia Polytechnic Institute and State University
- In office January 7, 2000 – May 31, 2014
- Preceded by: Paul E. Torgersen
- Succeeded by: Timothy D. Sands

Personal details
- Born: Charles William Steger Jr. June 16, 1947 Richmond, Virginia, U.S.
- Died: May 6, 2018 (aged 70) Blacksburg, Virginia, U.S.
- Education: Virginia Tech (BA, PhD)

Charles William Steger Jr. (June 16, 1947 – May 6, 2018) was an American architect and engineer who was the 15th president of Virginia Polytechnic Institute and State University (Virginia Tech) in Blacksburg, Virginia, United States. He graduated in 1969 from Virginia Tech, where he also received his master's in architecture and Ph.D. in Environmental Science and Engineering.

Steger served at Virginia Tech at nearly every level possible. He was a Virginia Tech student, instructor (where he won two teaching excellence awards and co-authored a textbook now in its seventh edition), academic department head, college dean (the youngest dean of any college of architecture in the US), vice president, and finally president.

In Steger's previous position as Vice President for Development and University Relations, he served as director of a six-year campaign which exceeded its $250 million goal raising $337.4 million with over 71,000 donors.

On May 14, 2013, Steger announced that he would step down as the President of Virginia Tech. He was succeeded on June 1, 2014, by Timothy D. Sands, Executive Vice President for Academic Affairs and Provost at Purdue University. Steger died on May 6, 2018, in his home in Blacksburg.

== Accomplishments as president ==
Steger's early years as president focused on expanding Virginia Tech's continuing education and outreach programs beyond the main Blacksburg campus. Under his administration, Virginia Tech created the Center for European Studies and Architecture in Switzerland and the Washington-Alexandria Center for Architecture near Washington, D.C. Steger was also instrumental in the creation of Virginia Tech's Public Service Office in downtown Richmond. Most recently, Steger's administration was instrumental in the establishment of the Virginia Bioinformatics Institute which will focus on research efforts to end disease, expand the world's food supply, and environmental protection. In an effort to draw many research and outreach activities together, Steger's administration also created the Virginia Tech Institute for Information Technology.

== Awards and appointments ==
Steger was appointed to the Governor's Commission on Population Growth and Development. He also served on the Board of Trustees of Hollins University. In addition to his duties as Virginia Tech president, he also served as president of the Endowment Foundation Center in the Square in Roanoke, Virginia. Steger also was a director on the Boswil Foundation in Zürich, Switzerland. The Swiss Ambassador to the United States and the World Bank asked Steger to serve on a committee to establish a foundation in the United States to conduct research on mitigating global natural disasters.

Steger was inducted into the College of Fellows of the American Institute of Architects (AIA) in 1990, and received the Distinguished Achievement Award of the Virginia Society of AIA in 1996. He received the Outstanding Fund Raising Executive Award given by the First Virginia Chapter of the National Society of Fund Raising Executives at its 1999 National Philanthropy Day Awards Dinner.

== Virginia Tech shooting ==
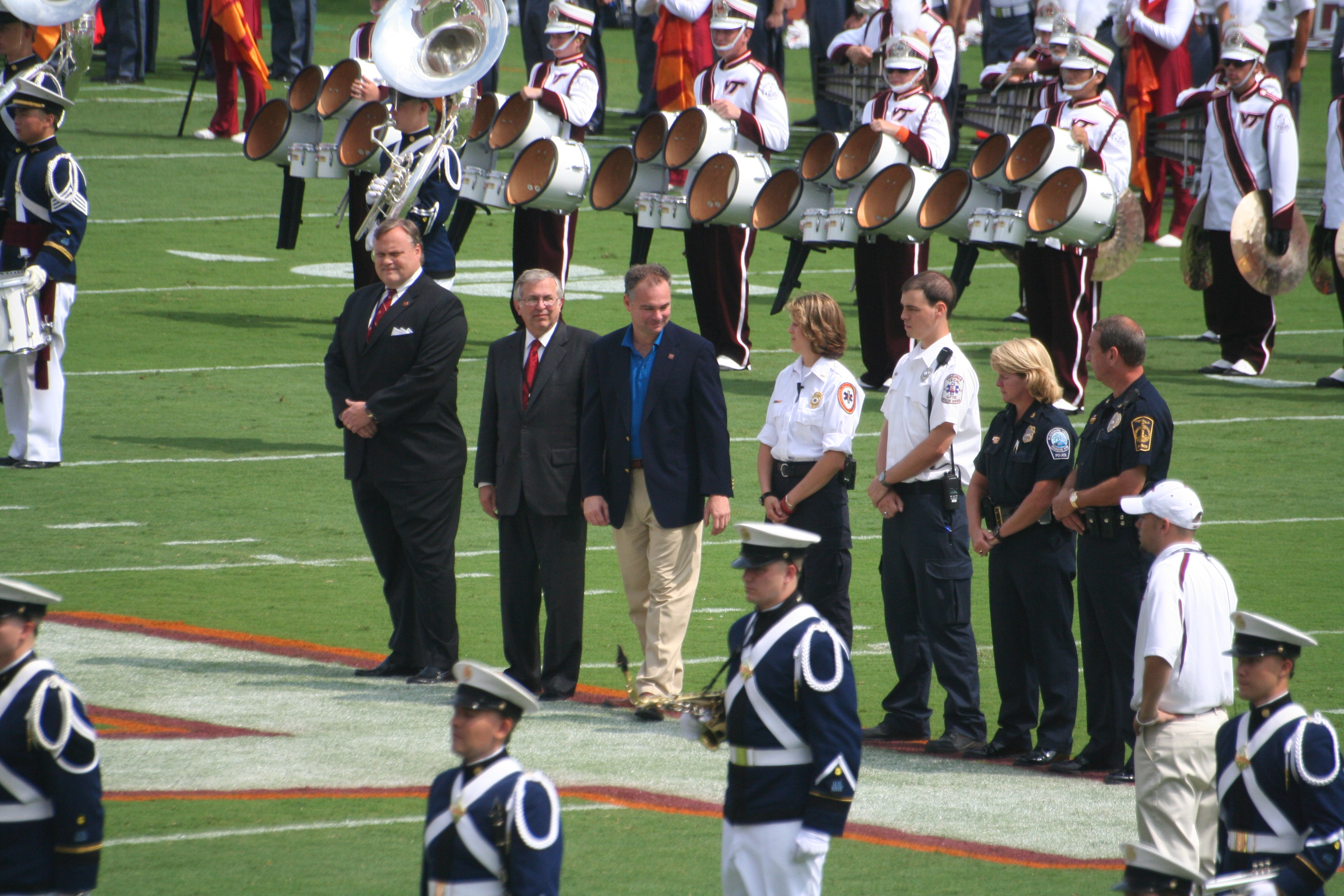
Steger (center left), along with Governor Tim Kaine, thanks the Virginia Tech first responders at the 2007 football season opener

Steger was President during the Virginia Tech shootings of April 16, 2007, in which 32 people were killed and another 17 were injured by Seung-Hui Cho in two buildings on opposite sides of the sprawling campus. Cho's killings became the deadliest single-perpetrator civilian shooting in U.S. history. Steger called the shootings "a tragedy of monumental proportions." In the report produced by a state appointed commission to review response by university, local, state, and federal agencies to the unfolding incident focused its criticism on the mental health system which failed Cho but also noted that "senior university administrators, acting as the emergency Policy Group, failed to issue an all-campus notification about the first two killings in a dormitory until almost two hours had elapsed. University practice may have conflicted with written policies."

Nearly two-and-a-half hours after the first two killings, after leaving the Virginia Tech campus and walking to the Blacksburg Post Office to mail his manifesto to MSNBC, Cho chained the doors of Norris Hall and opened fire. He took the lives of 30 more students and faculty members before killing himself as police stormed the building.

Steger, along with several other Virginia Tech officials, was personally named a defendant in lawsuits filed against the Commonwealth of Virginia by the families of two of the deceased victims of the Virginia Tech massacre, though Steger was later dismissed from the case. In 2012 Jurors in Montgomery County Circuit Court ruled that the state was negligent in the deaths of Julia Pryde and Erin Peterson. The jury panel awarded the parents of Pryde and Peterson $4 million each. The court later reduced the amount to $100,000 per family.

This judgement was overturned on appeal in a unanimous verdict by the Virginia Supreme Court on October 31, 2013. The justices wrote that “there was no duty for the Commonwealth to warn students about the potential for criminal acts by third parties. Therefore we will reverse the judgement of the circuit court.”
