= W. Robert Parks =

American university administrator

William Robert Parks
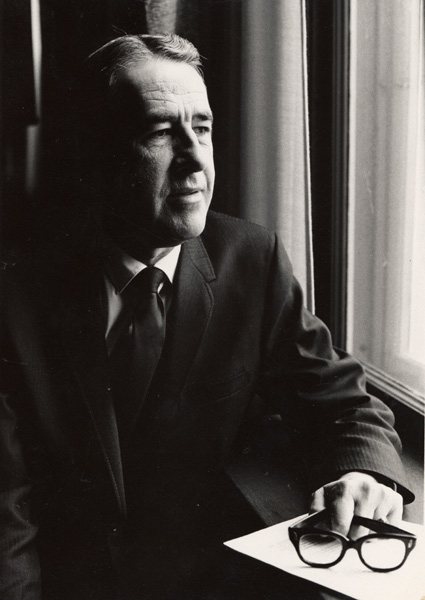

11th President of Iowa State University
- In office 1965–1986
- Preceded by: James H. Hilton
- Succeeded by: Gordon P. Eaton

Personal details
- Born: October 13, 1915
- Died: July 13, 2003 (aged 87)
- Education: Berea College; University of Kentucky; University of Wisconsin–Madison

William Robert Parks (October 13, 1915 – July 13, 2003) was the 11th president of Iowa State University, and the first social scientist to become president of the university.

== Biography ==
Parks studied for his BA in political science at Berea College, Kentucky, graduating in 1937. He went on to earn an MA in political science from the University of Kentucky in 1938, and a PhD from the University of Wisconsin–Madison in 1945.

He worked in research and administration with the U.S. Bureau of Agricultural Economics from 1940 to 1948, and became a Lieutenant of the United States Navy during World War II. He was Professor of Government at Iowa State University from 1948 to 1956, and then Professor of Agricultural Economics at the University of Wisconsin–Madison from 1956 to 1958.

He was Dean of Instruction at ISU from 1958 - 1961, and was named Vice President of Academic Affairs (1961 - 1965). He became the 11th president of ISU in 1965, serving in that post until 1986.

During his career, Parks was Head of the National Association of State Universities and Land Grant Colleges, Head of the Association of American Universities, Head of the Council of Presidents, Head of the Mid-American State Universities Association, and Head of the Association of Iowa College Presidents. He was a member of the board of trustees of the Teachers Insurance and Annuities-College Retirement Equities Fund, and was on the board of directors of Norwestern Bell and Central Life Assurance. He received honorary doctorates from Bear College (1966), Westmar College (1968), Drake University (1968), and University of Kentucky (1973). He was named honorary alumnus of ISU in 1969. The ISU university library was named the W. Robert and Ellen Sorge Parks Library in 1984. Parks received the first Christian Petersen Design Award for his leadership in establishing ISU's College of Design.

== Personal life ==
Parks married Ellen Sorge (1914–1999) and had two daughters: Andrea (Van Howeling) and Cynthia (Hamilton). Ellen was the first woman to receive a PhD in political science from the University of Wisconsin–Madison.

Academic offices
Preceded by James H. Hilton	President of Iowa State University; 1965-1986	Succeeded by Gordon P. Eaton
