= France A. Córdova =

American astrophysicist and university president

France Córdova
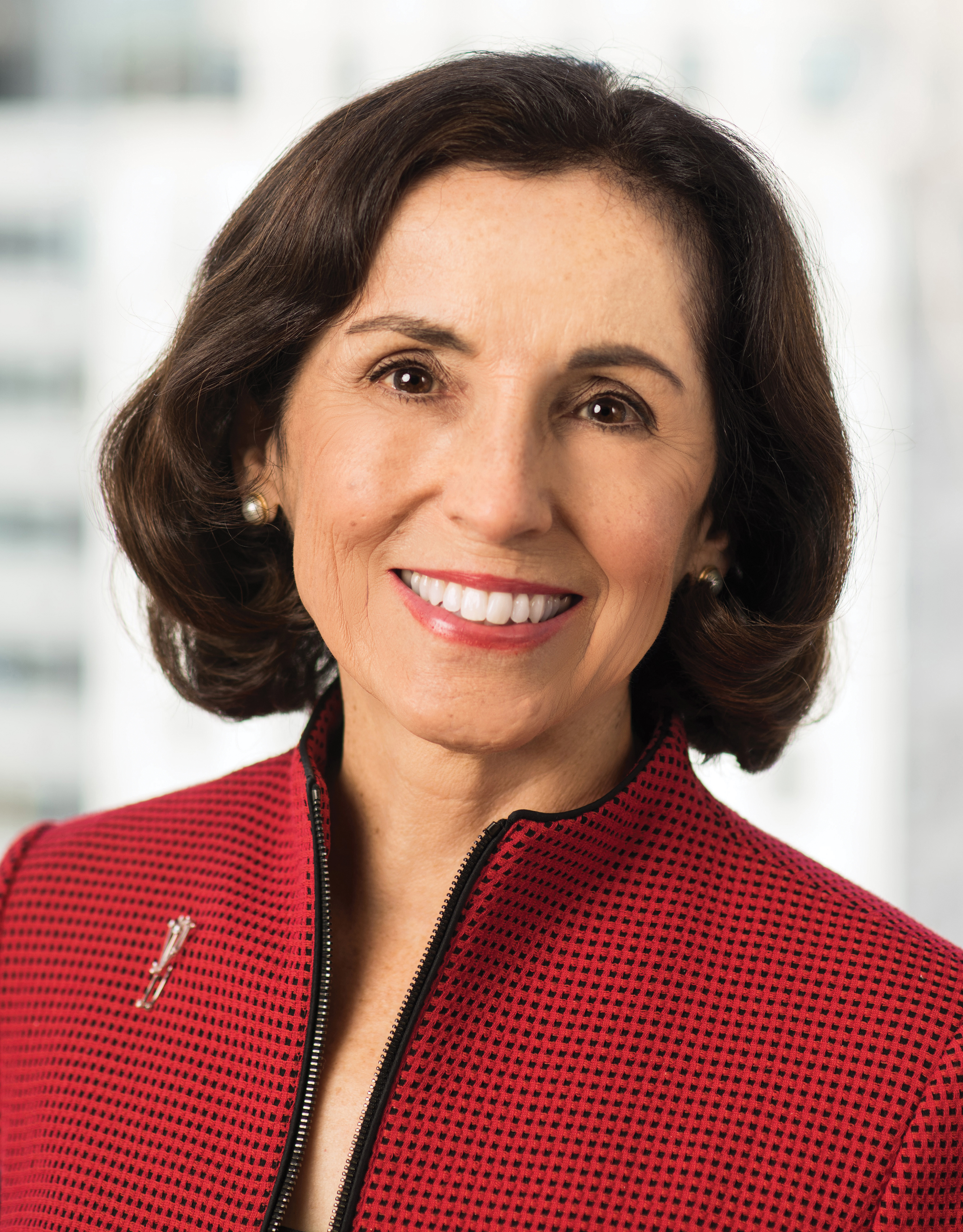
- Córdova in 2017

14th Director of the National Science Foundation
- In office March 31, 2014 – March 31, 2020
- President: Barack Obama; Donald Trump
- Preceded by: Subra Suresh
- Succeeded by: Kelvin Droegemeier (acting); Sethuraman Panchanathan

11th President of the Purdue University System
- In office July 16, 2007 – June 30, 2012
- Preceded by: Martin C. Jischke
- Succeeded by: Timothy Sands (acting); Mitch Daniels

7th Chancellor of the University of California, Riverside
- In office July 1, 2002 – July 1, 2007
- Preceded by: Raymond L. Orbach
- Succeeded by: Timothy P. White

Personal details
- Born: August 5, 1947 (age 79) Paris, France
- Spouse: Christian Foster
- Children: 2
- Education: Stanford University (BA); California Institute of Technology (PhD)
- Scientific career
- Workplaces: National Science Foundation; Purdue University; University of California, Riverside; University of California, Santa Barbara; NASA; Pennsylvania State University; Los Alamos National Laboratory
- Thesis: X-ray observations of dwarf novae (1979)
- Doctoral advisor: Gordon Garmire

France Anne-Dominic Córdova (born August 5, 1947) is an American astrophysicist. She served as the 11th president of Purdue University from 2007 to 2012 and as the 14th director of the National Science Foundation from 2014 to 2020. She currently serves as the president of the Science Philanthropy Alliance.

== Early years ==
Córdova was born in Paris, France, the eldest of twelve children. Her mother was Irish-American and her father was a Mexican-American West Point graduate and businessman. She attended high school at Bishop Amat High School in La Puente, California, east of Los Angeles and went on to Stanford University, where she graduated cum laude with a bachelor's degree in English and conducted anthropological field work in a Zapotec Indian pueblo in Oaxaca, Mexico. After viewing a PBS program about neutron stars, Córdova’s fascination with astrophysics gained momentum. She earned a PhD in Physics from the California Institute of Technology in 1979.

== Career ==
Córdova worked at the Space Astronomy and Astrophysics Group at the Los Alamos National Laboratory from 1979 to 1989, where she also served as Deputy Group Leader. She headed the Department of Astronomy and Astrophysics at Pennsylvania State University from 1989 to 1993. In 1993, NASA Administrator Daniel Goldin appointed Córdova NASA Chief Scientist, the first woman to serve in the role. Within her role as Chief Scientist, Córdova connected the gap between NASA and the goals of the larger scientific community, especially through the International Space Station

Córdova then went to the University of California, Santa Barbara where she was Vice-Chancellor for Research and a Professor of Physics. In 2002 she was appointed Chancellor of the University of California, Riverside by UC President Richard C. Atkinson, where she was also a Distinguished Professor of Physics and Astronomy. Córdova led the initial steps toward establishing the UC Riverside School of Medicine.

Córdova became the eleventh president of Purdue University in 2007 and promoted student success and the commercialization of interdisciplinary research. She is the first and only woman to serve in this role. Her administration oversaw the establishment of Purdue's College of Health and Human Sciences and its Global Policy Research Institute. At the end of her term, Purdue's trustees credited her with leading the school to record levels of research funding, reputational rankings, and student retention rates.

Córdova's scientific career contributions have been in the areas of observational and experimental astrophysics, multi-spectral research on x-ray and gamma ray sources, and space-borne instrumentation. She has published more than 150 scientific papers and numerous science policy papers. In September 2007, she was appointed to the board of directors of BioCrossroads, Indiana's initiative to grow the life sciences through a public-private collaboration that supports the region's research and corporate strengths while encouraging new business development.

Córdova was appointed by President George W. Bush to the National Science Board in 2008. President Barack Obama appointed Córdova to the Board of Regents of the Smithsonian Institution in 2009, and she served until 2014. She was chair of the Board of Regents from 2012 to 2014.

In 2014, Córdova was nominated by Obama and confirmed by the United States Senate as the 14th head of the National Science Foundation.

At the conclusion of her term at NSF in 2020, Córdova was elected to the Caltech Board of Trustees and named as an External Science Advisor to the Science Philanthropy Alliance. In May 2021, she was named President of the Science Philanthropy Alliance.

== Personal life ==
Córdova is married to science educator Christian J. Foster, with whom she has two children, Anne-Catherine and Stephen. One of her hobbies is rock climbing, a hobby where she met her husband. In a Physics Today article she talks about how she turned down an offer from her advisor to be nominated as an astronaut, preferring instead to focus on research. In an interview with the American Institute of Physics, she describes her career decisions and life path in greater detail. She said that being a physicist influenced her leadership style, that she is optimistic about the future and that one never knows when they will use the knowledge they learn.

== Honors and awards ==
In 1996, she received NASA's highest honor, the NASA Distinguished Service Medal. She was recognized as a 2000 Kilby Laureate, for "contributions to society through science, technology, innovation, invention, and education." She was named one of the 80 Elite Hispanic Women by Hispanic Business Magazine in 2002. In 2008, Córdova was nominated to the Stanford University Multicultural Alumni Hall of Fame by El Centro Chicano, Stanford's Chicano and Latino organization. In 2012, she received the Women in Space Science Award from the Adler Planetarium.

Purdue University's France A. Córdova Recreational Sports Center was named for her in 2012. A 98-million-dollar renovation of the 55-year-old facility was approved during her presidency. The building was one of 10 recreation facilities to receive a Facility of Merit Award for 2014 from Athletic Business.

Córdova was inducted into the California Hall of Fame in 2019. Research!America awarded Córdova the Geoffrey Beene Foundation Builders of Science Award in 2022. In 2025, Córdova was included in Forbes' 50 Over 50 list. In 2025, the American Institute of Physics Foundation created the France A. Córdova Endowed Forum on Science Policy & Society.

Córdova is a fellow of the American Association for the Advancement of Science (AAAS), the Association for Women in Science (AWIS), and the American Academy of Arts and Sciences, and is an elected member of the National Academy of Sciences and the American Philosophical Society. She is an honorary member of the Royal Irish Academy.

Córdova has received multiple honorary doctorates, including from (chronologically):

- Loyola Marymount University in Los Angeles (1997)
- Ben-Gurion University of the Negev in Israel (2011)
- Purdue University, Doctor of Science (2012)
- Duke University (2015)
- Saint Peter's University (2016)
- University of Connecticut, Doctor of Science (2016)
- Rochester Institute of Technology (2016)
- Worcestor Polytechnic Institute (2016)
- Dartmouth College (2019)
- Carnegie Mellon University (2021)
- Clarkson University (2022)
- Yale University, Doctor of Science (2023)
- University of Michigan, Doctor of Science (2025)

Academic offices
Preceded by Raymond L. Orbach	7th Chancellor of the University of California, Riverside; 2002–2007	Succeeded by Timothy P. White
Preceded by Martin C. Jischke	11th President of the Purdue University System; 2007–2012	Succeeded by Timothy Sands; Acting
Government offices
Preceded by Subra Suresh	14th Director of the National Science Foundation; 2014–2020	Succeeded by Kelvin Droegemeier Acting; Sethuraman Panchanathan
