= William Ruud =

American academic (born 1952)

19th President of Marietta College
- In office July 3, 2016 – June 30, 2023
- Preceded by: Joseph W. Bruno
- Succeeded by: Margaret Drugovich

10th President of University of Northern Iowa
- In office May 31, 2013 – July 3, 2016
- Preceded by: Benjamin J. Allen
- Succeeded by: Mark Nook

15th President of Shippensburg University of Pennsylvania
- In office 2007–2013
- Preceded by: Anthony Ceddia
- Succeeded by: George F. Harpster

Personal details
- Born: William Nelson Ruud; September 29, 1952 (age 73) North Dakota, U.S.
- Spouse: Judith Ruud
- Education: University of North Dakota (BS); University of Nebraska–Lincoln (MS, PhD)

Military service
- Branch/service: United States Army
- Years of service: 1978–1981

William Nelson Ruud (born September 29, 1952) is an American academic and former university administrator. He was previously president of Marietta College, the University of Northern Iowa, and Shippensburg University of Pennsylvania.

== Early life and education ==
Ruud was born in North Dakota. He received his Bachelor of Science degree in public administration and hospital administration from the University of North Dakota. While at the University of North Dakota, Ruud was a member of Kappa Sigma fraternity. He received a Master of Business Administration and doctorate in organizational behavior from the University of Nebraska–Lincoln.

== Career ==
Ruud served in the United States Army from 1978 to 1981. He began teaching at the University of Toledo in 1981 and went on to become dean of the College of Business and Economics at Boise State University in 1993, and later the vice president for institutional advancement. Beginning in 2004, Ruud next served as professor of management, policy, and strategy at California State University, Stanislaus and served two years as vice president for development and university relations. In February 2007, he became president of Shippensburg University of Pennsylvania. On February 7, 2013, it was announced Ruud would be the 10th president of the University of Northern Iowa. He assumed the position on May 31, 2013. Ruud was formally installed as president in a ceremony on October 4, 2013, in the Gallagher-Bluedorn Performing Arts Center.

On May 18, 2016, it was announced that Ruud would leave the University of Northern Iowa to become president of Marietta College, effective July 3.

On February 20, 2023, Ruud announced his departure from Marietta College, effective on or before June 30, 2023.
