= University of Northern Iowa =

Public university in Cedar Falls, Iowa, US

- Former names: Iowa State Normal School (1876–1909); Iowa State Teachers College (1909–1961); State College of Iowa (1961–1967)
- Motto: Lux (Latin)
- Motto in English: Light
- Type: Public university
- Established: September 6, 1876; 150 years ago
- Parent institution: Iowa Board of Regents
- Accreditation: HLC
- Academic affiliations: Space-grant
- Endowment: $231.6 million (2025)
- President: Mark Nook
- Provost: Jose Herrerra
- Students: 9,283 (fall 2024)
- Undergraduates: 7,716 (fall 2024)
- Postgraduates: 1,567 (fall 2024)
- Location: Cedar Falls, Iowa, United States; 42°30′54″N 92°27′38″W
- Campus: 900 acres (360 ha); Small city
- Newspaper: The Northern Iowan
- Colors: Purple and gold
- Nickname: Panthers
- Sporting affiliations: NCAA Division I FCS – MVC; MVFC; Big 12
- Mascots: TC Panther (male) & TK Panther (female)
- Website: www.uni.edu

The University of Northern Iowa (UNI) is a public university in Cedar Falls, Iowa, United States. The fall 2025 total enrollment was 9,204 students. UNI is a comprehensive university and one of three public universities in Iowa, all of which are governed by the Iowa Board of Regents.

The university was initially founded in 1876 as the Iowa State Normal School with the purpose of training school teachers and educators.The university offers approximately 160 majors and minors divided between five colleges, those being the Wilson College of Business, College of Education, College of Humanities, Arts & Sciences (CHAS), College of Social and Behavioral Sciences (CSBS), and the College of Graduate, Research, and Online Education (GROE).

== History ==
The University of Northern Iowa was founded as a result of two influential forces of the nineteenth century. First, Iowa wanted to care for orphans of its Civil War troops, and later, Iowa needed a public teacher training institution. The prelusive orphanage first opened as the Iowa Soldiers' Orphans Home. The efforts to establish an orphanage were first promoted by Annie Turner Wittenmyer of Muscatine. She lobbied the Iowa General Assembly to establish homes in Cedar Falls and Davenport. In 1876, when Iowa no longer needed an orphan home, Black Hawk County legislators Edward G. Miller and H. C. Hemenway introduced legislation to transform the orphanage campus into the Iowa State Normal School. By thin margins, one vote in the Senate and two votes in the House, the bill passed and Governor Kirkwood signed into law the measure "for the special instruction and training for teachers of the common schools of the state."

The school's first building opened in 1867 and was known as Central Hall. The building contained classrooms, common areas, and a living facility for most of the students. It was also a home to the college's first principal, James Cleland Gilchrist. The building was the heart and soul of the school, allowing students to study courses of two-year, three-year, and four-year degrees. In 1965, a fire destroyed Central Hall, and school faculty and Cedar Falls citizens donated over $5,000 to start building Gilchrist Hall.

The school has been known under the following names:

- Iowa State Normal School, 1876–1909
- Iowa State Teachers College, 1909–1961
- State College of Iowa, 1961–1967
- University of Northern Iowa, 1967–present

From 2014 through 2018 the UNI hosted the Midwest Summer Institute: Inclusion and Communication for All, a two-day conference on facilitated communication sponsored by the Inclusion Connection and Syracuse University's Institute on Communication and Inclusion. Facilitated communication is a discredited practice, and in 2018 UNI decided to discontinue the conference at the urging of multiple nationwide academics.

=== Presidents ===
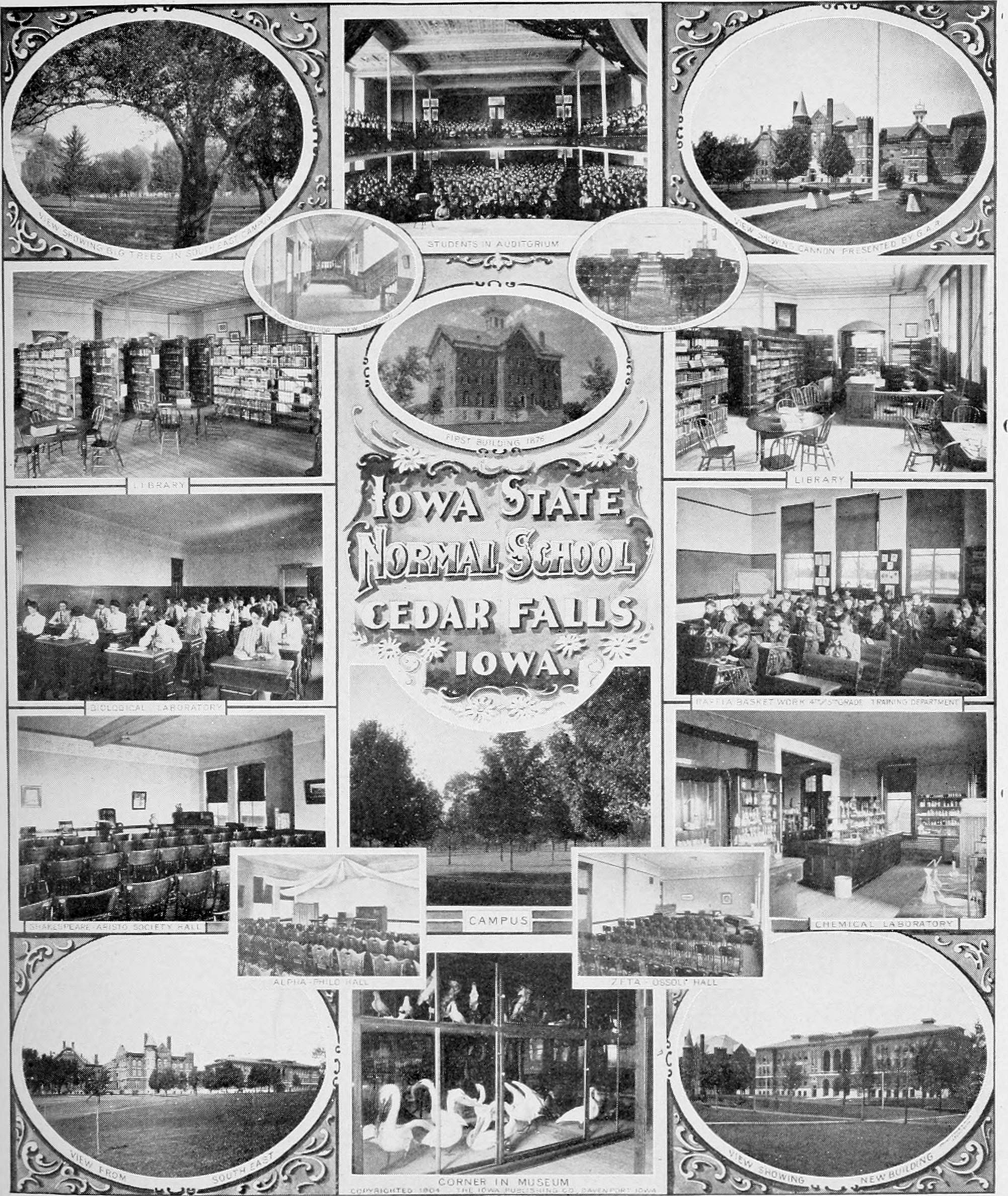
Iowa State Normal School, c. 1904

Since its founding, the university has had eleven presidents.

- James Cleland Gilchrist, 1876–1886
- Homer Horatio Seerley, 1886–1928
- Orval Ray Latham, 1928–1940
- Malcolm Poyer Price, 1940–1950
- James William Maucker, 1950–1970
- John Joseph Kamerick, 1970–1983
- Constantine William Curris, 1983–1995
- Robert D. Koob, 1995–2006
- Benjamin J. Allen, 2006–2013
- William Ruud, 2013–2016
- Mark Nook, 2017–present

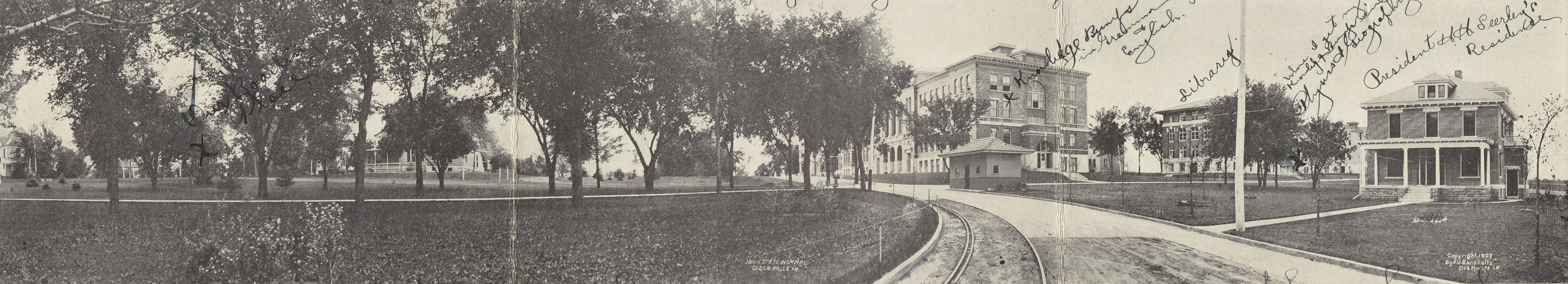
Lang Hall, 1907

== Academics ==
Undergraduate demographics as of Fall 2023
Race and ethnicity	Total
White	84%
Hispanic	6%
Black	3%
Two or more races	3%
Asian	2%
International student	1%
Unknown	1%
Economic diversity
Low-income (Note: The percentage of students who received an income-based federal Pell grant intended for low-income students.)	25%
Affluent (Note: The percentage of students who are a part of the American middle class at the bare minimum.)	75%

University of Northern Iowa colleges include:

- Wilson College of Business
- Education
- Humanities, Arts and Sciences
- Social and Behavioral Sciences
- Graduate College

=== Study Abroad Center ===
UNI provides an opportunity for the students to study in 25+ countries and select from over 40 programs. It is also available to all students attending the university. The mission of the Study Abroad Center at the University of Northern Iowa is to provide service and leadership in international education to UNI students, faculty, staff, the community and the State of Iowa.

=== Culture and Intensive English Program ===
The Culture and Intensive English Program (CIEP) is an intensive program in English for non-native speakers. It is designed to prepare students for academic work at the undergraduate or graduate degree level. University of Northern Iowa students are also encouraged to participate in the Conversation Partner Program to help foreign students with their English ability and foster cross-cultural relationships while gaining mutual understanding.

=== North American Review ===
The university is the publisher of The North American Review (called the NAR), a celebrated literary magazine that began originally in Boston in 1815. Its past editors have included James Russell Lowell, Charles Eliot Norton, and Henry Adams; while among its past contributors are Mark Twain, Henry James, Joseph Conrad, Walt Whitman, Kurt Vonnegut, Joyce Carol Oates, Guy Davenport and Margaret Atwood. In 1968, when the magazine was purchased by UNI, Robley Wilson was appointed editor, a position he continued in until his retirement in 2000. The current editors are Rachel Morgan, Jeremy Schraffenberger, Grant Tracey, and Brooke Wonders.

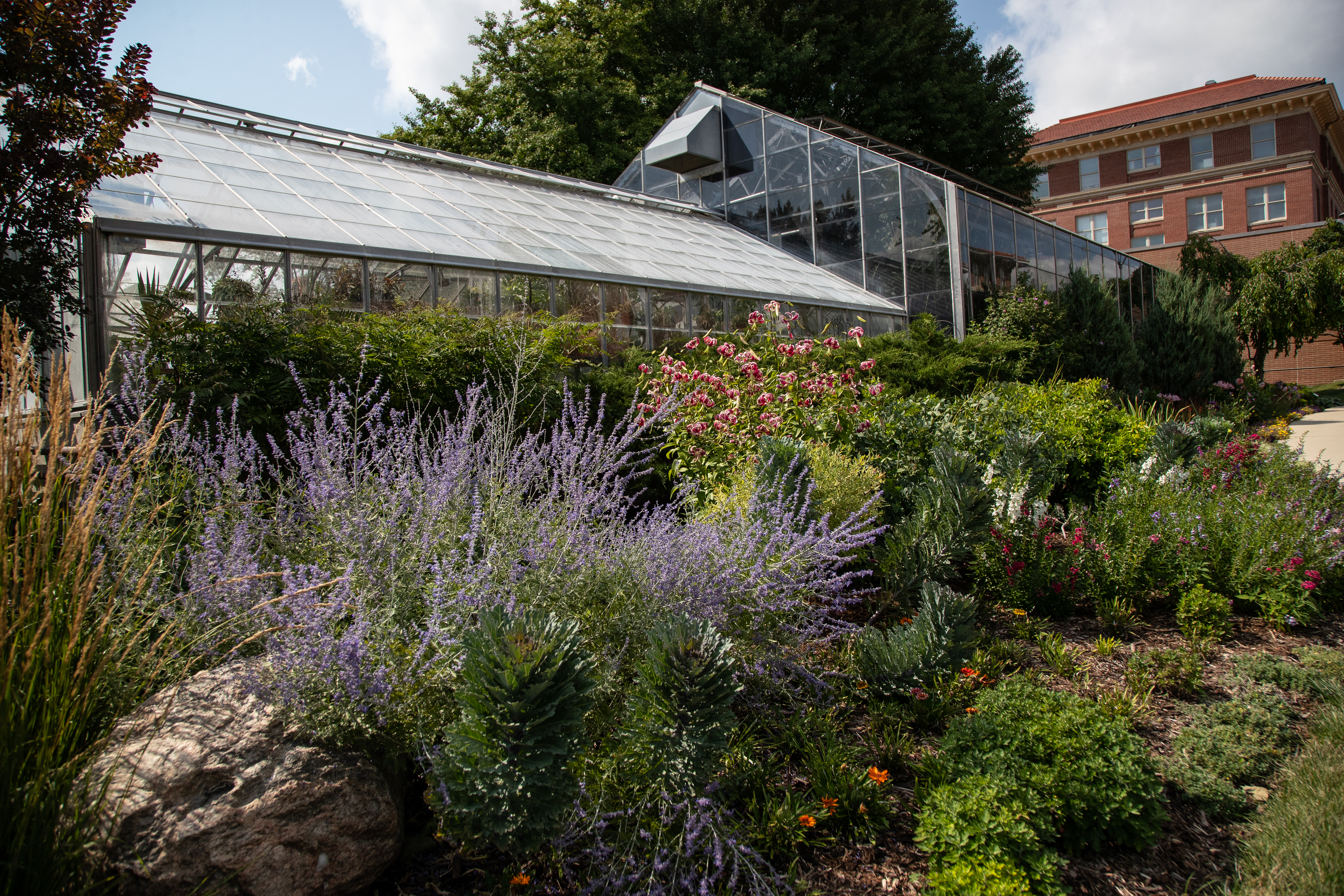
UNI Teaching and Research Greenhouse

=== Teaching and Research Greenhouse ===
The University of Northern Iowa Teaching and Research Greenhouse is a greenhouse complex incorporating botanical gardens for research and education. It is located on the campus of the University of Northern Iowa in Cedar Falls, Iowa.

The greenhouse contains plants from many ecotypes, including 250 tropical plants, two live birds, an extensive collection of arid climate plants, and the 1,200-square-foot (110 m^{2}) Aquatic Learning Center.

=== International collaboration ===
The university is an active member of the University of the Arctic. UArctic is an international cooperative network based in the Circumpolar Arctic region, consisting of more than 200 universities, colleges, and other organizations with an interest in promoting education and research in the Arctic region.

== Athletics ==
The school's mascot is the Panther, represented as a sibling pair of mascots known as TC (The Cat) and his sister TK. They participate in the NCAA's Division I, in the Missouri Valley Conference (MVC) for most sports, the Big 12 Conference for wrestling, and the Missouri Valley Football Conference – in Division I's Football Championship Subdivision (FCS) – for football.

The major arena on campus is the UNI-Dome, currently the home of the football team. The Dome also serves as a venue for many local concerts, high school football playoffs, trade shows, and other events. In 2006, the university opened a new arena, the McLeod Center, to serve as the home for several athletic programs that had previously played in the UNI-Dome, including the volleyball and men's and women's basketball teams.

The UNI athletics program has enjoyed recent success, with the men's basketball team competing in the NCAA tournament three consecutive times in 2004, 2005, 2006, again in 2009 and 2010 and in 2015 and 2016. On March 20, 2010, the men's basketball team defeated the heavily favored, top-seeded Kansas Jayhawks to advance to the NCAA Sweet Sixteen. It was the school's first appearance in the Sweet Sixteen. The Jayhawks were favored to win the NCAA championship. Their Cinderella potential ended with a loss to Michigan State in the Sweet Sixteen, 59–52. The win over Kansas earned them the 2010 ESPY Award for Best Upset.

Jacqui Kalin helped lead the women's basketball team to consecutive NCAA Tournament berths, as the team won back-to-back MVC Tournament titles. In 2010-11 she was named the Jackie Stiles MVC Player of the Year. In 2012-13 she led the league in scoring (19.5 ppg; a school record), had the fourth-highest season free throw percentage in NCAA Division 1 history-and the highest of any senior (95.5%), and was again named the Jackie Stiles MVC Player of the Year. For her career Kalin was first all-time at UNI in scoring (2,081), 3-point field goals made (265), free throws made (484), and free throw percentage (.920) the NCAA Division 1 career record.

The football team has been ranked in the I-AA (FCS) top 25 almost every year for the last two decades. The team appeared in the I-AA championship game in 2005, only to lose a close game to the Appalachian State Mountaineers. During 2007, the team was ranked #1 in the country by the TSN FCS poll for several weeks. The football team went undefeated in 2007 with an 11–0 record, a first for any school in the 23-year history of the Gateway conference. In 2001 and 2002 the volleyball team reached the NCAA Sweet 16 round, and in 2006 made it to the second round, and has competed in the tournament numerous times. The track team is also very successful (usually ranked in the top 25), as are the wrestling and volleyball teams.

The University of Northern Iowa wrestling team won the NCAA Division I national championship as ISTC in 1949 and NCAA Division II national championships in 1975 and 1978. They competed in the Western Wrestling Conference until 2012, when UNI became an associate member of the Mid-American Conference since the MVC is a non-wrestling conference. In 2017, UNI wrestling joined the Big 12 Conference. In 1977 the women's softball team won the AIAW national championship.

Bryce Paup won the Defensive Player of Year Award by the Associated Press in 1995. In 1999 and 2001, UNI alumnus Kurt Warner was named NFL MVP by the AP.

During the 2014–2015 season, the men's basketball team ended the regular season ranked #11 by the AP Poll, the highest ranking in school history, and #9 by USA Today.

== Student life ==
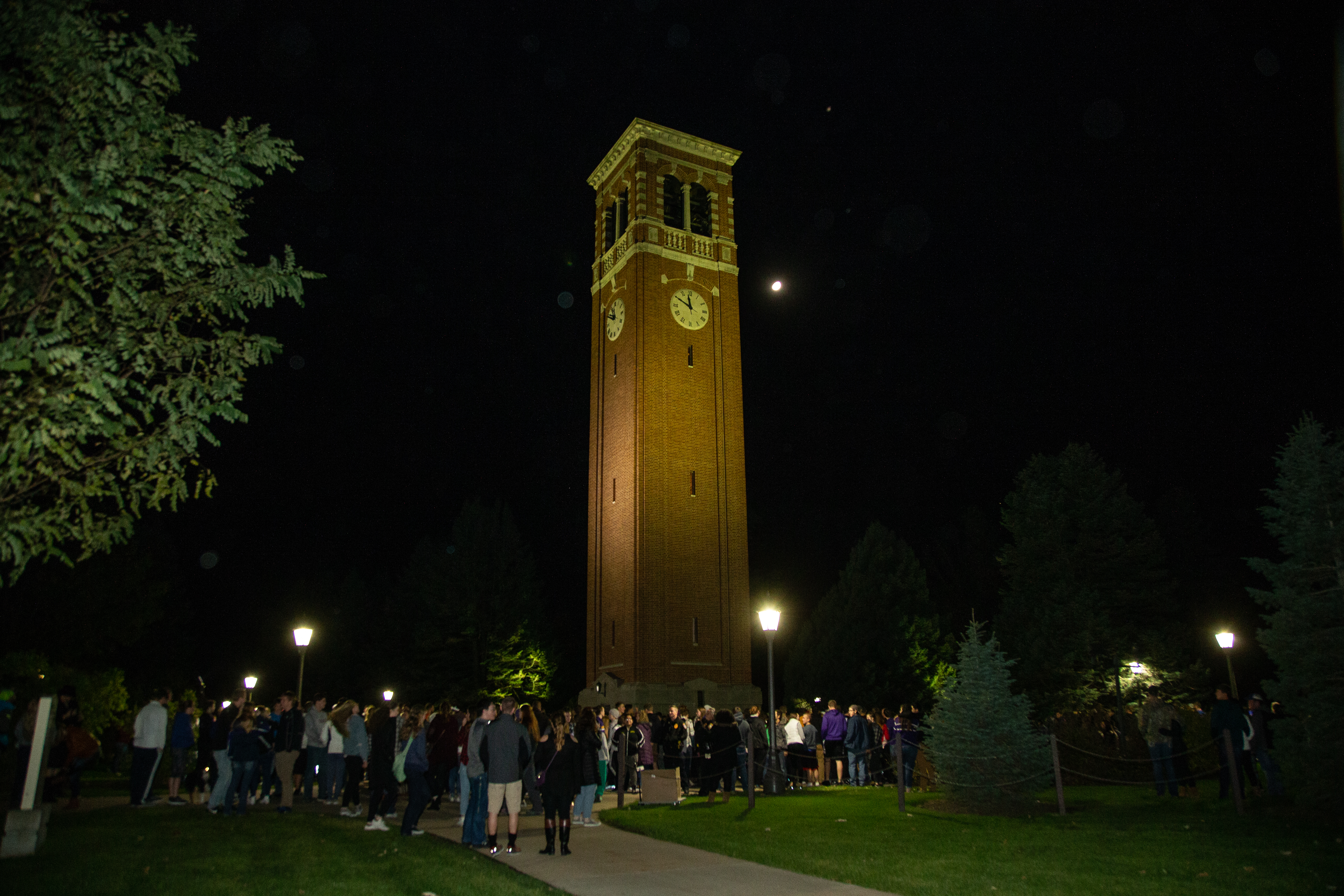
Campanile 2018

=== Student newspapers ===
- Students Offering, 1888–1889
- Normal Eye, 1892–1911
- College Eye, 1911–1967
- Northern Iowan, 1967–present

=== Fraternity and sorority life ===
==== Fraternities ====
- Kappa Sigma

==== NPC sororities ====
- Alpha Delta Pi
- Alpha Xi Delta
- Alpha Phi
- Gamma Phi Beta
- Alpha Sigma Tau

==== Culturally Based Greek Chapters ====
- Delta Sigma Theta

=== Transportation ===
UNI students may ride public transportation provided by the Metropolitan Transit Authority of Black Hawk County for $0.75 a ride with a student ID. Routes 6, 7, 9, and 10 connect campus to downtown Cedar Falls, downtown Waterloo and various other destinations.

== Notable people ==
=== Alumni ===
- William R. Clabby, journalist and editor
- Brittni Donaldson, professional basketball coach
- Jane Elliott, antiracist and diversity educator
- David Glawe, former Under Secretary of Homeland Security for Intelligence and Analysis
- Chuck Grassley (born 1933), senior United States senator from Iowa and president pro tempore of the United States Senate
- Carolyn Hunt, First Lady of North Carolina
- David Johnson, professional football player
- Jacqui Kalin (born 1989), American-Israeli professional basketball player
- Eric Keller, college wrestling coach
- Chris Klieman, college football coach
- Jason Lewis, politician and radio host
- Brian Meyer, member of the Iowa House of Representatives
- Jeremy Morgan (born 1995), professional basketball player
- Patrick Murphy, University of Alabama head softball coach
- Carter F. Nordman, member of the Iowa House of Representatives from the 19th district
- Nick Nurse, professional basketball coach
- Bryce Paup, professional football player
- Duane Slick, fine art painter and professor
- William Smith, Olympic gold medalist in wrestling
- Edward Arthur Thomas, high school football coach
- Kurt Warner, professional football player

=== Faculty ===
- Donna Alvermann, professor
- Jeremy Beck, composer and professor
- Harry Brod, former professor
- Herb Hake, television personality
- James Hearst, poet and former professor
- Bonnie Litwiller, mathematics educator
- Miguel Franz Pinto, vocal coach, conductor, and pianist
- Mildred Hope Fisher Wood, special education teacher
- Loree Rackstraw, literary critic and memoirist
- Leland Sage, former professor
- Norm Stewart, college basketball coach
- Robert James Waller, professor, academic administrator, and author
- Norma Wendelburg, composer
