= Henry William Menard =

American geologist (1920–1986)

H. William Menard
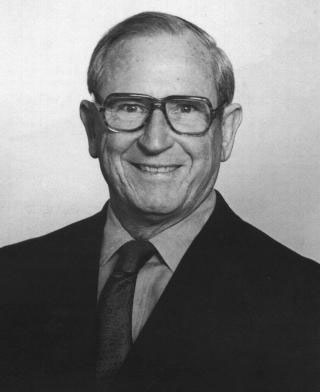
- Menard as Director of USGS, 1978–1981

10th Director of the United States Geological Survey
- In office 1978 – 1981
- Preceded by: Vincent Ellis McKelvey
- Succeeded by: Dallas Lynn Peck

Personal details
- Born: December 10, 1920 Fresno, California, US
- Died: February 9, 1986 (aged 65) La Jolla, California, US
- Scientific career
- Education: California Institute of Technology and Harvard University
- Awards: William Bowie Medal
- Fields: Marine Geology
- Workplaces: Scripps Institution of Oceanography; US Geological Survey
- Thesis: Transportation of bed-load by running water (1949)
- Doctoral advisor: Henry Stetson
- Doctoral students: Marcia McNutt

Henry William Menard (December 10, 1920 – February 9, 1986) was an American geologist.

== Life and career ==
He earned a B.S. and M.S. from the California Institute of Technology in 1942 and 1947, having served in the South Pacific during World War II as a photo interpreter. In 1949, he completed a Ph.D. in marine geology at Harvard University. Menard is perhaps best known for his promotion of the theory of plate tectonics before it was widely accepted in the scientific community. Menard served many roles during his career as a marine geologist. Field worker, theorist, educator, popularizer, entrepreneur and statesman.

Menard's historical and sociological writings are respected by historians of science. Menard began his professional career in 1949, in the Sea Floor Studies Section of San Diego's Navy Electronics Laboratory. He joined the Scripps Institution of Oceanography (SIO) in 1955 as associate professor of geology. Menard's field work was extensive, involving 1,000 aqua-lung dives and 20 oceanographic expeditions from 1949 until 1978 when he became Director of the United States Geological Survey. His research focused on the morphology of the ocean floor. During the 1950s, Menard also started a scuba-diving business with a few colleagues that included consulting for AT&T on the laying of cable.

He became a full professor of the University of California, San Diego, in 1961. Two years were spent at Churchill College (1962 and 1970–71). Following a year in Washington, D.C. as technical advisor in the Office of Science and Technology (1965–66), Menard served as Director of the University of California's Institute of Marine Resources.

=== USGS career ===
In April 1978, H. William Menard became the United States Geological Survey's tenth director but remained only through the balance of the Carter administration. Menard had been a marine geologist with the Naval Electronics Laboratory in San Diego for several years and then had become a member of the faculty of the Scripps Institution of Oceanography. In 1965-66, he was associated with the Office of Science and Technology in the White House. A member of the National Academy of Sciences, Menard was a recognized worldwide authority in marine geology and oceanography and had discovered notable topographic and structural features of the sea floor that laid much of the foundation of the plate-tectonics revolution in geology.

After his return to the Scripps Institution of Oceanography in 1981, Menard continued to teach, write, and do research. Menard died from cancer on February 9, 1986. A biographical memoir was published by the National Academy of Sciences in 1994.

== Awards and honors ==
- 1968 - elected to the National Academy of Sciences
- 1985 - William Bowie Award from the American Geophysical Union

== Publications ==
- "Marine Geology of the Pacific", 1964
- "Anatomy of an Expedition", 1969
- "Science: Growth and Change", 1971 ISBN 0-674-79280-7
- "Geology, Resources, and Society", 1974 ISBN 0-7167-0260-6
- "Ocean Science", 1978 ISBN 0-7167-0013-1
- "Islands", 1986 ISBN 0-7167-5017-1
- "The Ocean of Truth: A Personal History of Global Tectonics", 1986 ISBN 0-691-08414-9

== See also ==
- Archipelagic apron

Government offices
| Preceded by Vincent Ellis McKelvey | Director of the United States Geological Survey; 1978–1981 | Succeeded by Dallas Lynn Peck |
