= Martin C. Jischke =

American university president (born 1941)

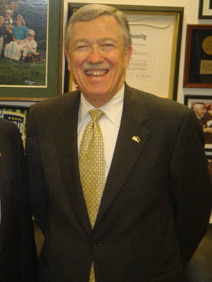
- Jischke in 2007

10th President of the Purdue University System
- In office August 14, 2000 – July 15, 2007
- Preceded by: Steven C. Beering
- Succeeded by: France A. Córdova

13th President of Iowa State University
- In office 1991–2000
- Preceded by: Gordon P. Eaton
- Succeeded by: Gregory L. Geoffroy

16th Chancellor of University of Missouri–Rolla
- In office 1986–1991
- Preceded by: Joseph M. Marchello
- Succeeded by: John T. Park

Personal details
- Born: August 7, 1941 (age 85) Chicago, Illinois, U.S.
- Education: Illinois Institute of Technology; Massachusetts Institute of Technology
- Scientific career
- Fields: Fluid dynamics
- Workplaces: University of Oklahoma; Iowa State University
- Thesis: Application of the method of parametric differentiation to radiation gasdynamics (1968)
- Doctoral advisor: Judson Baron

Martin Charles Jischke (JIS-key) (born August 7, 1941) is an American higher-education administrator and advocate who was the tenth president of Purdue University.

Jischke has served as chairman and board member of the National Association of State Universities and Land-Grant Colleges, and as a board member of the American Council on Education, National Merit Scholarship Corporation, and the Kellogg Commission on the Future of State and Land-Grant Universities. He has also served as a board member for Kerr McGee Corporation, Wabash National Corporation, and Duke Realty.

He was the founding president of the Global Consortium of Higher Education and Research for Agriculture, and is also on the boards of directors of the Association of American Universities and the American Council on Competitiveness.

== Personal background ==
Jischke was born in Chicago, the son of a grocer, and graduated from Proviso High School in Maywood, Illinois, a suburb on Chicago's west side. In 1963 he earned his bachelor's degree in physics with honors from Illinois Institute of Technology, where he currently serves on the board of trustees. While at Illinois Institute of Technology he became a member of Delta Tau Delta International Fraternity. He received his master's and doctoral degrees in aeronautics and astronautics from the Massachusetts Institute of Technology in 1968. He married his wife, Patricia "Patty" Fowler Jischke in 1970. They have two children, Charles, a photographer living in West Lafayette, Indiana and Marian, an engineer living in Indianapolis.

== Career ==
=== Science ===
Jischke, a specialist in fluid dynamics, has expertise in heat transfer, fluid mechanics, aerodynamics and high-speed aircraft and spacecraft. He is co-editor of one book and the author or co-author of 31 journal publications and 21 major technical reports. He has given more than 50 major technical presentations and lectures, and has held research fellowships with NASA and the Donald W. Douglas Laboratory. He has received research grants from the National Science Foundation, U.S. Air Force, NASA, National Institutes of Health, National Severe Storms Laboratory and the Nuclear Regulatory Commission. He served as a White House fellow and special assistant to the U.S. Secretary of Transportation from 1975 to 1976. Jischke is a fellow of the American Association for the Advancement of Science and the American Institute of Aeronautics and Astronautics. In 2006, Jischke was appointed to the President's Council on Science and Technology|Council of Advisers on Science and Technology.

=== Administration ===
Jischke was a member the faculty of the University of Oklahoma's School of Aerospace, Mechanical and Nuclear Engineering for 17 years, and also served as director of the school. During his time at the university, he was the principal advisor to 21 thesis students. He served as Chair of the Faculty Senate during the 1974–75 academic year, dean of the College of Engineering from 1981 to 1986, and in 1985 Dr. Jischke was named the university's interim president.

In 1986 Jischke was named chancellor of the University of Missouri–Rolla. Success in that role led him to the presidency of Iowa State University in 1991. He raised money for scholarships. The Martin C. Jischke Honors Building at Iowa State is named after him.

=== Awards ===
Jischke is a recipient of the American Society for Engineering Education Centennial Medallion and the Illinois Institute of Technology Professional Achievement Award. He also received the Ukraine Medal of Merit from Ukraine's president for outstanding service by a foreign national. The Illinois Institute of Technology and the National Agricultural University of Ukraine have both awarded him honorary doctoral degrees.

He is an honorary member of Mortar Board National College Senior Honor Society, having been tapped by the Barbara Cook chapter at Purdue University in 2006.

In 2013, Jischke's alma mater, Illinois Institute of Technology, awarded him with its annual Alumni Medal, the alumni association's highest honor.

== Purdue University ==
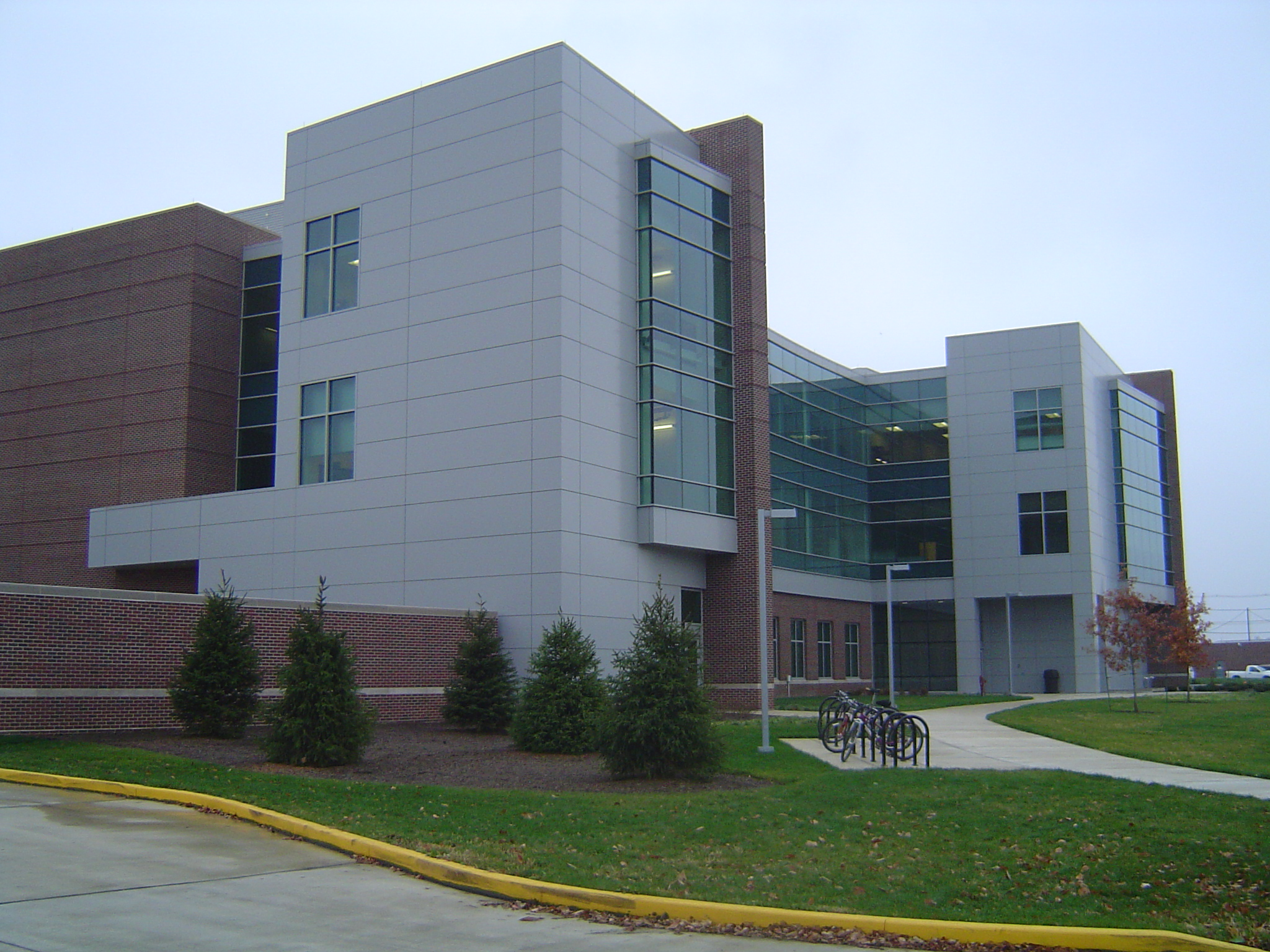
Purdue's Martin C. Jischke Hall of Biomedical Engineering opened in 2006 and was named for Jischke in 2008.

On August 14, 2000, Jischke became the tenth president of Purdue University, succeeding Steven C. Beering, who stepped down after 17 years as Purdue's president.

In October 2004, Jischke testified before the United States Senate Committee on Foreign Relations on the value of international students, their decline in U.S. university enrollment since the September 11 attacks, and recommendations for visa policy reform.

On August 4, 2006, Jischke announced he would be stepping down from the president's post at the end of the 2006–07 fiscal year. He said he would be taking a year off from public life at that time.

On May 7, 2007, the Purdue University Board of Trustees announced the appointment of France A. Córdova to succeed Jischke as the university's 11th president effective July 16, 2007.

On May 12, 2007, Jischke was awarded an honorary doctorate degree from Purdue University's College of Engineering. In June 2007, Jischke was awarded the university's first Neil Armstrong Medal of Excellence by Armstrong himself, along with the Sagamore of the Wabash, the highest honor from the governor of Indiana.

Academic offices
Preceded by Steven C. Beering	President of Purdue University; 2000–2007	Succeeded by France A. Córdova
Preceded by Gordon P. Eaton	President of Iowa State University; 1991–2000	Succeeded by Gregory L. Geoffroy
Preceded by Joseph M. Marchello	Chancellor of University of Missouri–Rolla; 1986–1991	Succeeded by John T. Park
