= Dallas Lynn Peck =

American geologist and volcanologist (1929–2005)

Dallas L. Peck
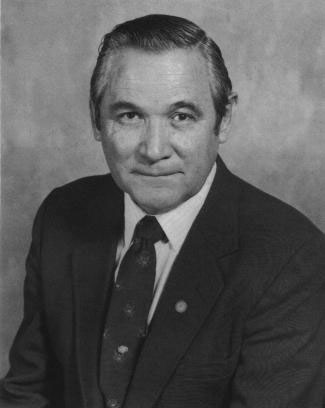
- Peck as Director of USGS, 1981–1993

11th Director of the United States Geological Survey
- In office 1981 – 1993
- Preceded by: Henry William Menard
- Succeeded by: Gordon P. Eaton

Personal details
- Born: March 28, 1929 Cheney, Washington, U.S.
- Died: August 21, 2005 (aged 76) Fairfax, Virginia, U.S.
- Scientific career
- Education: California Institute of Technology; Harvard University
- Fields: Geology, Volcanology
- Workplaces: U.S. Geological Survey
- Thesis: Geologic reconnaissance of the western Cascades in Oregon north of latitude 43 degrees (1960)

Dallas Lynn Peck (March 28, 1929 – August 21, 2005) was an American geologist and volcanologist. Peck was a native of Cheney, Washington. He received his bachelor's (1951) and master's (1953) degrees in geology from the California Institute of Technology. He received a doctorate in geology from Harvard University in 1960.

== Life ==
Dr. Peck graduated from the California Institute of Technology and Harvard University (Ph.D., 1960). He was born March 28, 1929, in Cheney, WA. Dr. Peck had resided in Virginia.

He spent his early career studying the volcanoes and volcanic rocks of Hawaii and the western United States. In the mid-1960s, he helped train U.S. astronauts on what to expect on the lunar landscape. He also was among the first U.S. scientists to work with the Soviet Union and China in cooperative earthquake research in the 1970s.

Throughout his career, he was an adviser to the National Science Foundation, a member of the National Research Council, and representative to the Third General Meeting of the U.S.-Japan Cooperative Sciences Program. His memberships included the American Association for the Advancement of Science, the American Geophysical Union and the Cosmos Club.

Peck died on August 21, 2005, at Inova Fairfax Hospital in Fairfax, Virginia, of complications from open-heart surgery in June 2005.

== USGS career ==
Dallas Peck was an authority on volcanoes who served as director of the U.S. Geological Survey from 1981 to 1993. He spent his entire career at the U.S. Geological Survey, starting in 1951. Peck worked in California and Hawaii before moving to the Washington, D.C., area in 1966. He was chief of the geologic division from 1977 until he was appointed director of the survey. During his tenure, he expanded the scope of the survey's work on mineral resources, global change, water quality and mapping.

Following his term as Director, he returned to the Geologic Division of USGS in 1993 to conduct research on the granites of Yosemite National Park and the Sierra Nevada and to serve as adviser in the Office of the Chief Geologist. In 1995 he retired from the USGS, but continued his research as an emeritus scientist until his death.

== Awards and honors ==
- The Dallas Peck Outstanding Scientist Emeritus Award is names in his honor.
- He received the Interior Department's awards for meritorious (1970) and distinguished service (1979) as well as the Presidential Meritorious Executive Award (1980).
- He received the Distinguished Alumni Award from the California Institute of Technology in 1985.
- A mountain range in Antarctica was named after him in 1989.

== Publications ==
- Geologic Map of the Yosemite Quadrangle, Central Sierra Nevada, California (2002) USGS IMAP No. 2751
- Yosemite Quadrangle, Central Sierra Nevada, California—Analytic Data (2001) USGS Open File Report No. 2001-252
- Karst hydrogeology in the United States, with Joseph W. Troester; John E. Moore. (1988) USGS Open File Report No. 88-476
- Merced Peak Quadrangle, central Sierra Nevada, California; analytic data, with G.K. Van Kooten (1983) USGS Professional Paper No. 1170-D
- Geologic map of the Merced Peak quadrangle, central Sierra Nevada, California (1980) USGS Geologic Quadrangle No. 1531
- Cooling and vesiculation of Alae lava lake, Hawaii (1978) USGS Professional Paper No. 935-B
- The eruption of August 1963 and the formation of Alae lava lake, Hawaii (1976) USGS Professional Paper No. 935-A
- Geology of the central and northern parts of the Western Cascade Range in Oregon, with A.B. Griggs, H.G. Schlicker, F. G. Wells, and H.M. Dole (1964) USGS Professional Paper No. 449
- Geologic reconnaissance of the Antelope-Ashwood area, north-central Oregon, with emphasis on the John Day Formation of late Oligocene and early Miocene age (1964) USGS Bulletin No. 1161-D
- Preliminary geologic map of the Merced Peak quadrangle, California (1964) USGS Miscellaneous Field Studies Map No. 281
- Preliminary geologic map of the Strawberry Mine area, Madera County, California (1962) USGS Open File Report No. 62-102
- Geologic map of Oregon west of the 121st meridian, prepared under the direction of F.G. Wells; compiled by D.L. Peck (1961) USGS IMAP No. 325
- Geologic reconnaissance of the Western Cascades in Oregon north of latitude 43 degrees (1960) USGS Open File Report No. 60-110

Government offices
Preceded by Henry William Menard	Director of the United States Geological Survey; 1981–1993	Succeeded by Gordon P. Eaton
