= Steven Leath =

American academic administrator (born 1957)

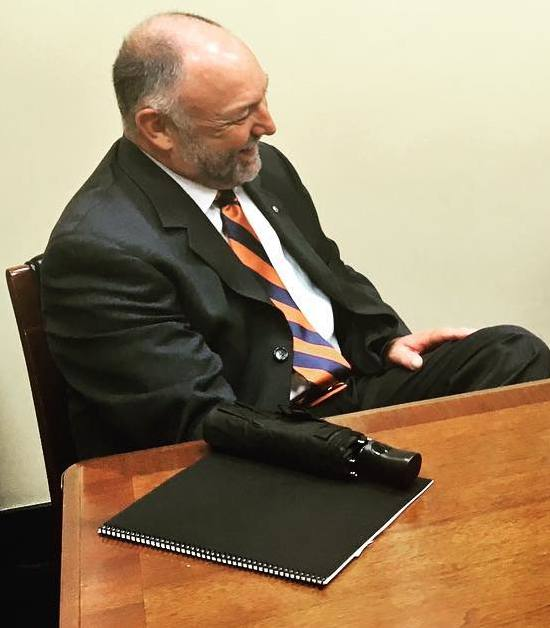
- Leath in 2017

19th President of Auburn University
- In office June 19, 2017 – June 21, 2019
- Preceded by: Jay Gogue
- Succeeded by: Jay Gogue (interim)

15th President of Iowa State University
- In office January 16, 2012 – March 20, 2017
- Preceded by: Gregory L. Geoffroy
- Succeeded by: Benjamin J. Allen (acting); Wendy Wintersteen

Vice President of Research at the University of North Carolina system
- In office 2007–2012

Personal details
- Born: July 8, 1957 (age 69) Providence, Rhode Island
- Spouse: Janet Leath (m. 1981)
- Children: Eric and Scott
- Education: Pennsylvania State University; University of Delaware; University of Illinois Urbana-Champaign
- Occupation: University President
- Scientific career
- Fields: Botany
- Workplaces: University of North Carolina; Iowa State University; Auburn University
- Thesis: Qualitative resistance to exserohilum turcicum race 2 in maize (1984)
- Doctoral advisor: Wayne Pedersen

Steven Leath (born July 8, 1957) is an American academic administrator. He was president of Iowa State University from 2012 to 2017, when he became president of Auburn University. He resigned from his position at Auburn in 2019.

== Early life and education ==
Leath was born in Providence, Rhode Island, moving to St. Paul, Minnesota at the age of two. He later moved again to central Pennsylvania, where he took up a number of sports, including hunting and fishing.

Leath obtained his bachelor's degree from Pennsylvania State University in 1979, studying plant science. Two years later he received his M.S. in plant pathology from the University of Delaware, and a Ph.D. in plant pathology and phytopathology from the University of Illinois Urbana-Champaign in 1984.

== Career ==
Prior to his position at Iowa State University, Leath was vice president for research for the 16-campus University of North Carolina system.

In 2013, he established 'ISU 4 Promise.' This program commits Iowa State to pay the college tuition of disadvantaged students from local elementary schools.

A notable event that occurred during Leath's tenure at Iowa State was his decision to permanently end Veishea after 2014. This was due to continued problems with violence that occurred during the festival, especially a series of violent disturbances that led to his suspending Veishea halfway through the festival in 2014.

After five years at Iowa State, Leath was named the president of Auburn University in 2017. While he was praised for record enrollment and investment in campus infrastructure, he was also criticized for personal use of a university aircraft.

During Leath's tenure, Auburn was designated an 'R1' institution by the Carnegie Classification of Institutions of Higher Education. The designation is reserved for doctoral universities with the highest levels of research activity.

In 2018, Leath was appointed to the National Science Board.

In June 2019, Leath resigned from Auburn, which paid him a $4.5 million severance.

In 2021, he was named the executive director of the council to Advance Hunting and the Shooting Sports. Leath departed his role as executive director on July 1 of 2025.

== Personal life ==
Leath and his wife have two sons, Eric and Scott.

An Instrument-rated pilot, Leath damaged a Cirrus SR-22 in 2016 owned by Iowa State while landing in what he claimed were gusty conditions in Bloomington, Illinois The ensuing controversy about the use of school property for personal travel, and the fact that the school paid for the damage, led to Leath publicly declaring that he would no longer fly state-owned aircraft.
