= Timothy Sands =

American materials engineer

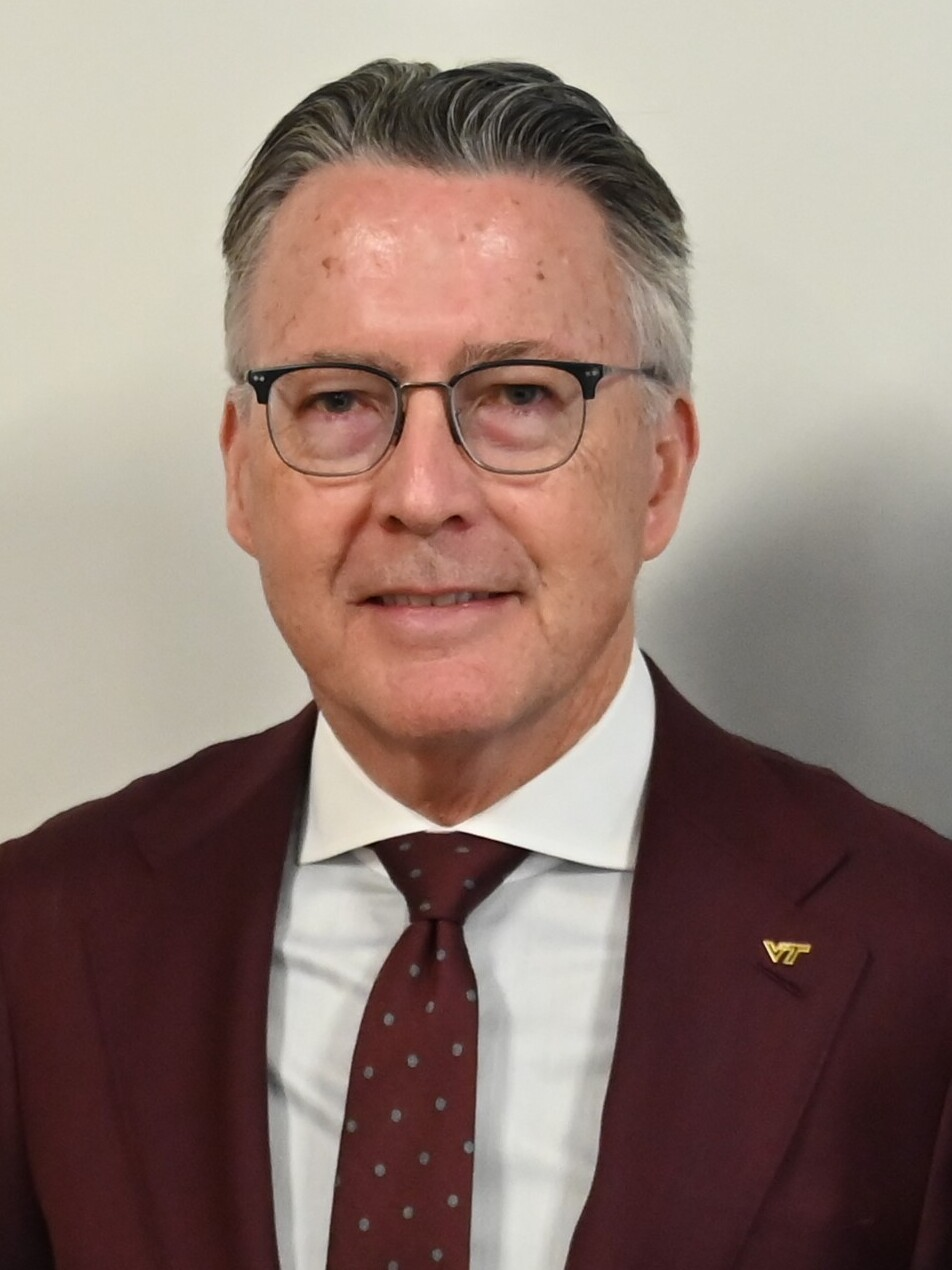
- Sands in 2024

16th President of Virginia Tech
- Incumbent
- Assumed office June 1, 2014
- Preceded by: Charles Steger

Provost of Purdue University
- In office April 1, 2010 – May 31, 2014
- Preceded by: Randy Woodson
- Succeeded by: Debasish Dutta

Acting President of Purdue University
- In office July 1, 2012 – January 14, 2013
- Preceded by: France Cordova
- Succeeded by: Mitch Daniels

Personal details
- Born: Timothy David Sands; March 26, 1958 (age 68) San Francisco, California, U.S.
- Spouse: Laura Prouty Sands
- Education: University of California, Berkeley (BS, MS, PhD)
- Website: www.president.vt.edu
- Scientific career
- Fields: Material science
- Workplaces: Solar Energy Research Institute; Bellcore; University of California, Berkeley; Purdue University; Virginia Tech
- Thesis: Formation and degradation of copper(2-x)sulfide / cadmium sulfide single crystal heterojunctions: a high resolution transmission electron microscope study (interface) (1984)

Timothy D. Sands (born March 26, 1958) is an American materials engineer who was the 16th president of Virginia Tech. On April 9, 2026, Sands announced he was stepping down from his post when a replacement was hired.

== Education ==
Sands earned his B.S. with highest honors in engineering physics in 1980, his M.S. in material science and engineering in 1981, and his Ph.D. in material science and engineering in 1984, all from the University of California, Berkeley.

== Current research ==
Sands has published more than 260 papers and has 16 patents in nanotechnology and microelectronics. Sands' current research focus is on the development of novel nanocomposite materials for environmentally friendly and cost-effective solid-state lighting, direct conversion of heat to electrical power and thermoelectric refrigeration. Sands is considered a leader in the field of light-emitting diodes (LEDs).

== Career ==
Sands began his career with an internship as a researcher at the Solar Energy Research Institute (SERI), now known as the National Renewable Energy Laboratory (NREL) in Golden, Colorado where he focused his efforts on renewable energy research. Following his graduation from U.C. Berkeley's doctoral program in Materials Science and Engineering in 1984, Sands continued his career as a member of the technical staff of the New Jersey–based technology firm Bellcore, now known as Telcordia. In 1991, Sands became the director of the Thin Films and Interface Science Research Group, and in 1992 he became the director of the Nonvolatile Memory Research Group.

=== UC Berkeley ===
Sands left industry in 1993 to return to academia as a professor in the Materials Science and Engineering department at his alma mater, U.C. Berkeley. In 1997, Sands became the Chair of the Applied Science and Technology Graduate Group at U.C. Berkeley.

=== Purdue University ===
In 2002, Sands left U.C. Berkeley for Purdue University in West Lafayette, Indiana to join the engineering faculty as the Basil S. Turner Professor of Engineering.

In 2006, Sands was tapped to lead the Birck Nanotechnology Center, the centerpiece of Purdue University's Discovery Park, as Director.

In 2010, Sands was appointed by Purdue University's Board of Trustees as Purdue's Executive Vice President for Academic Affairs and Provost.

In June 2012, Sands was appointed acting president of the Purdue University system following the retirement of its 11th president, France A. Córdova, until president-elect and then Indiana governor Mitch Daniels stepped down at the end of his gubernatorial term. As acting president, Sands presided over Purdue's West Lafayette and regional campuses. In January 2013, Sands returned to his role as Provost where he was responsible for all of Purdue's schools and colleges across campuses.

=== Virginia Tech ===
On December 6, 2013, Sands was announced as Virginia Tech's 16th president effective June 1, 2014.

=== Honors and awards ===
In 2009 and 2010, Sands was honored as a fellow of both the Materials Research Society (MRS) and the Institute of Electrical and Electronics Engineers (IEEE), respectively. In 2013, Sands was honored as a charter fellow in the 101-member inaugural class of the National Academy of Inventors (NAI). Sands is also a member of Phi Beta Kappa society and Tau Beta Pi.

== Family ==
Sands is married to Laura Sands, Ph.D., a faculty member in the Center for Gerontology and Professor of Human Development at Virginia Tech, as well as editor-in-chief of the open-access journal Innovation in Aging. The Sands' have four children, all of whom are Purdue graduates. Timothy Sands grew up in the San Francisco Bay Area, and was valedictorian at his high school.
