= Gordon P. Eaton =

American geologist (1929–2022)

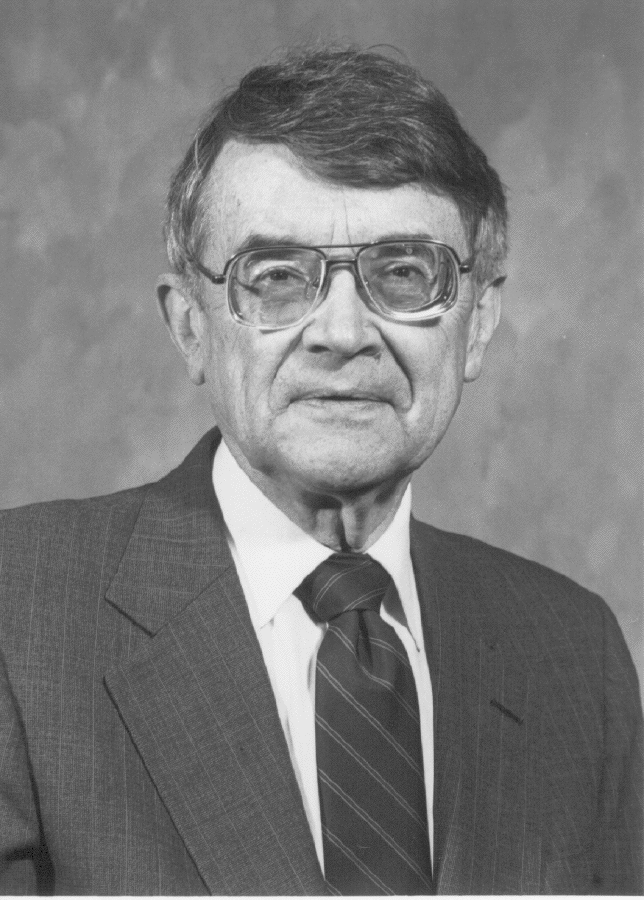
- Eaton as Director of USGS, 1994–1997

12th Director of the United States Geological Survey
- In office 1994 – 1997
- Preceded by: Dallas Lynn Peck
- Succeeded by: Charles G. Groat

12th President of Iowa State University
- In office 1986–1990
- Preceded by: W. Robert Parks
- Succeeded by: Martin C. Jischke

Personal details
- Born: March 9, 1929 Dayton, Ohio, U.S.
- Died: July 2, 2022 (aged 93) Bryan, Texas, U.S.
- Scientific career
- Education: Wesleyan University; California Institute of Technology
- Awards: 2016 Michel T. Halbouty Medal
- Fields: Geology, Geophysics
- Workplaces: Wesleyan University; University of California, Riverside; Lamont–Doherty Earth Observatory; Texas A&M University; Iowa State University; U.S. Geological Survey
- Thesis: Miocene volcanic activity in the Los Angeles Basin and vicinity (1957)
- Doctoral advisor: James A Noble

Gordon Pryor Eaton (March 9, 1929 – July 2, 2022) was an American geologist. Eaton was born in Dayton, Ohio.

== Life and career ==
Dr. Eaton graduated from Wesleyan University, with high Honors, High Distinction and Phi Beta Kappa and Sigma Xi recognition, with a B.A. in Geology in 1951; received an M.S. in Geology from the California Institute of Technology in 1953; and a Ph.D. in Geology and Geophysics in 1957 from the California Institute of Technology. At Wesleyan he was a member of Delta Upsilon fraternity.

Dr. Eaton held a number of academic positions. Eaton taught as his alma mater from 1955–1959. From 1959 to 1967, he was an assistant professor, associate professor, and chair of the Department of Geological Sciences at University of California, Riverside. From 1967 to 1981, he held various positions with the U.S. Geological Survey, including Associate Chief Geologist, Reston, Virginia, and scientist-in-charge, Hawaiian Volcano Observatory, Hawaii Volcanoes National Park, Hawaii. He was successively dean of the College of Geosciences and provost and vice president for academic affairs at Texas A&M University between 1981 and 1986. From 1986 to 1990, Eaton served as the 12th president of Iowa State University. On March 24, 1994, Dr. Gordon P. Eaton became the 12th Director of the U.S. Geological Survey, retiring from the post in 1997.

Dr. Eaton was a member of the American Association for the Advancement of Science, the Geological Society of America, and the American Geophysical Union. He was listed in Who's Who in America, Who's Who in the Midwest, Who's Who in the World, Who's Who in Science and Engineering, and American Men and Women of Science. He was a member of committee on the formation of the National Biological Survey, National Research Council. He also served on the Board on Earth Sciences and Resources and the Ocean Studies Board of the National Research Council.

Eaton died on July 2, 2022, in Bryan, Texas.

== Awards and honors ==
- Eaton Hall on the campus of Iowa State University was named for Eaton when it opened in 2002.

== Publications ==
- Epeirogeny in the Southern Rocky Mountains region; evidence and origin Geosphere, vol. 4, no. 5, pp. 764–784, Oct 2008
- Once a geologist, always a... the path to a university presidency... and back again The Compass, vol. 79, no. 1, pp. 27–28, 2005
- Disinformation, misinformation, or myths? Geotimes, vol. 42, no. 8, pp. 5, Aug 1997
- The new U. S. Geological Survey; environment, resources, and the future Environmental Geosciences, vol. 4, no. 1, pp. 3–10, Mar 1997
- The future of national geological surveys; global challenges, global opportunities Renewable Resources Journal, vol. 13, no. 2, pp. 14–17, 1995
- A tectonic redefinition of the Southern Rocky Mountains Tectonophysics, vol. 132, no. 1-3, pp. 163–193, 15 Dec 1986
- Recommendations for research in determining the probability of mineral occurrence with Robert G. Garrett. U.S. Geological Survey Circular No. 0980, pp. 278–282, 1986
- Mineral abundance in the North American Cordillera American Scientist, vol. 72, no. 4, pp. 368–377, Aug 1984
- The Basin and Range Province; origin and tectonic significance Annual Review of Earth and Planetary Sciences, vol. 10, pp. 409–440, 1982
- The 1977 eruption of Kilauea Volcano, Hawaii Journal of Volcanology and Geothermal Research, vol. 7, no. -4, pp. 189–210, May 1980

== Additional sources ==
- Iowa State University - Gordon P. Eaton Papers, 1972–1991

Academic offices
Preceded by W. Robert Parks	President of Iowa State University; 1986–1990	Succeeded by Martin C. Jischke
Government offices
Preceded by Dallas Lynn Peck	Director of the United States Geological Survey; 1994–1997	Succeeded by Charles G. Groat
