= Archipelagic apron =

Fan-shaped gently sloping region of sea floor found around oceanic islands

An archipelagic apron is a fan-shaped gently sloping region of sea floor found around oceanic islands, particularly in the south Pacific Ocean. The name was first proposed by Henry William Menard in 1956 because of the resemblance of the slope to an apron. While most such underwater sedimentary surfaces are generally smooth, some are rough in texture. The total volume occupied by an archipelagic apron is often many times that of the adjacent island. Hence, it is unlikely to have formed from sediments washed off the part of the island above sea level. Instead, archipelagic aprons most likely formed from debris avalanches and pyroclastic flows. The material is then reworked by turbidity currents to achieve their current form. Such aprons form about eight percent of the area of the Pacific basin.
