= Gregory L. Geoffroy =

American university administrator

Gregory Lynn Geoffroy is an American higher education administrator and professor of chemistry who served as the 14th president of Iowa State University from 2001 to 2012.

Geoffroy received his BA from the University of Louisville in 1968. He received his PhD in chemistry from California Institute of Technology in 1974. Between receiving his two degrees Geoffroy served from 1969 to 1970 in the United States Navy.

He became an assistant professor of chemistry at Pennsylvania State University in 1974 retaining that position until 1978, when he advanced to the rank of Associate Professor which he held until 1982 when he became a full professor. In 1988 Geoffroy became the head of the Pennsylvania State Chemistry Department. He only was in this position a year because in 1989 he became dean of the Eberly College of Science at Pennsylvania State. He retained this position until 1997 when he left Pennsylvania State to serve as Senior vice president for academic affairs and provost at the University of Maryland, College Park. Geoffroy remained in this last position until he assumed the presidency of Iowa State. After leaving Iowa State he assumed his new role as chairman of the board of trustees at Ashford University.

== Sources ==
- ISU President Gregory Geoffroy will step down
- Defining a decade: The presidency of Gregory L. Geoffroy

Academic offices
| Preceded by William Kirwan | acting President of the University of Maryland, College Park; 1998 | Succeeded by C. Daniel Mote Jr. |
| Preceded by Martin C. Jischke | 14th President of Iowa State University; 2001–2012 | Succeeded by Steven Leath |
