= Rollin C. Richmond =

American geneticist

President of Cal Poly Humboldt
- In office May 2002 – July 2014

Personal details
- Born: Rollin Charles Richmond
- Profession: Geneticist

Rollin Charles Richmond was the president of Cal Poly Humboldt in Arcata, California from May 2002 to July 2014. Before taking that position he was provost and genetics professor at Iowa State University, leading research on the genetic mechanisms of fruit flies evolution and effects of cocaine on Drosophila. He has also served in various positions at the State University of New York at Stony Brook, the University of South Florida, and Indiana University.

The November 7, 2007 issue of the Cal Poly Humboldt weekly student-run paper, The Lumberjack, reported that the Academic Senate at Cal Poly Humboldt voted by 56% to issue a vote of no confidence in Rollin Richmond's leadership.

Under his leadership Cal Poly Humboldt was recently reaccredited for ten years (maximum possible) by the Western Association of Schools and Colleges. They noted that significant change must occur at Cal Poly Humboldt including a reformulation of shared governance.
