= Adelante Fraternity =

Male social fraternity at Iowa State University

- Founded: September 1907 (118 years ago); Iowa State University
- Type: Social
- Affiliation: Independent
- Status: Active
- Scope: Local
- Colors: Royal Blue and Gold
- Symbol: Sword, Book, Shaking Hands, Shield and a Crown
- Chapters: 1
- Headquarters: 318 Welch Ave; Ames, Iowa 50014; United States
- Website: www.adelante.org

Adelante Fraternity is an all-male social fraternity that was founded at Iowa State University in September 1907. Adelante is one of the few fraternities not to adopt Greek letters. Today, Adelante remains an independent (local) fraternity and is one of the older local fraternities in the nation.

== History ==
In September 1907, six students founded a club "to break up a political clique that was controlling campus positions." The men set up high ideals of scholarship, fellowship, and leadership and adopted the Spanish word Adelante which means "forward." The Adelante Club was later incorporated as Adelante Fraternity on November 12, 1912. Since then, it has repeatedly turned down requests to become a chapter of a national social fraternity and is today Iowa State's only unaffiliated local fraternity.

The founders of Adelante are Henry E. Haefner, Rex J. Davidson, Don T. Griswold, Sr., Harold F. Luick, Walter H. Leckliter and George W. Godfrey.

The seeds of Adelante were sown during the 1906–07 school year at a boarding house on Lynn Avenue where the Sigma Alpha Epsilon house now stands. Several of the men who roomed there decided to stay together the next school year and rented a house on Stanton Avenue for the 1907-08 school year. Here the name of Adelante was coined, and a start was made toward an organization based on present needs rather than with the thought of forming a permanent fraternity.

In the beginning, the group had puritanical ideas - no drinking, smoking, or dancing. Emphasis was placed on scholarship in those days. Social privileges (i.e. dating, and reading of novels and popular magazines during extra hours) were suspended for any members not maintaining good grades. During World War I, the Adelantes became rather inactive because only two Adelante men were living in the house at the time, (the rest of the space was occupied by the Student's Army Training Corps) although several other Adelantes were scattered throughout the campus. To keep the fires of Adelante burning, the parlor of the 304 Welch house was secured as Adelante's headquarters.

During the depression years, money was very tight and affected pledging drastically. House bills had to be cut to induce men to pledge. So poor was the financial situation that it was suggested that Adelante merge with other fraternities. For various reasons, however, this idea was rejected.

During World War II things were difficult for Adelante. In the spring of 1943, all fraternities on campus agreed to move out and allow women to occupy the houses. Two members were allowed to live in the cook's room, and the men were allowed to use the basement. In the fall of 1944, the men were back in the house, but no meals were served for the first year of re-occupancy.

Adelante had many offers to join national organizations; it considered going national, but declined these offers and remained a local fraternity.

== Adelante today ==
The current house was constructed in 1972 and has a 32-member capacity. Its rooms are based on a suite system where two members share a common living area with individual wardrobes and desks. They further share a private bathroom and sleeping room, with two more members who live in another room on the other side of the suite. Because of this unique room setup, it has air-conditioning and heating in all parts of the house; most other fraternities have open-air sleeping dorms.

The Adelante house has several large common areas, shared by all members. These include a second-floor lounge and study area, a large living room with a fireplace, and a fully stocked kitchen and dining room.

To maintain the high living standards of Adelante, regular renovation projects are taken every year. Recent remodeling includes a new dining room, renovated second-floor living areas, remodeling of some suites, and a renovated living room.

Adelante is located two blocks from campus, on Welch Avenue, in the heart of Campus Town. Because of the varied restaurants, businesses, and stores nearby, you can usually find everything you need within walking distance. And for the occasions where traveling is a necessity, all Adelante members enjoy the luxury of on-site parking.
