= List of Sigma Delta Pi chapters =

Sigma Delta Pi, the National Collegiate Hispanic Honor Society (La Sociedad Nacional Honoraria Hispánica), was established on in 1919 at the University of California, Berkeley. It is a North American organization, with chapters being chartered in the United States and Canada. Following is a list of its chapters, with active chapters indicated in bold and inactive chapters and institutions in italics.

Chapter	Charter date and range	Institution	Location	Status	Ref.
**Alpha**	November 14, 1919	University of California, Berkeley	Berkeley, California	Active	
**Beta**	1921	University of Missouri	Columbia, Missouri	Active	
Gamma	1922–1966	University of Oregon	Eugene, Oregon	Inactive	
Delta	1922–1931, 1951–xxxx ?	University of Maryland, College Park	College Park, Maryland	Inactive	
**Epsilon**	1924	College of Wooster	Wooster, Ohio	Active	
**Zeta**	1925	University of Texas at Austin	Austin, Texas	Active	
**Eta**	1925	University of Southern California	Los Angeles, California	Active	
Theta	1925–1940	University of Idaho	Moscow, Idaho	Inactive	
**Iota**	May 8, 1954	University of California, Los Angeles	Los Angeles, California	Active	
Kappa	March 2, 1926– 1963	Stanford University	Stanford, California	Inactive	
Lambda	1926–xxxx ?	University of Illinois Urbana-Champaign	Urbana, Illinois	Inactive	
**Mu**	1927–1945; xxxx ?	Middlebury College	Middlebury, Vermont	Active	
Nu	1928	Baylor University	Waco, Texas	Inactive	
Xi	1928	Hunter College	New York City, New York	Inactive	
**Omicron**	1929	City College of New York	New York City, New York	Active	
**Pi**	1930	University of Arizona	Tucson, Arizona	Active	
**Rho**	April 14, 1931	University of Tennessee at Chattanooga	Chattanooga, Tennessee	Active	
**Sigma**	1931	University of Mary Hardin–Baylor	Belton, Texas	Active	
**Tau**	1931	Adelphi University	Garden City, New York	Active	
Upsilon	1931–1969	Dominican University of California	San Rafael, California	Inactive	
**Phi**	1931	Denison University	Granville, Ohio	Active	
**Chi**	January 30, 1931– 1936; 1967	University of South Carolina	Columbia, South Carolina	Active	
**Psi**	1931	University of Wisconsin–Madison	Madison, Wisconsin	Active	
Omega	1931–xxxx ?	Davidson College	Davidson, North Carolina	Inactive	
**Alpha Alpha**	1932	Miami University	Oxford, Ohio	Active	
**Alpha Beta**	1934	Rutgers University–New Brunswick	New Brunswick, New Jersey	Active	
Alpha Gamma	1935	California State University, Fresno	Fresno, California	Inactive	
**Alpha Delta**	1935	Florida State University	Tallahassee, Florida	Active	
Alpha Epsilon	1935	San Jose State University	San Jose, California	Inactive	
Alpha Zeta	1935	Western Colorado University	Gunnison, Colorado	Inactive	
**Alpha Eta**	1936	Southern Methodist University	Dallas, Texas	Active	
Alpha Theta	1936	Duke University	Durham, North Carolina	Inactive	
**Alpha Iota**	1937	University of Texas at El Paso	El Paso, Texas	Active	
**Alpha Kappa**	1937–1970, xxxx ?	Stetson University	DeLand, Florida	Active	
**Alpha Lambda**	1937	Louisiana State University	Baton Rouge, Louisiana	Active	
Alpha Mu	1937–1969	San Francisco College for Women	San Francisco, California	Inactive	(Note: The college was acquired by the University of San Francisco in 1978.)
**Alpha Nu**	1937	Baldwin Wallace University	Berea, Ohio	Active	
**Alpha Xi**	1938	Vanderbilt University	Nashville, Tennessee	Active	
Alpha Omicron	1938–1945	Louisiana College	Pineville, Louisiana	Inactive	
**Alpha Pi**	1938	University of North Texas	Denton, Texas	Active	
**Alpha Rho**	1941	University of Louisiana at Lafayette	Lafayette, Louisiana	Active	(Note: Chapter formed from Southwestern Louisiana Institute of Liberal and Technical Learning, now University of Louisiana at Lafayette.)
**Alpha Sigma**	1941	Hofstra University	Hempstead, New York	Active	
**Alpha Tau**	December 11, 1941	University of North Carolina at Greensboro	Greensboro, North Carolina	Active	
Alpha Upsilon	February 14, 1943	Bucknell University	Lewisburg, Pennsylvania	Inactive	
**Alpha Phi**	February 14, 1944	Texas Tech University	Lubbock, Texas	Active	
**Alpha Chi**	March 1, 1944	University of Miami	Coral Gables, Florida	Active	
**Alpha Psi**	April 12, 1944	University of Tennessee	Knoxville, Tennessee	Active	
**Alpha Omega**	May 6, 1944	Louisiana Tech University	Ruston, Louisiana	Active	
**Beta Alpha**	1945	University of Alabama	Tuscaloosa, Alabama	Active	
**Beta Beta**	1945	Michigan State University	East Lansing, Michigan	Active	
Beta Gamma	1945–xxxx ?	LIU Brooklyn	New York City, New York	Inactive	
Beta Delta	1946–xxxx ?	Judson College	Marion, Alabama	Inactive	(Note: The college closed in 2021.)
Beta Epsilon	1946	University of Toledo	Toledo, Ohio	Active	
Beta Zeta	1947–1970	Willamette University	Salem, Oregon	Inactive	
Beta Eta	1947–xxxx ?	New Mexico State University	Las Cruces, New Mexico	Inactive	
Beta Theta	1947–1973?	New York University, University Heights	Bronx, New York	Inactive	(Note: New York University sold the Heights campus in 1973.)
Beta Iota	1948–1953	University of British Columbia	Vancouver, British Columbia, Canada	Inactive	
**Beta Kappa**	1948–1970, xxxx ?	Marshall University	Huntington, West Virginia	Active	
Beta Lambda	1948–xxxx ?	Kent State University	Kent, Ohio	Inactive	
**Beta Mu**	1948	Bowling Green State University	Bowling Green, Ohio	Active	
**Beta Nu**	1948–1970, xxxx ?	University at Buffalo	Buffalo, New York	Active	
**Beta Xi**	May 1, 1948	Dominican University	River Forest, Illinois	Active	
Beta Omicron	1948–1970	University of Michigan	Ann Arbor, Michigan	Inactive	
**Beta Pi**	1949	University of Kansas	Lawrence, Kansas	Active	
**Beta Rho**	1949–1950, xxxx ?	University of Florida	Gainesville, Florida	Active	
**Beta Sigma**	1949	Hardin–Simmons University	Abilene, Texas	Active	
Beta Tau	1949–1950, 1967–xxxx ?	Barat College	Lake Forest, Illinois	Inactive	(Note: The college closed in 2005.)
**Beta Upsilon**	1949	Northern Illinois University	DeKalb, Illinois	Active	
Beta Phi	1949–1950, 1967–xxxx ?	University of Southern Mississippi	Hattiesburg, Mississippi	Inactive	
Beta Chi	1949–xxxx ?	West Virginia State University	Institute, West Virginia	Inactive	
Beta Psi	1950–1970	Lincoln Memorial University	Harrogate, Tennessee	Inactive	
**Beta Omega**	1950–1969, xxxx ?	Washington University in St. Louis	St. Louis, Missouri	Active	
Gamma Alpha	1950–1951	University of Iowa	Iowa City, Iowa	Inactive	
Gamma Beta	1950–xxxx ?	College of Saint Teresa	Winona, Minnesota	Inactive	(Note: The college closed in 1989.)
**Gamma Gamma**	May 10, 1950	Marquette University	Milwaukee, Wisconsin	Active	
**Gamma Delta**	1950	University of Memphis	Memphis, Tennessee	Active	
**Gamma Epsilon**	1950	University of Arkansas	Fayetteville, Arkansas	Active	
**Gamma Zeta**	1950	Columbia University	New York City, New York	Active	
Gamma Eta	1951–xxxx ?	Tennessee State University	Nashville, Tennessee	Inactive	
Gamma Theta	1951–1970	University of Oklahoma	Norman, Oklahoma	Inactive	
**Gamma Iota**	1951	Drury University	Springfield, Missouri	Active	
Gamma Kappa	1952–xxxx ?	West Texas A&M University	Canyon, Texas	Inactive	
**Gamma Lambda**	1952	Texas A&M University–Kingsville	Kingsville, Texas	Active	
**Gamma Mu**	April 29, 1952	Washington & Jefferson College	Washington, Pennsylvania	Active	
**Gamma Nu**	1952	Wichita State University	Wichita, Kansas	Active	
**Gamma Xi**	May 6, 1952	Wofford College	Spartanburg, South Carolina	Active	
**Gamma Omicron**	1952–1970, xxxx ?	University of Pennsylvania	Philadelphia, Pennsylvania	Active	
**Gamma Pi**	1952	College of William & Mary	Williamsburg, Virginia	Active	
Gamma Rho	1952–xxxx ?	University of Houston	Houston, Texas	Inactive	
**Gamma Sigma**	1953	Georgetown College	Georgetown, Kentucky	Active	
Gamma Tau	1953–xxxx ?	University of Cincinnati	Cincinnati, Ohio	Inactive	
Gamma Upsilon	1953–1969	Rice University	Houston, Texas	Inactive	
**Gamma Phi**	1953	Marietta College	Marietta, Ohio	Active	
**Gamma Chi**	1954	Carson–Newman University	Jefferson City, Tennessee	Active	
**Gamma Psi**	May 8, 1954	California State University, Los Angeles	Los Angeles, California	Active	
Gamma Omega	1954–xxxx ?	University of Connecticut	Storrs, Connecticut	Inactive	
**Delta Alpha**	1954	Queens College, City University of New York	New York City, New York	Active	
**Delta Beta**	1954–1955	Midwestern State University	Wichita Falls, Texas	Active	
**Delta Gamma**	1955	University of Georgia	Athens, Georgia	Active	
**Delta Delta**	1955	Western New Mexico University	Silver City, New Mexico	Active	
**Delta Epsilon**	1956–1969, xxxx ?	DePaul University	Chicago, Illinois	Active	
**Delta Zeta**	March 17, 1956	Monmouth College	Monmouth, Illinois	Active	
**Delta Eta**	1956	George Washington University	Washington, D.C.	Active	
**Delta Theta**	1956	Emporia State University	Emporia, Kansas	Active	
**Delta Iota**	1957	University of Mississippi	Lafayette County, Mississippi	Active	
**Delta Kappa**	1958	Temple University	Philadelphia, Pennsylvania	Active	
Delta Lambda	1959–xxxx ?	Oregon State University	Corvallis, Oregon	Inactive	
Delta Mu	1959–xxxx ?	University of Portland	Portland, Oregon	Inactive	
**Delta Nu**	April 26, 1959	Samford University	Homewood, Alabama	Active	
Delta Xi	1959–xxxx ?	Mississippi University for Women	Columbus, Mississippi	Inactive	
**Delta Omicron**	May 10, 1959	Mount St. Mary's University	Emmitsburg, Maryland	Active	
**Delta Pi**	April 7, 1959	Brigham Young University	Provo, Utah	Active	
Delta Rho	1960–1969	D'Youville College	Buffalo, New York	Inactive	
**Delta Sigma**	1960	Purdue University	West Lafayette, Indiana	Active	
**Delta Tau**	1960	West Virginia University	Morgantown, West Virginia	Active	
**Delta Upsilon**	1960	Butler University	Indianapolis, Indiana	Active	
Delta Phi	1961–xxxx ?	Marygrove College	Detroit, Michigan	Inactive	(Note: The college closed in 2019.)
**Delta Chi**	1961	Montclair State University	Montclair, New Jersey	Active	
**Delta Psi**	1961	University of Wisconsin–Eau Claire	Eau Claire, Wisconsin	Active	
**Delta Omega**	1961	Austin College	Sherman, Texas	Active	
Epsilon Alpha	1962	Thiel College	Greenville, Pennsylvania	Inactive	
**Epsilon Beta**	1962	Texas State University	San Marcos, Texas	Active	
**Epsilon Gamma**	1962–1967	Mississippi State University	Mississippi State, Mississippi	Active	
**Epsilon Delta**	1962	Dickinson College	Carlisle, Pennsylvania	Active	
**Epsilon Epsilon**	May 4, 1962	Winthrop University	Rock Hill, South Carolina	Active	
**Epsilon Zeta**	1962	Scripps College	Claremont, California	Active	
**Epsilon Eta**	1963	University of Montevallo	Montevallo, Alabama	Active	
**Epsilon Theta**	1963	University of Wisconsin–La Crosse	La Crosse, Wisconsin	Active	
**Epsilon Iota**	1963	University of Wisconsin–Milwaukee	Milwaukee, Wisconsin	Active	
**Epsilon Kappa**	April 17, 1964	St. John's University	New York City, New York	Active	
**Epsilon Lambda**	1964	Georgian Court University	Lakewood Township, New Jersey	Active	
Epsilon Mu	1964–xxxx ?	Western Kentucky University	Bowling Green, Kentucky	Inactive	
**Epsilon Nu**	1964	Slippery Rock University	Slippery Rock, Pennsylvania	Active	
**Epsilon Xi**	1964	Kansas State University	Manhattan, Kansas	Active	
Epsilon Omicron	1964–xxxx ?	Appalachian State University	Boone, North Carolina	Inactive	
**Epsilon Pi**	1965	Hope College	Holland, Michigan	Active	
Epsilon Rho	1965–xxxx ?	Holy Names University	Oakland, California	Inactive	(Note: The university closed in 2023.)
Epsilon Sigma	1965–xxxx ?	Salve Regina University	Newport, Rhode Island	Inactive	
**Epsilon Tau**	1965	Westminster College	New Wilmington, Pennsylvania	Active	
**Epsilon Upsilon**	April 23, 1965	University of Kentucky	Lexington, Kentucky	Active	
Epsilon Phi	1965–xxxx ?	Texas Southern University	Houston, Texas	Inactive	
**Epsilon Chi**	1965	Augustana College	Rock Island, Illinois	Active	
**Epsilon Psi**	1965	Stephen F. Austin State University	Nacogdoches, Texas	Active	
**Epsilon Omega**	1966	Trinity University	San Antonio, Texas	Active	
Zeta Alpha	1966–xxxx ?	University of Texas at Arlington	Arlington, Texas	Inactive	
Zeta Beta	1966–1966	Mills College	Oakland, California	Inactive	
Zeta Gamma	July 29, 1966– xxxx ?	University of Utah	Salt Lake City, Utah	Inactive	
**Zeta Delta**	1966	University of the Pacific	Stockton, California	Active	
**Zeta Epsilon**	1967	Centre College	Danville, Kentucky	Active	
**Zeta Zeta**	May 12, 1967	University of Virginia	Charlottesville, Virginia	Active	
**Zeta Eta**	1967	Eastern Illinois University	Charleston, Illinois	Active	
Zeta Theta	May 19, 1967– xxxx ?	St. Francis College	Brooklyn, New York	Inactive	
**Zeta Iota**	May 1, 1967– 1967, xxxx ?	Maryville College	Maryville, Tennessee	Active	
Zeta Kappa	1967–xxxx ?	University of Maine	Orono, Maine	Inactive	
**Zeta Lambda**	1967	University of Wisconsin–Whitewater	Whitewater, Wisconsin	Active	
**Zeta Mu**	1967	Eckerd College	St. Petersburg, Florida	Active	
**Zeta Nu**	1967	Rider University	Lawrence Township, New Jersey	Active	
**Zeta Xi**	1967	University of Montana	Missoula, Montana	Active	
Zeta Omicron	1967–xxxx ?	University of Nevada, Las Vegas	Paradise, Nevada	Inactive	
**Zeta Pi**	1967	California State University, San Bernardino	San Bernardino, California	Active	
**Zeta Rho**	1968	Millsaps College	Jackson, Mississippi	Active	
**Zeta Sigma**	1968	University of Arkansas at Little Rock	Little Rock, Arkansas	Active	
Zeta Tau	1968–xxxx ?	Fairfield University	Fairfield, Connecticut	Inactive	
Zeta Upsilon	1968–xxxx ?	Murray State University	Murray, Kentucky	Inactive	
**Zeta Phi**	1968	Georgia Southern University	Statesboro, Georgia	Active	
Zeta Chi	1968–1970	Fontbonne University	Clayton, Missouri	Inactive	
**Zeta Psi**	1968	University of North Carolina at Chapel Hill	Chapel Hill, North Carolina	Active	
**Zeta Omega**	1968	University of California, Riverside	Riverside, California	Active	
Eta Alpha	1968–xxxx ?	State University of New York at Fredonia	Fredonia, New York	Inactive	
**Eta Beta**	1968	San Diego State University	San Diego, California	Active	
**Eta Gamma**	1968	Towson University	Towson, Maryland	Active	
**Eta Delta**	1968–1970, xxxx ?	Texas Wesleyan University	Fort Worth, Texas	Active	
**Eta Epsilon**	1968	Transylvania University	Lexington, Kentucky	Active	
**Eta Zeta**	1968	University of San Diego	San Diego, California	Active	
**Eta Eta**	1968	Ohio Northern University	Ada, Ohio	Active	
Eta Theta	1968–xxxx ?	Commonwealth University-Mansfield	Mansfield, Pennsylvania	Inactive	
**Eta Iota**	1968	Lamar University	Beaumont, Texas	Active	
**Eta Kappa**	1968	University of Akron	Akron, Ohio	Active	
**Eta Lambda**	1968	Missouri State University	Springfield, Missouri	Active	
**Eta Mu**	1969	Eastern Kentucky University	Richmond, Kentucky	Active	
**Eta Nu**	1969	Angelo State University	San Angelo, Texas	Active	
Eta Xi	1969–xxxx ?	Rutgers University–Camden College of Arts and Sciences	Camden, New Jersey	Inactive	
Eta Omicron	1969–xxxx ?	Gordon College	Wenham, Massachusetts	Inactive	
**Eta Pi**	1969	Monmouth University	West Long Branch, New Jersey	Active	
**Eta Rho**	1969	University of Central Oklahoma	Edmond, Oklahoma	Active	
**Eta Sigma**	1969–1969, xxxx ?	University of Wisconsin–Oshkosh	Oshkosh, Wisconsin	Active	
**Eta Tau**	1969	University of Dayton	Dayton, Ohio	Active	
**Eta Upsilon**	1969	Illinois State University	Normal, Illinois	Active	
**Eta Phi**	1969	LIU Post	Brookville, New York	Active	
Eta Chi	1969–xxxx ?	College of the Ozarks	Point Lookout, Missouri	Inactive	
**Eta Psi**	1969	University at Albany, SUNY	Albany, New York	Active	
Eta Omega	1969–xxxx ?	Georgia State University	Atlanta, Georgia	Inactive	
Theta Alpha	1969	Lehman College	Bronx, New York	Inactive	
**Theta Beta**	1969	University of Rhode Island	Kingston, Rhode Island	Active	
**Theta Gamma**	1969	University of New Hampshire	Durham, New Hampshire	Active	
**Theta Delta**	1969	Auburn University	Auburn, Alabama	Active	
Theta Epsilon	1969–xxxx ?	Arizona State University	Tempe, Arizona	Inactive	
**Theta Zeta**	1969	East Texas A&M University	Commerce, Texas	Active	
**Theta Eta**	1969	University of Northern Iowa	Cedar Falls, Iowa	Active	
**Theta Theta**	1970	Central Michigan University	Mount Pleasant, Michigan	Active	
**Theta Iota**	1970–1970, xxxx ?	Prairie View A&M University	Prairie View, Texas	Active	
**Theta Kappa**	1970	Concordia College	Moorhead, Minnesota	Active	
**Theta Lambda**	1970	St. Catherine University	Saint Paul, Minnesota	Active	
**Theta Mu**	1970	St. Lawrence University	Canton, New York	Active	
**Theta Nu**	1970	University of Colorado Boulder	Boulder, Colorado	Active	
**Theta Xi**	1970	Howard University	Washington, D.C.	Active	
Theta Omicron	1970–xxxx ?	Edinboro University of Pennsylvania	Edinboro, Pennsylvania	Inactive	
**Theta Pi**	1970	East Tennessee State University	Johnson City, Tennessee	Active	
Theta Rho	April 25, 1971– xxxx ?	Seton Hall University	South Orange, New Jersey	Inactive	
Theta Sigma	1970–xxxx ?	Mars Hill College	Mars Hill, North Carolina	Inactive	
**Theta Tau**	1971	University of Hawaiʻi at Mānoa	Honolulu, Hawaii	Active	
Theta Upsilon	May 1, 1971– xxxx ?	Newberry College	Newberry, South Carolina	Inactive	
**Theta Phi**	April 26, 1971	Southern Arkansas University	Magnolia, Arkansas	Active	
Theta Chi	1971–xxxx ?	Fort Wright College	Toppenish, Washington	Inactive	(Note: The chapter was formed at Fort Wright College, which moved and became Heritage College in 1982. The former Spokane campus operated as a satellite location until it was closed in 1993.)
Theta Psi	1971–xxxx ?; October 18, 2016	Oakland University	Rochester, Michigan	Inactive	
**Theta Omega**	1971	University of St. Thomas	Houston, Texas	Active	
**Iota Alpha**	1971	Iona University	New Rochelle, New York	Active	
Iota Beta	May 29, 1971– xxxx ?	Davis & Elkins College	Elkins, West Virginia	Inactive	
Iota Gamma	1971–xxxx ?	Park University	Parkville, Missouri	Inactive	
**Iota Delta**	1971–xxxx ?	Southwestern University	Georgetown, Texas	Active	
Iota Epsilon	1971–xxxx ?	University of North Carolina at Pembroke	Pembroke, North Carolina	Inactive	
Iota Zeta	1971–xxxx ?	California State University, Sacramento	Sacramento, California	Inactive	
Iota Eta	1971–xxxx ?	Colby College	Waterville, Maine	Inactive	
Iota Theta	1971–xxxx ?	Chapman University	Orange, California	Inactive	
**Iota Iota**	1971	York College, City University of New York	Jamaica, Queens, New York City, New York	Active	
**Iota Kappa**	1971	California State University, Sacramento	Sacramento, California	Active	
Iota Lambda	1971–xxxx ?	College of New Rochelle	New Rochelle, New York	Inactive	
**Iota Mu**	February 26, 1972	Indiana University of Pennsylvania	Indiana, Pennsylvania	Active	
**Iota Nu**	1972	University of Southern Indiana	Evansville, Indiana	Active	
Iota Xi	1972–xxxx ?	Lindenwood University	St. Charles, Missouri	Inactive	
Iota Omicron	April 25, 1972– xxxx ?	Cleveland State University	Cleveland, Ohio	Inactive	
**Iota Pi**	1972	Ithaca College	Ithaca, New York	Active	
**Iota Rho**	May 30, 1972	Loyola Marymount University	Los Angeles, California	Active	
Iota Sigma	1972–xxxx ?	Loyola University Chicago	Chicago, Illinois	Inactive	
**Iota Tau**	1972–xxxx ?; 20xx ?	Rowan University	Glassboro, New Jersey	Active	
**Iota Upsilon**	1972	Northern Arizona University	Flagstaff, Arizona	Active	
**Iota Phi**	November 11, 1972	Clemson University	Clemson, South Carolina	Active	
Iota Chi	1972–xxxx ?	State University of New York at Plattsburgh	Plattsburgh, New York	Inactive	
**Iota Psi**	1972	Frostburg State University	Frostburg, Maryland	Active	
**Iota Omega**	May 10, 1973	Wright State University	Fairborn, Ohio	Active	
**Kappa Alpha**	1973	Catholic University of America	Washington, D.C.	Active	
Kappa Beta	1973–xxxx ?	Spring Hill College	Mobile, Alabama	Inactive	
Kappa Gamma	1973–xxxx ?	Georgia Southwestern College	Americus, Georgia	Inactive	
Kappa Delta	1973–xxxx ?	Wagner College	Staten Island, New York	Inactive	
Kappa Epsilon	1973–1975	Sacred Heart Dominican College (aka Dominican College)	Houston, Texas	Inactive	(Note: The college has closed in 1975.)
**Kappa Zeta**	1973	Sam Houston State University	Huntsville, Texas	Active	
**Kappa Eta**	1973	Roanoke College	Salem, Virginia	Active	
Kappa Theta	1973–xxxx ?	Morris Harvey College	Charleston, West Virginia	Inactive	(Note: The college became the University of Charleston in 1978.)
**Kappa Iota**	1973	Florida Southern College	Lakeland, Florida	Active	
Kappa Kappa	1973–xxxx ?	Worcester State College	Worcester, Massachusetts	Inactive	
**Kappa Lambda**	1973	East Texas Baptist University	Marshall, Texas	Active	
Kappa Mu	1973–xxxx ?	Bates College	Lewiston, Maine	Inactive	
Kappa Nu	1973–xxxx ?	Dillard University	New Orleans, Louisiana	Inactive	
**Kappa Xi**	1973	Bethany College	Bethany, West Virginia	Active	
Kappa Omicron	1973–xxxx ?	Lowell State College	Lowell, Massachusetts	Inactive	(Note: In 1978, the college merged to form the University of Lowell, now the University of Massachusetts Lowell.)
Kappa Pi	1974–xxxx ?	College of Notre Dame of Maryland	Baltimore, Maryland	Inactive	
**Kappa Rho**	1974	Oral Roberts University	Tulsa, Oklahoma	Active	
**Kappa Sigma**	1974	Albertus Magnus College	New Haven, Connecticut	Active	
**Kappa Tau**	1974	Fort Lewis College	Durango, Colorado	Active	
**Kappa Upsilon**	1974	University of Delaware	Newark, Delaware	Active	
**Kappa Phi**	1974	Friends University	Wichita, Kansas	Active	
**Kappa Chi**	1974	Baruch College	New York City, New York	Active	
Kappa Psi	1974–xxxx ?	Georgia College & State University	Milledgeville, Georgia	Inactive	
**Kappa Omega**	1974	Saint Louis University	St. Louis, Missouri	Active	
**Lambda Alpha**	1974	Texas Christian University	Fort Worth, Texas	Active	
**Lambda Beta**	1974	Georgetown University	Washington, D.C.	Active	
**Lambda Gamma**	1975	University of North Carolina at Asheville	Asheville, North Carolina	Active	
**Lambda Delta**	1975	Hood College	Frederick, Maryland	Active	
Lambda Epsilon	1975–xxxx ?	McMurry University	Abilene, Texas	Inactive	
**Lambda Zeta**	1975	Valparaiso University	Valparaiso, Indiana	Active	
**Lambda Eta**	1975	Knox College	Galesburg, Illinois	Active	
**Lambda Theta**	1975	Cornell University	Ithaca, New York	Active	
Lambda Iota	1975–xxxx ?	Wittenberg University	Springfield, Ohio	Inactive	
Lambda Kappa	1976–xxxx ?	Northwestern State University	Natchitoches, Louisiana	Inactive	
**Lambda Lambda**	1976	Wheaton College	Norton, Massachusetts	Active	
Lambda Mu	April 14, 1976– xxxx ?	Columbia College	Columbia, South Carolina	Inactive	
**Lambda Nu**	1976	Spelman College	Atlanta, Georgia	Active	
Lambda Xi	1976–xxxx ?	Colgate University	Hamilton, New York	Inactive	
**Lambda Omicron**	1976	Hamline University	Saint Paul, Minnesota	Active	
Lambda Pi	1976–xxxx ?	University of South Alabama	Mobile, Alabama	Inactive	
**Lambda Rho**	1976	Stonehill College	Easton, Massachusetts	Active	
**Lambda Sigma**	December 1, 1976	University of Louisiana at Monroe	Monroe, Louisiana	Active	
**Lambda Tau**	1976	Texas A&M University	College Station, Texas	Active	
**Lambda Upsilon**	1976	Southern Nazarene University	Bethany, Oklahoma	Active	
Lambda Phi	1976–xxxx ?	Montana State University	Bozeman, Montana	Inactive	
Lambda Chi	1976–xxxx ?	Old Dominion University	Norfolk, Virginia	Active	
Lambda Psi	1977–xxxx ?	Virginia Tech	Blacksburg, Virginia	Active	
Lambda Omega	1977–xxxx ?	Emory and Henry University	Emory, Virginia	Active	
Mu Alpha	1977–xxxx ?	University of New Mexico	Albuquerque, New Mexico	Inactive	
Mu Beta	1977–xxxx ?	Alfred University	Alfred, New York	Inactive	
Mu Gamma	1977–xxxx ?	Trinity College	Hartford, Connecticut	Inactive	
**Mu Delta**	1977	Nazareth University	Pittsford, New York	Active	
**Mu Epsilon**	1977–xxxx ?	University of Louisville	Louisville, Kentucky	Active	
**Mu Zeta**	1977	Carroll University	Waukesha, Wisconsin	Active	
Mu Eta	1977–xxxx ?	Gannon University	Erie, Pennsylvania	Inactive	
**Mu Theta**	1977	University of Tennessee at Martin	Martin, Tennessee	Active	
**Mu Iota**	1977	University of Redlands	Redlands, California	Active	
**Mu Kappa**	1977	Loyola University New Orleans	New Orleans, Louisiana	Active	
Mu Lambda	1977–xxxx ?	Ohio State University	Columbus, Ohio	Inactive	
Mu Mu				Unassigned	(Note: The name Mu Mu was skipped because of fear that this name would "invite laughter". Instead, the chapter was named Theta of Louisiana, with the eighth letter of the Greek alphabet being selected to represent the eighth chapter in Louisiana.)
Theta of Louisiana	December 2, 1977	Tulane University	New Orleans, Louisiana	Inactive	
Mu Nu	December 30, 1977	Xavier University of Louisiana	New Orleans, Louisiana	Inactive	
**Mu Xi**	1977	Northeastern Illinois University	Chicago, Illinois	Active	
**Mu Omicron**	1977	University of Texas at Tyler	Tyler, Texas	Active	
Mu Pi	1977–xxxx ?	George Mason University	Fairfax County, Virginia	Inactive	
**Mu Rho**	1977	State University of New York at Cortland	Cortland, New York	Active	
Mu Sigma	December 1977–xxxx ?	Lipscomb University	Nashville, Tennessee	Inactive	
**Mu Tau**	1977	Manhattan University	New York City, New York	Active	
**Mu Upsilon**	1977	Oklahoma State University	Stillwater, Oklahoma	Active	
**Mu Phi**	1977	University of Massachusetts Dartmouth	Dartmouth, Massachusetts	Active	
Mu Chi	1977–xxxx ?	Southeastern Louisiana University	Hammond, Louisiana	Inactive	
**Mu Psi**	1977–xxxx ?, 2005	James Madison University	Harrisonburg, Virginia	Active	
Mu Omega	1977–xxxx ?	College of St. Francis	Joliet, Illinois	Inactive	
Nu Alpha	June 1977–xxxx ?	California State University, Stanislaus	Turlock, California	Inactive	
**Nu Beta**	197x ?	Baker University	Baldwin City, Kansas	Active	
**Nu Gamma**	April 1, 1978	Hartwick College	Oneonta, New York	Active	
**Nu Delta**	197x ?–xxxx ?; 20xx ?	Fordham University	New York City, New York	Active	
Nu Epsilon	197x ?–xxxx ?	Youngstown State University	Youngstown, Ohio	Inactive	
**Nu Zeta**	November 21, 1977	College of Charleston	Charleston, South Carolina	Active	
**Nu Eta**	197x ?	Lee University	Cleveland, Tennessee	Active	
**Nu Theta**	1978	Framingham State University	Framingham, Massachusetts	Active	
**Nu Iota**	1978	Buffalo State University	Buffalo, New York	Active	
**Nu Kappa**	1978	Benedictine University	Lisle, Illinois	Active	(Note: Chapter formed at Illinois Benedictine College, now Benedictine University.)
**Nu Lambda**	1978	Lubbock Christian University	Lubbock, Texas	Active	
**Nu Mu**	1978	High Point University	High Point, North Carolina	Active	
Nu Nu					
**Nu Xi**	1978	Valdosta State University	Valdosta, Georgia	Active	
**Nu Omicron**	1978	University of South Dakota	Vermillion, South Dakota	Active	
**Nu Pi**	1978	Asbury University	Wilmore, Kentucky	Active	
**Nu Rho**	January 26, 1978	Providence College	Providence, Rhode Island	Active	
**Nu Sigma**	197x ?	University of Denver	Denver, Colorado	Active	
**Nu Tau**	197x ?	University of San Francisco	San Francisco, California	Active	
**Nu Upsilon**	May 5, 1979	Gustavus Adolphus College	St. Peter, Minnesota	Active	
Nu Phi	1979–xxxx ?	Vassar College	Poughkeepsie, New York	Inactive	
**Nu Chi**	1979	Eastern Connecticut State University	Willimantic, Connecticut	Active	
**Nu Psi**	1979	California State University, Dominguez Hills	Carson, California	Active	
**Nu Omega**	September 1979	Immaculata University	East Whiteland Township, Pennsylvania	Active	
Xi Alpha	1978–xxxx ?	University of Albuquerque	Albuquerque, New Mexico	Inactive	(Note: The university closed in 1986.)
**Xi Beta**	19xx ?	Hillsdale College	Hillsdale, Michigan	Active	
**Xi Gamma**	April 1980	Evangel University	Springfield, Missouri	Active	
**Xi Delta**	April 22, 1980	St. Bonaventure University	St. Bonaventure, New York	Active	
Xi Epsilon	1980–xxxx ?	Texas Woman's University	Denton, Texas	Inactive	
**Xi Zeta**	1989	Albright College	Reading, Pennsylvania	Active	
Xi Eta	1980–xxxx ?	Saint Mary-of-the-Woods College	Saint Mary-of-the-Woods, Indiana	Inactive	
**Xi Theta**	1980	Mount St. Mary's University	Emmitsburg, Maryland	Active	
**Xi Iota**	1980	Radford University	Radford, Virginia	Active	
Xi Kappa	1981–xxxx ?	Susquehanna University	Selinsgrove, Pennsylvania	Inactive	
Xi Lambda	1981–xxxx ?	Ouachita Baptist University	Arkadelphia, Arkansas	Inactive	
Xi Mu	1981–xxxx ?	Calvin College	Grand Rapids, Michigan	Inactive	
Xi Nu	April 14, 1981	Whitman College	Walla Walla, Washington	Inactive	
Xi Xi	1981–xxxx ?	Morgan State University	Baltimore, Maryland	Active	
**Xi Omicron**	1981	North Carolina State University	Raleigh, North Carolina	Active	
Xi Pi	November 5, 1981	University of California, Santa Barbara	Santa Barbara, California	Inactive	
Xi Rho	198x ?–xxxx ?; 2005–2015	University of Texas–Pan American	Edinburg, Texas	Consolidated	(Note: UT Brownsville merged with UT–Pan American in 2015, to form The University of Texas Rio Grande Valley.)
Xi Sigma	198x ?–xxxx ?	East Central University	Ada, Oklahoma	Inactive	
**Xi Tau**	198x ?	University of California, Irvine	Irvine, California	Active	
**Xi Upsilon**	198x ?	Our Lady of the Lake University	San Antonio, Texas	Active	
Xi Phi	April 15, 1982 – xxxx ?	University of Nebraska at Kearney	Kearney, Nebraska	Inactive	
**Xi Chi**	1982	Keene State College	Keene, New Hampshire	Active	
**Xi Psi**	198x ?	Heidelberg University	Tiffin, Ohio	Active	
**Xi Omega**	198x ?	State University of New York at Potsdam	Potsdam, New York	Active	
**Omicron Alpha**	198x ?	Pepperdine University	Los Angeles County, California	Active	
**Omicron Beta**	198x ?	Morehouse College	Atlanta, Georgia	Active	
**Omicron Gamma**	198x ?	Drew University	Madison, New Jersey	Active	
**Omicron Delta**	February 3, 1983	Adrian College	Adrian, Michigan	Active	
**Omicron Epsilon**	1983	College of the Holy Cross	Worcester, Massachusetts	Active	
**Omicron Zeta**	February 1, 1983	University of Texas at San Antonio	San Antonio, Texas	Active	
**Omicron Eta**	1983	Delta State University	Cleveland, Mississippi	Active	
**Omicron Theta**	1983	California State University, Bakersfield	Bakersfield, California	Active	
**Omicron Iota**	1983	Salisbury University	Salisbury, Maryland	Active	
**Omicron Kappa**	1983	Virginia Military Institute	Lexington, Virginia	Active	
**Omicron Lambda**	April 30, 1983	University of Nebraska Omaha	Omaha, Nebraska	Active	
**Omicron Mu**	198x ?	University of Alabama at Birmingham	Birmingham, Alabama	Active	
Omicron Nu	1984–xxxx ?	Rollins College	Winter Park, Florida	Inactive	
**Omicron Xi**	March 1, 1984	University of La Verne	La Verne, California	Active	
Omicron Omicron	1984–xxxx ?	Berea College	Berea, Kentucky	Inactive	
Omicron Pi	April 14, 1984	Erskine College	Due West, South Carolina	Inactive	
**Omicron Rho**	1984	Saint Anselm College	Goffstown, New Hampshire	Active	
**Omicron Sigma**	May 24, 1984	Berry College	Mount Berry, Georgia	Active	
Omicron Tau	1984–xxxx ?	University of Massachusetts Boston	Boston, Massachusetts	Inactive	
Omicron Upsilon	1984	University of Wisconsin–Green Bay	Green Bay, Wisconsin	Inactive	
**Omicron Phi**	1984	Saint Joseph's University	Philadelphia, Pennsylvania	Active	
Omicron Chi	198x ?–xxxx ?	Rosemont College	Rosemont, Pennsylvania	Inactive	
Omicron Psi	198x ?–xxxx ?	University of Missouri–St. Louis	St. Louis, Missouri	Inactive	
Omicron Omega	198x ?–xxxx ?	Eastern University	St. Davids, Pennsylvania	Inactive	
Pi Alpha	198x ?–xxxx ?	St. Mary's College of Maryland	St. Mary's City, Maryland	Inactive	
Pi Beta	April 12, 1985	La Salle University	Philadelphia, Pennsylvania	Inactive	
**Pi Gamma**	1985	St. Cloud State University	St. Cloud, Minnesota	Active	
Pi Delta	1985–xxxx ?	University of Missouri–Kansas City	Kansas City, Missouri	Inactive	
**Pi Epsilon**	1985	Meredith College	Raleigh, North Carolina	Active	
**Pi Zeta**	1985	University of Northern Colorado	Greeley, Colorado	Active	
Pi Eta	1985–xxxx ?	Humboldt State University	Arcata, California	Inactive	
Pi Theta	1985–xxxx ?	Arkansas State University	Jonesboro, Arkansas	Inactive	
**Pi Iota**	1985	University of Tulsa	Tulsa, Oklahoma	Active	
Pi Kappa	1985–xxxx ?	University of New Orleans	New Orleans, Louisiana	Inactive	
**Pi Lambda**	1985	John Carroll University	University Heights, Ohio	Active	
**Pi Mu**	1985	North Park University	Chicago, Illinois	Active	
**Pi Nu**	June 6, 1985	Austin Peay State University	Clarksville, Tennessee	Active	
**Pi Xi**	198x ?–xxxx ?, 20xx ?	West Chester University	West Chester, Pennsylvania	Active	
**Pi Omicron**	198x ?	Middle Tennessee State University	Murfreesboro, Tennessee	Active	
Pi Pi					
**Pi Rho / Tau of Ohio**	June 17, 1986	Ohio University	Athens, Ohio	Active	
**Pi Sigma**	198x ?	University of Tampa	Tampa, Florida	Active	
Pi Tau	198x ?–xxxx ?	Ashland College	Ashland, Ohio	Inactive	
**Pi Upsilon**	198x ?	Wellesley College	Wellesley, Massachusetts	Active	
**Pi Phi**	March 4, 1987	Longwood University	Farmville, Virginia	Active	
**Pi Chi**	1987–xxxx ?; October 6, 2005	Liberty University	Lynchburg, Virginia	Active	
**Pi Psi**	1987	Virginia Commonwealth University	Richmond, Virginia	Active	
Pi Omega	1987–xxxx ?	Siena Heights College	Adrian, Michigan	Inactive	
**Rho Alpha**	1987	Morehead State University	Morehead, Kentucky	Active	
Rho Beta	1987–xxxx ?	Skidmore College	Saratoga Springs, New York	Inactive	
Rho Gamma	1987–xxxx ?	Colorado College	Colorado Springs, Colorado	Inactive	
Rho Delta	1987–xxxx ?	Westfield State University	Westfield, Massachusetts	Inactive	
**Rho Epsilon**	1987	Macalester College	Saint Paul, Minnesota	Active	
**Rho Zeta**	1987	State University of New York at New Paltz	New Paltz, New York	Active	
**Rho Eta**	1988	Elon University	Elon, North Carolina	Active	
**Rho Theta**	1988	Loyola University Maryland	Baltimore, Maryland	Active	
**Rho Iota**	1988	Franklin & Marshall College	Lancaster, Pennsylvania	Active	
**Rho Kappa**	May 3, 1988	Furman University	Greenville, South Carolina	Active	
**Rho Lambda**	April 22, 1988	University of North Carolina Wilmington	Wilmington, North Carolina	Active	
**Rho Mu**	198x ?	University of Nebraska–Lincoln	Lincoln, Nebraska	Active	
**Rho Nu**	198x ?	Binghamton University	Vestal, New York	Active	
**Rho Xi**	1989	South Dakota State University	Brookings, South Dakota	Active	
**Rho Omicron**	1989	Florida Atlantic University	Boca Raton, Florida	Active	
**Rho Pi**	1989	Villanova University	Villanova, Pennsylvania	Active	
**Rho Rho**	April 24, 1989	Truman State University	Kirksville, Missouri	Active	
**Rho Sigma**	1989	University of North Carolina at Charlotte	Charlotte, North Carolina	Active	
Rho Tau	1989–xxxx ?	Lake Erie College	Painesville, Ohio	Inactive	
Rho Upsilon	May 12, 1989	Xavier University	Cincinnati, Ohio	Inactive	
Rho Phi	1989	Brown University	Providence, Rhode Island	Inactive	
Rho Chi	19xx ?–xxxx ?	University of California, Davis	Davis, California	Inactive	
**Rho Psi**	19xx ?	University of Illinois Chicago	Chicago, Illinois	Active	
**Rho Omega**	May 14, 1990	Sweet Briar College	Amherst County, Virginia	Active	
Sigma Alpha	199x ?–xxxx ?	Emory University	Atlanta, Georgia	Inactive	
**Sigma Beta**	199x ?	Virginia Wesleyan University	Virginia Beach, Virginia	Active	
**Sigma Gamma**	199x ?	University of Richmond	Richmond, Virginia	Active	
Sigma Delta	199x ?–xxxx ?	College of Saint Rose	Albany, New York	Inactive	
**Sigma Epsilon**	1991	Indiana University Indianapolis	Indianapolis, Indiana	Active	
**Sigma Zeta**	March 29, 1990	Washington College	Chestertown, Maryland	Active	
**Sigma Eta**	1991	Southern Illinois University Carbondale	Carbondale, Illinois	Active	
**Sigma Theta**	1991	Randolph–Macon College	Ashland, Virginia	Active	
**Sigma Iota**	1991	Arcadia University	Glenside, Pennsylvania	Active	
Sigma Kappa	199x ?–xxxx ?	Wayne State College	Wayne, Nebraska	Inactive	
**Sigma Lambda**	199x ?	Mundelein College	Chicago, Illinois	Active	
Sigma Mu	199x ?–xxxx ?	Armstrong State University	Savannah, Georgia	Inactive	(Note: The university merged with Georgia Southern University in January 2018.)
**Sigma Nu**	1992–xxxx ?, 2006	Wilmington College	Wilmington, Ohio	Active	
**Sigma Xi**	199x ?	Grand Valley State University	Allendale, Michigan	Active	
**Sigma Omicron**	199x ?	University of Colorado Denver	Denver, Colorado	Active	
Sigma Pi	199x ?–xxxx ?	College of Saint Benedict and Saint John's University	St. Joseph and Collegeville Township, Minnesota	Inactive	
**Sigma Rho**	1992	University of the Cumberlands	Williamsburg, Kentucky	Active	
Sigma Sigma	1992–xxxx ?	Sul Ross State University	Alpine, Texas	Inactive	
**Sigma Tau**	1992	McNeese State University	Lake Charles, Louisiana	Active	
**Sigma Upsilon**	1992	Troy University	Troy, Alabama	Active	
**Sigma Phi**	1992	Lafayette College	Easton, Pennsylvania	Active	
**Sigma Chi**	1992	Agnes Scott College	Decatur, Georgia	Active	
**Sigma Psi**	1992	Iowa State University	Ames, Iowa	Active	
Sigma Omega	1992–xxxx ?	William Jewell College	Liberty, Missouri	Inactive	
Tau Alpha	1992–xxxx ?	University of Puget Sound	Tacoma, Washington	Inactive	
**Tau Beta**	1992	Castleton University	Castleton, Vermont	Active	
Tau Gamma					
**Tau Delta**	1992	University of Central Florida	Orlando, Florida	Active	
**Tau Epsilon**	1992	Northeastern State University	Tahlequah, Oklahoma	Active	
**Tau Zeta**	1992	State University of New York at Geneseo	Geneseo, New York	Active	
Tau Eta	199x ?	Utah State University	Logan, Utah	Inactive	
**Tau Theta**	199x ?	Kennesaw State University	Cobb County, Georgia	Active	
**Tau Iota**	January 26, 1993	The Citadel	Charleston, South Carolina	Active	
**Tau Kappa**	199x ?	Sonoma State University	Rohnert Park, California	Active	
**Tau Lambda**	199x ?	Wake Forest University	Winston-Salem, North Carolina	Active	
**Tau Mu**	199x ?	Union College	Schenectady, New York	Active	
**Tau Nu**	November 14, 1994	Charleston Southern University	North Charleston, South Carolina	Active	
**Tau Xi**	1994	Westmont College	Montecito, California	Active	
**Tau Omicron**	1994–xxxx ?; 20xx ?	Cornell College	Mount Vernon, Iowa	Active	
**Tau Pi**	199x ?	Howard Payne University	Brownwood, Texas	Active	
Tau Rho	199x ?–xxxx ?	University of North Dakota	Grand Forks, North Dakota	Inactive	
Tau Sigma	199x ?–xxxx ?	Eastern Oregon State College	La Grande, Oregon	Inactive	
**Tau Tau**	December 4, 1995	New Jersey City University	Jersey City, New Jersey	Active	
**Tau Upsilon**	April 1, 1996	DePauw University	Greencastle, Indiana	Active	
**Tau Phi**	December 1, 1996	Shippensburg University of Pennsylvania	Shippensburg, Pennsylvania	Active	
Tau Chi	1996–xxxx ?; November 2014–2015	University of Texas at Brownsville	Brownsville, Texas	Consolidated	(Note: After going dormant, the chapter was reformed by absorbing the Spanish Club (local), established in the spring of 2012.)
**Tau Psi**	December 1, 1996	Greensboro College	Greensboro, North Carolina	Active	
**Tau Omega**	April 1, 1997	Gardner–Webb University	Boiling Springs, North Carolina	Active	
**Upsilon Alpha**	April 26, 1997	Rockhurst University	Kansas City, Missouri	Active	
**Upsilon Beta**	April 1, 1997	William Peace University	Raleigh, North Carolina	Active	
**Upsilon Gamma**	May 1, 1997	North Carolina A&T State University	Greensboro, North Carolina	Active	
Upsilon Delta	May 1, 1997– xxxx ?	Rose–Hulman Institute of Technology	Terre Haute, Indiana	Inactive	
**Upsilon Epsilon**	1998	Quinnipiac University	Hamden, Connecticut	Active	
**Upsilon Zeta**	April 1, 1998	Colorado State University Pueblo	Pueblo, Colorado	Active	
**Upsilon Eta**	April 1, 1998	Hollins University	Hollins, Virginia	Active	
**Upsilon Theta**	April 1, 1998	Fayetteville State University	Fayetteville, North Carolina	Active	
Upsilon Iota	March 25, 1999	Alma College	Alma, Michigan	Inactive	
Upsilon Kappa	March 23, 1999– xxxx ?	Chadron State College	Chadron, Nebraska	Inactive	
**Upsilon Lambda**	March 28, 1999	University of Virginia's College at Wise	Wise, Virginia	Active	
**Upsilon Mu**	March 29, 1999	Case Western Reserve University	Cleveland, Ohio	Active	
Upsilon Nu	May 21, 1999– xxxx ?	Southern Connecticut State University	New Haven, Connecticut	Inactive	
**Upsilon Xi**	April 20, 2000	Tarleton State University	Stephenville, Texas	Active	
Upsilon Omicron	May 3, 2000– xxxx ?	Augustana University	Sioux Falls, South Dakota	Inactive	
**Upsilon Pi**	May 19, 2000	Whittier College	Whittier, California	Active	
**Upsilon Rho**	December 2, 2000	Illinois Wesleyan University	Bloomington, Illinois	Active	
**Upsilon Sigma**	December 11, 2000	Minnesota State University Moorhead	Moorhead, Minnesota	Active	
**Upsilon Tau**	March 27, 2001	University of Notre Dame	Notre Dame, Indiana	Active	
**Upsilon Upsilon**	April 5, 2001	California Lutheran University	Thousand Oaks, California	Active	
**Upsilon Phi**	April 21, 2001	Indiana University Southeast	New Albany, Indiana	Active	
**Alpha of Wyoming**	April 27, 2001	University of Wyoming	Laramie, Wyoming	Active	
**Upsilon Chi**	2001	Kutztown University of Pennsylvania	Kutztown, Pennsylvania	Active	
**Upsilon Psi**	December 2, 2001	The College of New Jersey	Ewing Township, New Jersey	Active	
**Upsilon Omega**	April 11, 2002	University of North Georgia	Dahlonega, Georgia	Active	
**Phi Alpha**	December 12, 2001	Northern Michigan University	Marquette, Michigan	Active	
**Phi Beta**	February 28, 2002	Luther College	Decorah, Iowa	Active	
**Phi Gamma**	May 14, 2002	California State University, Fullerton	Fullerton, California	Active	
**Phi Delta**	May 3, 2002	St. Joseph's University	Brooklyn and Long Island, New York	Active	
**Phi Epsilon**	March 23, 2003	Lyon College	Batesville, Arkansas	Active	
**Phi Zeta**	January 20, 2003	Hendrix College	Conway, Arkansas	Active	
**Phi Eta**	April 21, 2003	William Paterson University	Wayne, New Jersey	Active	
**Phi Theta**	February 27, 2003	University of St. Thomas	Saint Paul, Minnesota	Active	
**Phi Iota**	April 25, 2003	Southern Utah University	Cedar City, Utah	Active	
**Phi Kappa**	April 22, 2003	Southeastern Oklahoma State University	Durant, Oklahoma	Active	
**Phi Lambda**	April 10, 2003	Columbus State University	Columbus, Georgia	Active	
**Phi Mu**	April 23, 2003	State University of New York at Old Westbury	Old Westbury, New York	Active	
**Phi Nu**	October 24, 2003	Idaho State University	Pocatello, Idaho	Active	
Phi Xi	November 14, 2003–20xx ?	Texas A&M International University	Laredo, Texas	Inactive	
**Phi Omicron**	March 19, 2004	Azusa Pacific University	Azusa, California	Active	
**Phi Pi**	February 22, 2004	Marist University	Poughkeepsie, New York	Active	
**Phi Rho**	April 27, 2004	Assumption University	Worcester, Massachusetts	Active	
**Phi Sigma**	200x ?	University of Central Arkansas	Conway, Arkansas	Active	
**Phi Tau**	March 31, 2005	Millikin University	Decatur, Illinois	Active	
**Phi Upsilon**	March 1, 2005	Rhodes College	Memphis, Tennessee	Active	
**Phi Phi**	April 28, 2005	University of Vermont	Burlington, Vermont	Active	
**Phi Chi**	April 28, 2005	California State University, Long Beach	Long Beach, California	Active	
**Phi Psi**	November 8, 2005	Johns Hopkins University	Baltimore, Maryland	Active	
**Phi Omega**	April 23, 2005	Doane University	Crete, Nebraska	Active	
**Chi Alpha**	April 12, 2005	Wartburg College	Waverly, Iowa	Active	
**Chi Beta**	September 29, 2005	Randolph College	Lynchburg, Virginia	Active	
**Chi Gamma**	November 9, 2005	Stockton University	Galloway Township, New Jersey	Active	
**Chi Delta**	November 17, 2005	Brigham Young University–Idaho	Rexburg, Idaho	Active	
**Chi Epsilon**	April 24, 2006	Rutgers University–Newark	Newark, New Jersey	Active	
**Chi Zeta**	February 24, 2006	Western Connecticut State University	Danbury, Connecticut	Active	
**Chi Eta**	April 8, 2006	West Liberty University	West Liberty, West Virginia	Active	
**Chi Theta**	April 6, 2006	Francis Marion University	Florence, South Carolina	Active	
**Chi Iota**	April 25, 2006	Indiana Wesleyan University	Marion, Indiana	Active	
**Chi Kappa**	April 24, 2006	Bentley University	Waltham, Massachusetts	Active	
**Chi Lambda**	May 15, 2006	Florida A&M University	Tallahassee, Florida	Active	
**Chi Mu**	May 25, 2006	Kean University	Union Township, New Jersey	Active	
**Chi Nu**	October 19, 2006	Lakeland University	Sheboygan, Wisconsin	Active	
**Chi Xi**	December 2, 2006	Roosevelt University	Chicago, Illinois	Active	
**Chi Omicron**	November 9, 2006	Lander University	Greenwood, South Carolina	Active	
**Chi Pi**	March 24, 2007	Winona State University	Winona, Minnesota	Active	
**Chi Rho**	March 20, 2007	Eastern Michigan University	Ypsilanti, Michigan	Active	
**Chi Sigma**	April 12, 2007	Indiana University Northwest	Gary, Indiana	Active	
**Chi Tau**	October 25, 2007	Canisius University	Buffalo, New York	Active	
**Chi Upsilon**	May 2, 2007	Ramapo College	Mahwah, New Jersey	Active	
**Chi Phi**	April 8, 2008	St. Ambrose University	Davenport, Iowa	Active	
**Chi Chi**	March 28, 2008	Roger Williams University	Bristol, Rhode Island	Active	
**Chi Psi**	April 5, 2008	Hawaii Pacific University	Honolulu, Hawaii	Active	
**Chi Omega**	April 24, 2008	Olivet Nazarene University	Bourbonnais, Illinois	Active	
**Psi Alpha**	May 5, 2008	Clark Atlanta University	Atlanta, Georgia	Active	
**Psi Beta**	October 1, 2008	Campbell University	Buies Creek, North Carolina	Active	
**Psi Gamma**	September 19, 2008	Dallas Baptist University	Dallas, Texas	Active	
**Psi Delta**	December 2, 2008	University of Arkansas–Fort Smith	Fort Smith, Arkansas	Active	
**Psi Epsilon**	December 5, 2008	California State University, San Marcos	San Marcos, California	Active	
**Psi Zeta**	December 4, 2008	Southwestern Oklahoma State University	Weatherford, Oklahoma	Active	
**Psi Eta**	February 18, 2009	Presbyterian College	Clinton, South Carolina	Active	
**Psi Theta**	April 10, 2009	Lincoln University	Jefferson City, Missouri	Active	
**Psi Iota**	April 15, 2009	North Greenville University	Tigerville, South Carolina	Active	
**Psi Kappa**	April 29, 2009	Pomona College	Claremont, California	Active	
**Psi Lambda**	May 6, 2009	Shepherd University	Shepherdstown, West Virginia	Active	
**Psi Mu**	April 15, 2009	Aurora University	Aurora, Illinois	Active	
**Psi Nu**	April 23, 2009	Coppin State University	Baltimore, Maryland	Active	
**Psi Xi**	April 28, 2009	Creighton University	Omaha, Nebraska	Active	
**Psi Omicron**	September 16, 2009	Arkansas Tech University	Russellville, Arkansas	Active	
**Psi Pi**	October 14, 2009	North Central College	Naperville, Illinois	Active	
**Psi Rho**	April 23, 2010	Purdue University Northwest	Hammond, Indiana	Active	(Note: Chapter formed at Purdue University Calumet, now called Purdue University Northwest.)
**Psi Sigma**	January 22, 2010	Northwestern Oklahoma State University	Alva, Oklahoma	Active	
**Psi Tau**	April 18, 2010	Methodist University	Fayetteville, North Carolina	Active	
**Psi Upsilon**	2010	Reinhardt University	Waleska, Georgia	Active	
**Psi Phi**	April 20, 2010	Christopher Newport University	Newport News, Virginia	Active	
**Psi Chi**	May 4, 2010	University of Houston–Downtown	Houston, Texas	Active	
**Psi Psi**	April 23, 2010	Westminster College	Fulton, Missouri	Active	
**Psi Omega**	April 28, 2010	Nebraska Wesleyan University	Lincoln, Nebraska	Active	
**Omega Alpha**	May 5, 2010	Weber State University	Ogden, Utah	Active	
**Omega Beta**	May 14, 2010	Fairleigh Dickinson University	Madison, New Jersey	Active	
**Omega Gamma**	October 22, 2010	Abilene Christian University	Abilene, Texas	Active	
**Omega Delta**	March 19, 2011	Blackburn College	Carlinville, Illinois	Active	
**Omega Epsilon**	April 8, 2011	Queens University of Charlotte	Charlotte, North Carolina	Active	
**Omega Zeta**	April 1, 2011	Florida International University	Westchester, Florida	Active	
**Omega Eta**	April 26, 2011	Gettysburg College	Gettysburg, Pennsylvania	Active	
**Omega Theta**	April 15, 2011	Pace University Pleasantville–Briarcliff Campus	Briarcliff Manor, New York	Active	
**Omega Iota**	November 17, 2011	South Carolina State University	Orangeburg, South Carolina	Active	
**Omega Kappa**	February 26, 2012	Saginaw Valley State University	University Center, Michigan	Active	
**Omega Lambda**	April 20, 2012	Suffolk University	Boston, Massachusetts	Active	
**Omega Mu**	November 14, 2012	Campbellsville University	Campbellsville, Kentucky	Active	
**Omega Nu**	November 26, 2012	Buena Vista University	Storm Lake, Iowa	Active	
**Omega Xi**	April 6, 2013	Western Washington University	Bellingham, Washington	Active	
**Omega Omicron**	April 12, 2013	University of Minnesota Morris	Morris, Minnesota	Active	
**Omega Pi**	April 8, 2013	Flagler College	St. Augustine, Florida	Active	
**Omega Rho**	April 15, 2013	University of Michigan–Dearborn	Dearborn, Michigan	Active	
**Omega Sigma**	April 30, 2013	United States Air Force Academy	El Paso County, Colorado	Active	
**Omega Tau**	May 2, 2013	University of Colorado Colorado Springs	Colorado Springs, Colorado	Active	
**Omega Upsilon**	September 17, 2013	Indiana University Kokomo	Kokomo, Indiana	Active	
**Omega Phi**	November 7, 2013	California Baptist University	Riverside, California	Active	
**Omega Chi**	May 2, 2014	East Carolina University	Greenville, North Carolina	Active	
**Omega Psi**	November 20, 2014	Wilkes University	Wilkes-Barre, Pennsylvania	Active	
**Omega Omega**	April 25, 2014	Duquesne University	Pittsburgh, Pennsylvania	Active	
**Alpha Alpha Alpha**	November 14, 2014	University of North Florida	Jacksonville, Florida	Active	
**Alpha Alpha Beta**	November 22, 2014	University of California, Merced	Merced, California	Active	
**Alpha Alpha Gamma**	April 3, 2015	Southern Virginia University	Buena Vista, Virginia	Active	
**Alpha Alpha Delta**	May 15, 2015	College of Staten Island	Staten Island, New York	Active	
**Alpha Alpha Epsilon**	April 23, 2015	Southern Illinois University Edwardsville	Edwardsville, Illinois	Active	
**Alpha Alpha Zeta**	May 15, 2015	Metropolitan State University of Denver	Denver, Colorado	Active	
**Alpha Alpha Eta**	May 13, 2015	Mount Saint Mary College	Newburgh, New York	Active	
**Alpha Alpha Theta**	May 15, 2015	Biola University	La Mirada, California	Active	
**Alpha Alpha Iota**	August 31, 2015	University of Texas Rio Grande Valley	Edinburg, Texas	Active	
**Alpha Alpha Kappa**	October 19, 2015	John Jay College of Criminal Justice	New York City, New York	Active	
**Alpha Alpha Lambda**	November 12, 2015	Western Illinois University	Macomb, Illinois	Active	
**Alpha Alpha Mu**	February 8, 2016	Norwich University	Northfield, Vermont	Active	
**Alpha Alpha Nu**	April 13, 2016	Shenandoah University	Winchester, Virginia	Active	
**Alpha Alpha Xi**	April 9, 2016	University of Sioux Falls	Sioux Falls, South Dakota	Active	
**Alpha Alpha Omicron**	May 20, 2016	California State University, Channel Islands	Ventura County, California	Active	
**Alpha Alpha Pi**	May 2, 2016	University of Maine at Farmington	Farmington, Maine	Active	
**Alpha Alpha Rho**	May 1, 2017	Morningside University	Sioux City, Iowa	Active	
**Alpha Alpha Sigma**	May 18, 2017	Merrimack College	North Andover, Massachusetts	Active	
**Alpha Alpha Tau**	November 2, 2017	Wheaton College	Wheaton, Illinois	Active	
**Alpha Alpha Upsilon**	October 16, 2017	Anderson University	Anderson, South Carolina	Active	
**Alpha Alpha Phi**	December 8, 2017	Indiana University Bloomington	Bloomington, Indiana	Active	
**Alpha Alpha Chi**	March 28, 2018	Marian University	Indianapolis, Indiana	Active	
**Alpha Alpha Psi**	April 9, 2018	Penn State Berks	Spring Township, Pennsylvania	Active	
**Alpha Alpha Omega**	April 13, 2019	Kalamazoo College	Kalamazoo, Michigan	Active	
**Alpha Beta Alpha**	April 15, 2019	University of North Alabama	Florence, Alabama	Active	
**Alpha Beta Beta**	March 28, 2019	Yale University	New Haven, Connecticut	Active	
**Alpha Beta Gamma**	April 5, 2019	Northeastern University	Boston, Massachusetts	Active	
**Alpha Beta Delta**	April 22, 2019	Virginia State University	Ettrick, Virginia	Active	
**Alpha Beta Epsilon**	April 24, 2019	Utah Tech University	St. George, Utah	Active	
**Alpha Beta Zeta**	April 23, 2019	University of North Texas at Dallas	Dallas, Texas	Active	
**Alpha Beta Eta**	May 5, 2019	Coe College	Cedar Rapids, Iowa	Active	
**Alpha Beta Theta**	May 9, 2019	Oakwood University	Huntsville, Alabama	Active	
**Alpha Beta Iota**	December 12, 2019	Pennsylvania State University		Active	
**Alpha Beta Kappa**	May 7, 2020	Missouri Southern State University	Joplin, Missouri	Active	
**Alpha Beta Lambda**	2021	New Mexico Highlands University	Las Vegas, New Mexico	Active	
**Alpha Beta Mu**	December 18, 2021	University of Wisconsin–Parkside	Kenosha, Wisconsin	Active	
**Alpha Beta Nu**	April 14, 2022	Trine University	Angola, Indiana	Active	
**Alpha Beta Xi**	April 26, 2022	Southwest Baptist University	Bolivar, Missouri	Active	
**Alpha Beta Omicron**	April 19, 2022	Lewis University	Romeoville, Illinois	Active	
**Alpha Beta Pi**	November 29, 2022	College of Idaho	Caldwell, Idaho	Active	
**Alpha Beta Rho**	December 2, 2022	University of Texas at Dallas	Richardson, Texas	Active	
Alpha Beta Sigma	November 16, 2022	Coastal Carolina University	Conway, South Carolina	Active	
Alpha Beta Tau	April 13, 2023	Simmons University	Boston, Massachusetts	Active	
**Alpha Beta Upsilon**	May 2, 2024	Fairmont State University	Fairmont, West Virginia	Active	
**Alpha Beta Phi**	March 18, 2025	Saint Francis University	Loretto, Pennsylvania	Active	
**Alpha Beta Chi**	May 5, 2025	Wabash College	Crawfordsville, Indiana	Active	
**Alpha Beta Psi**	May 8, 2025	Texas Tech University Health Sciences Center El Paso	El Paso, Texas	Active	
**Kappa of Tennessee**		Sewanee: The University of the South	Sewanee, Tennessee	Active	
		Indiana University–Purdue University Fort Wayne	Fort Wayne, Indiana	Inactive	(Note: IPFW split into Indiana University Fort Wayne and Purdue University Fort Wayne on July 1, 2018.)
		Mountain State University	Beckley, West Virginia	Inactive	(Note: The college closed in 2013.)
		Ohio State University at Lima	Lima, Ohio	Inactive	
		St. John's University	Queens, New York City, New York	Inactive	
