= Wartell =

Wartell is a surname. Notable people with the surname include:

- Michael A. Wartell (born 1946), American academic administrator
- Roger Wartell (fl. from 1966), American academic
- Sarah Rosen Wartell (fl. from 1993), American non-profit executive

== See also ==
- Wartelle
