= Purdue University system =

Public university system in Indiana

- Type: Public university system
- Established: May 6, 1869; 157 years ago
- Founder: John Purdue
- Accreditation: HLC
- Endowment: $4.1 billion (system-wide) (2024)
- President: Mitch Daniels (interim)
- Faculty: 8,733 system-wide
- Students: 118,686 system-wide
- Undergraduates: 96,422 system-wide
- Postgraduates: 22,264 system-wide
- Location: West Lafayette; Indianapolis; Fort Wayne; Hammond; Westville
- Campus: 18,676 acres (7,558 ha) among five campuses
- Colors: Old Gold and Black
- Website: purdue.edu/home/about/systemwide-campuses/

Purdue University campus locations

The Purdue University system is a public university system in the U.S. state of Indiana. A land-grant university with nearly 75,000 students across three institutions comprising five physical campuses, a statewide technology program, extension centers in each of Indiana's 92 counties, and continuing education programs. Additionally, there are another ~44,000 students enrolled in an online university. Each university in the system maintains its own faculty and admissions policies which are overseen by the Purdue University Board of Trustees. Purdue's main campus in West Lafayette is the best-known, noted for its highly regarded programs in engineering and adjacent subjects.

== Traditional campuses ==
The Purdue University system consists of one core university with two campus locations, plus two regional universities, one of which also has two campus locations. It formerly included three collaborative universities in a partnership with the Indiana University system (at Indianapolis, Fort Wayne, and Columbus).

=== Purdue University, West Lafayette ===
The system's main, most well-known, and largest university is located in West Lafayette, Indiana, on the banks of the Wabash River. The main university acts as an anchor for the entire university system, and is where system-wide administrative buildings are located.

=== Purdue University, Indianapolis ===
An expansion of the West Lafayette campus, Purdue University in Indianapolis was launched on July 1, 2024, following the split of Indiana University–Purdue University Indianapolis. The university has a 28-acre (11 ha) footprint in downtown Indianapolis, which includes space in the existing engineering and technology buildings, and has established partnerships with companies for facilities and shared spaces throughout the metro area.

=== Regional universities ===
The Purdue system independently operates two regional universities, Purdue University Northwest and Purdue University Fort Wayne.

==== Purdue Northwest ====
Established in 2016 from the merger of Purdue University Calumet and Purdue University North Central (both established in 1946), Purdue Northwest is composed of the two campuses of the former universities' locations (Hammond, IN and Westville, IN, respectively). Prior to their establishment as official universities, the campuses offered technical courses as part of the national defense training program with the federal government during World War II.

==== Purdue Fort Wayne ====
The newest Purdue system university, Purdue Fort Wayne (PFW) began operations on July 1, 2018, following the dissolution of Indiana University–Purdue University Fort Wayne (IPFW). The school had been a collaborative venture between Purdue University and Indiana University similar to that of IUPUI, but under the management and budgetary administration of the Purdue University system. IU and Purdue agreed to split IPFW's academic programs following many years of discussion, with all health science programs becoming part of the also then-new Indiana University Fort Wayne. This included IPFW's nursing program, which was formerly under Purdue administration. The rest of the academic programs (with the exception of the philosophy and geoscience departments, which were closed), along with the athletic program (the Fort Wayne Mastodons), fell under the auspices of the new PFW.

=== Former collaborative campuses ===
==== Indiana University–Purdue University Indianapolis ====
Indiana University–Purdue University Indianapolis (IUPUI) was established in 1969 as a merger of the IU and Purdue Indianapolis extension centers. IUPUI was integrated into the IU system budget but was semi-autonomous in that it retained some independent control of its own academic curricula. As a core campus of the Indiana University system, IUPUI was primarily governed by the Indiana University Board of Trustees. Purdue University degree-granting programs were governed by the Purdue University Board of Trustees.

On August 12, 2022, the boards of trustees of both Purdue and IU announced that IUPUI would split into two separate universities starting on July 1, 2024, with completion of the split to be finished by the fall 2024 semester. The Purdue administered programs, with the exception of most of the school of science, formed the foundation of the new Purdue University in Indianapolis, a fully-integrated expansion of Purdue West Lafayette. The IUPUI athletic program transferred to the IU campus, with a new athletic identity of IU Indy.

==== Indiana University–Purdue University Columbus ====
Indiana University–Purdue University Columbus was a regional campus of, and administered by, IUPUI that was established in 1970. After the split of IUPUI in 2024, Purdue no longer has involvement in the campus and it has been renamed Indiana University Columbus. Only one program, the B.S. in mechanical engineering, was accredited through the Purdue School of Engineering and Technology at IUPUI, and is now administered through the new Purdue University in Indianapolis.

==== Indiana University–Purdue University Fort Wayne ====
Indiana University–Purdue University Fort Wayne (IPFW) was a collaboration between IU and Purdue at Fort Wayne with a similar governmental structure to IUPUI, but under the administrative and budgetary control of the Purdue System. On July 1, 2018, the two universities parted, with the health sciences programs on the campus becoming Indiana University Fort Wayne, and the other programs becoming Purdue University Fort Wayne (PFW).

== Online programs ==
=== Purdue Global ===
Purdue University Global, (PG), formerly Kaplan University, is an adult-serving public university, operated as part of the Purdue system as a public benefit corporation, primarily online. The school's online program manager is Kaplan Higher Education, a division of Graham Holdings Company. As with other campuses in the system, PG has its own faculty, admissions policies, and curriculum but is overseen ultimately by the Purdue University Board of Trustees. Purdue Global offers certificates, and degrees at the associate's, bachelor's, master's, and doctoral level. Diplomas given by Purdue Global differ from other schools in the Purdue system and have a different name, font, and PG logo in place of the Seal of the Purdue University Board of Trustees. Purdue Global also includes Purdue Global Law School. In 2023, Forbes reported that Purdue Global owed Kaplan Higher Education $128 million and that it may not be able to repay its debt to the for-profit servicer.

=== Purdue Online ===
Purdue Online is the administrative unit charged with planning and enabling Purdue's effort to unify the online offerings by Purdue West Lafayette, Purdue Fort Wayne, Purdue Northwest, and Purdue Global. The initiative was approved by Purdue President Mitch Daniels and the Purdue Board of Trustees in December 2018. Purdue Online degrees are awarded as Purdue University degrees, as opposed to Purdue Global degrees.

== Purdue statewide ==
=== Technology centers ===
In addition to its main location in West Lafayette, the Purdue Polytechnic Institute, one of the 10 academic colleges at Purdue University, operates nine satellite locations across Indiana. Degree programs at each location are regionally determined by current and projected workforce needs within the region. These are located in Anderson, Columbus, Indianapolis, Kokomo, Lafayette, New Albany, Richmond, Vincennes, and South Bend. These locations offer certificate, associate, and/or bachelor's degrees, some of which are ABET-accredited technical degrees.

=== County cooperative extension offices ===
In conjunction with the state of Indiana, Purdue University operates a cooperative extension office in each of Indiana's 92 counties. Each office provides information and analysis for farmers, agricultural-industry employees, gardeners, naturalists, and homeowners. Cooperative Extension also includes youth development, family and consumer sciences, and community development.

== History ==
=== Founding of the main campus ===
The state of Indiana received a gift of $150,000 from John Purdue, a Lafayette business leader and philanthropist, along with $50,000 from Tippecanoe County, Indiana, and 150 acres (0.6 km^{2}) of land from Lafayette residents in support of the project. In 1869, it was decided that the college would be founded near the city of Lafayette and established as Purdue University, in the name of the institution's principal benefactor.

Classes first began at the Purdue main campus on September 16, 1874. Purdue issued its first degree, a Bachelor of Science in Chemistry, in 1875. Architecturally, buildings at the West Lafayette campus generally feature red brick.

=== Extension centers become degree-granting regional campuses ===
After the return of a large number of veterans at the close of World War II, Purdue University opened over forty extension centers throughout Indiana. Through these many extension centers Purdue University offered freshman-level classes for both the purpose of the convenience of students starting their college studies close to their residence before taking the more major step of transferring to the main campus in West Lafayette as well as the purpose of off-loading a substantial number of freshmen from residential and classroom resources that were in short supply on the main campus in order to handle the rapid major expansion in enrollment following the periods of smaller enrollment during both the Great Depression and World War II.

Of these over forty extension centers, five were retained over the multiple decades since WWII and transformed into institutions that grant degrees that require four or more years of study. Of these five, three of them—PFW, IUPUI, and Purdue Calumet (now part of Purdue Northwest)—are medium-sized residential, research universities that each grant 100 to 200 different degrees, majors, or programs across a wide diversity of areas of study. In fact, with enrollment approaching 30,000 students, IUPUI was more properly categorized as a large university in its own right that grants doctorate degrees as well as master's, bachelor's, and associate degrees, but at IUPUI the number of Indiana University programs and students were significantly larger than the number of Purdue University programs and students.

==== Purdue University Fort Wayne ====
Purdue University founded the Purdue Fort Wayne Extension Center downtown in the fall of 1941 to provide a site in Fort Wayne for students to begin their undergraduate studies prior to transferring to the West Lafayette main campus to complete their degree.

Under the direction of Purdue University president Frederick Hovde, Indiana University President Herman Wells, IU trustee John Hastings, and Purdue Trustee Alfred Kettler Sr., the Indiana University and Purdue University extension centers began merging in 1958. To serve the extension centers' combined mission in Fort Wayne, Fort Wayne's Indiana-Purdue Foundation purchased 216 acres (0.87 km^{2}) of farmland at the then-suburban northern edge of Fort Wayne.

The new Indiana University—Purdue University Fort Wayne (IPFW) campus opened on September 17, 1964, following nearly two years of construction that began on October 18, 1962. At the time of its dissolution in 2018, IPFW was a 520-acre (2.1 km^{2}) campus on both sides of the Saint Joseph River with 13 educational buildings, plus student residences and various other athletic facilities and parking structures. IPFW awarded its first four-year degree in 1968 after awarding two-year degrees through the IU Fort Wayne extension center prior to the formation of the joint IPFW campus. The joint campus was administered through Purdue University, although the medical programs and the library were administered through Indiana University. IPFW's degrees were awarded by either Purdue University or Indiana University on a program-by-program basis. IPFW's curriculum contained over 170 degrees, majors, or programs. Architecturally, IPFW buildings generally feature brown or tan brick as a variation on Purdue's main campus' red brick.

In December 2016, the governing boards of the IU and Purdue systems initially approved a plan to split IPFW into two separate institutions. Both boards gave their final approval to the split in June 2017. Effective July 1, 2018, IPFW's academic programs in health sciences were taken over by IU under the identity of Indiana University Fort Wayne (IUFW). All remaining academic programs moved to the Purdue system under the banner of Purdue University Fort Wayne (PFW). PFW continues to provide administrative services and general education classes for IUFW students. IPFW's athletic program completely transferred to Purdue Fort Wayne, and shortly before the split took effect, the athletic program renamed itself from Fort Wayne Mastodons to Purdue Fort Wayne Mastodons.

==== Purdue University Northwest ====
Purdue University Northwest was established in 2016 via the merger of two former Purdue regional campuses—Purdue University Calumet in Hammond and Purdue University North Central in Westville. Both predecessor institutions opened in 1946.

Calumet opened as a regional extension, with classes at various locations in the area. All Calumet operations were centralized at a new 50-acre (20 ha) campus in Hammond in 1951. The campus has remained at this location, but has since expanded to 194 acres (79 ha). In 1962, the Purdue system redefined Calumet as a full regional campus, and as a regional university in 1979. After years of offering only associate degrees, it awarded its first bachelor's degrees in spring 1967. Calumet became a residential campus with the 2005 opening of its first residence halls.

North Central was also established as a regional extension, initially offering classes in LaPorte and Michigan City. All classes were centralized in 1949, and the university purchased a 160-acre (65 ha) site in 1962 to begin the process of converting what was then known as the Barker Memorial Center to a full regional campus. The new campus opened in 1967, and has since been expanded to 305 acres (123 ha).

=== Former collaborative campuses ===
==== IUPUI ====
Purdue University founded the Purdue Indianapolis Extension Center downtown in the fall of 1946 to provide a site in Indianapolis for students to begin their undergraduate studies prior to transferring to the West Lafayette main campus to complete their degree.

In 1969, the Purdue University Indianapolis Extension Center merged into the Indiana University Indianapolis campus to form IUPUI. IUPUI awarded its first four-year undergraduate degree in 1970, having previously awarded graduate degrees in law and medicine for decades through the Indiana University Indianapolis campus.

IUPUI was administered through Indiana University. IUPUI's Purdue University programs were in two schools that are academically affiliated with Purdue University. IUPUI's degrees were awarded by either Purdue University or Indiana University on a program-by-program basis. IUPUI's curriculum contained over 550 degrees, majors, or programs. IUPUI was located on a 285-acre (1.15 km^{2}) campus west of downtown Indianapolis. The Purdue University programs at the Purdue Indianapolis Extension Center awarded their first two-year degrees in 1947.

The IUPUI split between Indiana University and Purdue became official in July 2024 when Purdue's new Indianapolis campus was launched. Instead of being a regional campus, the urban location is fully-integrated expansion of Purdue's West Lafayette campus.

==== IUPUC ====
Purdue University first opened their extension center in Columbus in the fall of 1942. IUPUI Columbus began operations on August 17, 1970, as an extension of IUPUI. The building which housed IUPUC was first occupied by IUPUI Columbus in 1974. The name of IUPUI Columbus was changed to IUPUC in 1994. IUPUC was administered through IUPUI. IUPUC's degrees were awarded by either Purdue University or Indiana University on a program-by-program basis. Because IUPUC granted only one master's degree, 15 bachelor's degrees, and 6 associate degrees, IUPUC was still in the early part of the transformation from feeder-campus status (where students were expected to transfer to the main campuses of IUPUI, Purdue University, or Indiana University Bloomington for completion of their degree) to full university status (where students could pursue at the same campus any one of a wide diversity of degrees, majors, or programs offered by any of multiple colleges or schools based at that campus).

On August 12, 2022, the boards of trustees of both Purdue and IU announced that IUPUI will split into two separate universities, with completion of the split becoming official on July 1, 2024. IUPUC was renamed IU Columbus and has continued to be a regional education center administered through IU Indianapolis following the split. Only the mechanical engineering program, which had been accredited through the Purdue School of Engineering and Technology at IUPUI, is now administered through the new Purdue University in Indianapolis.

==== IPFW ====
IPFW was a public university in Fort Wayne, Indiana. Founded in 1964, IPFW was a cooperatively managed regional campus of two state university systems: Indiana University and Purdue University. IPFW offered more than 200 graduate and undergraduate degree programs through IU or Purdue universities.

On July 1, 2018, the two universities parted company in Fort Wayne. The health sciences programs on the campus became Indiana University Fort Wayne, and the other programs became Purdue University Fort Wayne (PFW).

== Athletics ==
Two campuses of the Purdue University system sponsor NCAA Division I teams. The Purdue Boilermakers, representing the West Lafayette main campus, field 18 teams, including the system's only football team. The Boilermakers are members of the Big Ten Conference in the Football Bowl Subdivision. The Purdue Fort Wayne Mastodons field 14 teams, with all except the PFW men's volleyball team competing in the Horizon League - the PFW men's volleyball team competes in the Midwestern Intercollegiate Volleyball Association. The Purdue Northwest Pride fields 15 NCAA Division II teams, all of which compete in the Great Lakes Intercollegiate Athletic Conference.

Formerly, the IUPUI Jaguars fielded 14 teams, but their entire athletics program transitioned to IU Indianapolis, with an athletic brand name of IU Indy, following the IUPUI split in July 2024. The same is true for the IUPUC Crimson Pride, whose four teams started competition in the River States Conference of the National Association of Intercollegiate Athletics in the 2022–23 academic year. IUPUC added four more teams in 2023–24, its last academic year before the IUPUI split. After the split, the IUPUC athletic program transferred to IU Columbus.

== Administration ==
Purdue University is managed by a ten-member board of trustees all of whom are appointed by the governor of Indiana. Three of these trustees are Purdue graduates nominated by the alumni association, while another must be a current full-time student.

The university president is the chief executive officer of Purdue. Some campuses—with the exceptions of West Lafayette and the new Purdue University in Indianapolis—also have a chancellor. The powers of a chancellor at the West Lafayette campus are exercised by the president.
