= Mastodon Minutes =

- Created by: Josh VanCleave; Ryan Lower; Kourtney Bell
- Country of origin: United States

Production
- Running time: 8-15 minutes
- Production company: Mastodon Minutes Productions

Original release
- Network: College Access Television
- Release: January 2010 – April 2012

Mastodon Minutes was the weekly news program for Indiana University - Purdue University Fort Wayne and taped at the College Access Television Studios, Walter E. Helmke Library in Fort Wayne, Indiana.

== Overview ==
Mastodon Minutes originally was developed as a program that "strived to get IPFW students more involved on campus." The program's tone was informative and humorous with original anchors Kourtney Bell and Ryan Lower. Starting in season three, the program began to emphasize more in-depth news coverage of events at IPFW with a lesser emphasis on humor.

== See also ==
- The IPFW Communicator
- Indiana University - Purdue University Fort Wayne
