= Margaret Mary Vojtko =

American linguist, educator, polyglot, and labor unionist

- Born: Margaret Mary Paula Vojtko; January 15, 1930; Homestead, Pennsylvania, U.S.
- Died: September 1, 2013 (aged 83); Homestead, Pennsylvania, U.S.
- Citizenship: American
- Education: University of Pittsburgh; The Catholic University of America
- Scientific career
- Fields: French and medieval literature
- Workplaces: Duquesne University

Margaret Mary Vojtko (January 15, 1930 – September 1, 2013) was an American adjunct professor of French at Duquesne University. Her death caused controversy at Duquesne and prompted conversations about unions and the role of adjunct faculty at American universities.

== Early life and education ==
Margaret Mary Paula Vojtko was born on January 15, 1930, to Catholic Slovak parents. She had five older siblings. Her father worked at Homestead Steel Works, a large steel mill once owned by Andrew Carnegie. Her father belonged to a labor union that would later become the United Steelworkers. Her mother died when she was seven, and her older sister Anne helped raise her. Growing up, Margaret spoke mostly Slovak at home. She attended a high school run by the Vincentian Sisters of Charity and became a secretary at the University of Pittsburgh after graduation; at the time, she wanted to be a nun, although she later abandoned this plan. She remained a traditionalist Catholic throughout her life, however, and opposed the reforms of the Second Vatican Council.

After her father's death in 1957, Vojtko attended the University of Pittsburgh, earning a bachelor's degree in 1967 and a master's in 1970. In the mid-1970s, she began working on a doctoral degree from The Catholic University of America. She never completed her dissertation, which focused on the history of Homestead. She received a nursing degree in 1987.

== Career ==
Vojtko taught courses in French and medieval literature at Carnegie Mellon University and Indiana University – Purdue University Fort Wayne before being hired at Duquesne in 1988. She taught at Duquesne for 25 years as an adjunct faculty member. She voted with a majority of other liberal-arts adjunct faculty members to unionize under the purview of the United Steelworkers, who had also represented her father. Duquesne has not recognized the adjunct faculty members' union, arguing that the university's religious nature exempts it from the oversight of the National Labor Relations Board.

On April 2, 2013, Vojtko learned her teaching contract would not be renewed; she was instead offered a tutoring job that would have paid two thirds of what she made as an adjunct faculty member. Daniel Kovalik, an attorney for the United Steelworkers, was assisting Vojtko with a complaint to the Equal Employment Opportunity Commission that the university had not rehired her because of her age or disability. In addition to her work as an academic, Vojtko did translation work on a freelance basis, including in Slovak. She spoke five languages besides English, having majored in French and Italian as an undergraduate and having gained familiarity with German and Latin.

== Death ==
On August 16, 2013, Vojtko suffered a large heart attack; she died two weeks later, on September 1, aged 83. She had previously been receiving treatment for cancer, and a reaction to pills she had been prescribed had caused her to have an earlier heart attack the previous year.

=== Controversy ===
At the time of her death, she had recently become unemployed after Duquesne declined to extend her contract. Particular attention has been paid to the university's labor practices following her death. She was removed from campus by police and dismissed from her work after sleeping in her university office; she was unable to heat her home due to medical bills incurred through taking chemotherapy to treat her ovarian cancer; lack of pension benefits had forced her to continue working until the age of 83 on a full or nearly full-time basis. Vice President for University Advancement John Plante described reports that the university did nothing to help Ms. Vojtko as 'reckless' and 'mischaracterizations': "Our defense is the truth. Mr. Kovalik has tried to frame this as an issue of human resources policy, but he is wrong...The support provided and offered to Margaret Mary Vojtko was broad, involving the Spiritan community, student housing, EAP, campus police, facilities management, and her faculty and staff colleagues." Rev. Daniel Walsh, a university chaplain, described reports of Vojtko's death as attempts to promote an 'alternative agenda' and said that she was provided with emergency housing on campus for a few weeks.

=== Reaction ===
Kansas State University English professor Philip Nel was among those who faulted Duquesne for treating Vojtko unfairly, suggesting that the university's not providing her with health insurance contributed to her death. Representatives of the university defended their treatment of Vojtko, indicating that she had refused repeated offers of assistance from members of the university community. For a time, Vojtko lived in Laval House, a campus residence for priests. Her funeral mass was held at Epiphany Church in Pittsburgh.
