= Wartelle =

Wartelle is a surname. Notable people with the surname include:

- Julien Wartelle (1889–1943), French gymnast
- Paul Wartelle (1892–1974), French gymnast
- Philippe Wartelle (born 1969), French boxer

== See also ==
- Wartell
