= Purdue University Fort Wayne =

Public university in Fort Wayne, Indiana, US

- Type: Public university
- Established: July 1, 2018
- Parent institution: Purdue University system
- Accreditation: HLC
- Academic affiliations: CUMU; Space-grant
- Chancellor: Ronald L. Elsenbaumer
- Academic staff: 787 (Fall 2021)
- Students: 7,206 (Fall 2024)
- Undergraduates: 6,489 (Fall 2024)
- Postgraduates: 717 (Fall 2024)
- Location: Fort Wayne, Indiana, United States; 41°07′02″N 85°06′30″W
- Campus: 688 acres (2.78 km^{2}) ^{[2]}; Suburban
- Colors: Old Gold and Black
- Nickname: Mastodons
- Sporting affiliations: NCAA Division I – Horizon League; MIVA
- Mascot: Don the Mastodon
- Website: www.pfw.edu
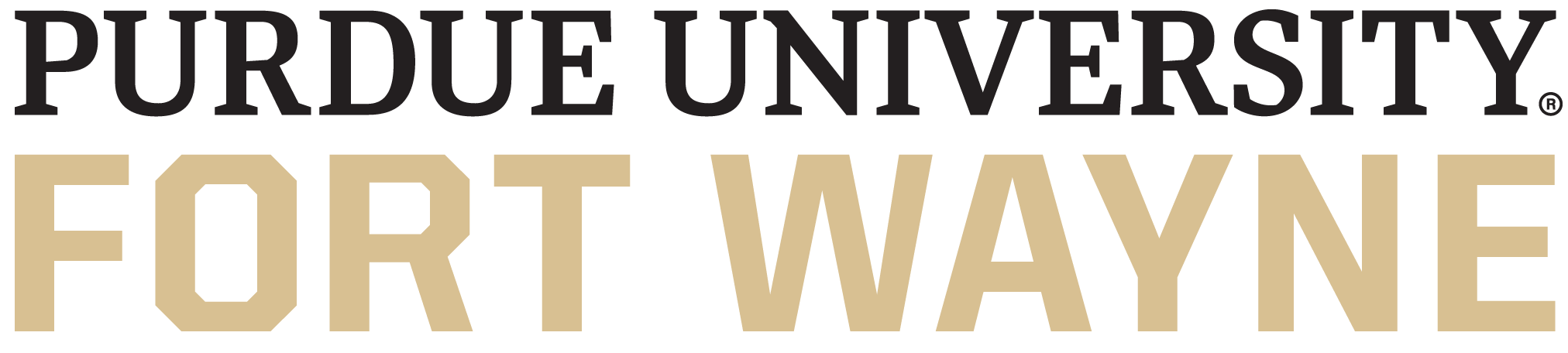

Purdue University Fort Wayne (PFW) is a public university in Fort Wayne, Indiana, United States. A campus of Purdue University, Purdue Fort Wayne was founded on July 1, 2018, when its predecessor university, Indiana University–Purdue University Fort Wayne formally split into two separate institutions: Purdue University Fort Wayne and Indiana University Fort Wayne.

Its athletic teams are the Purdue Fort Wayne Mastodons. Most of the university's 14 men's and women's athletic teams compete in Division I of the NCAA Horizon League; the men's volleyball team competes in the Midwestern Intercollegiate Volleyball Association.

== History ==
In 1941, Purdue University permanently established the Purdue University Center in downtown Fort Wayne to provide a site for students to begin their undergraduate studies prior to transferring to the West Lafayette main campus to complete their degree. Twenty-four years earlier, Indiana University also began offering courses in Fort Wayne. From 1958 to 1964, both universities began the process of combining the two extension centers into one joint university, known as Indiana University – Purdue University Fort Wayne (IPFW).

IPFW opened on September 17, 1964, following nearly two years of construction on a 114 acres (0.46 km^{2}) site northeast of downtown Fort Wayne. It awarded its first four-year degree in 1968. Eight years later, in 1976, IPFW absorbed the Fort Wayne Art Institute, an art school that had served the Fort Wayne community since 1897. In 1998, this academic unit was renamed the School of Fine and Performing Arts, later becoming the College of Visual and Performing Arts.

After several years of talks between IPFW, Purdue, and IU, IPFW was divided into two universities on July 1, 2018: Purdue University Fort Wayne, and Indiana University Fort Wayne. The division moved all departments involved in health care to Indiana University Fort Wayne, and all others into Purdue University Fort Wayne. The Philosophy and Geosciences departments, along with academic programs in French and German, were closed on January 1, 2017.

== Campus ==
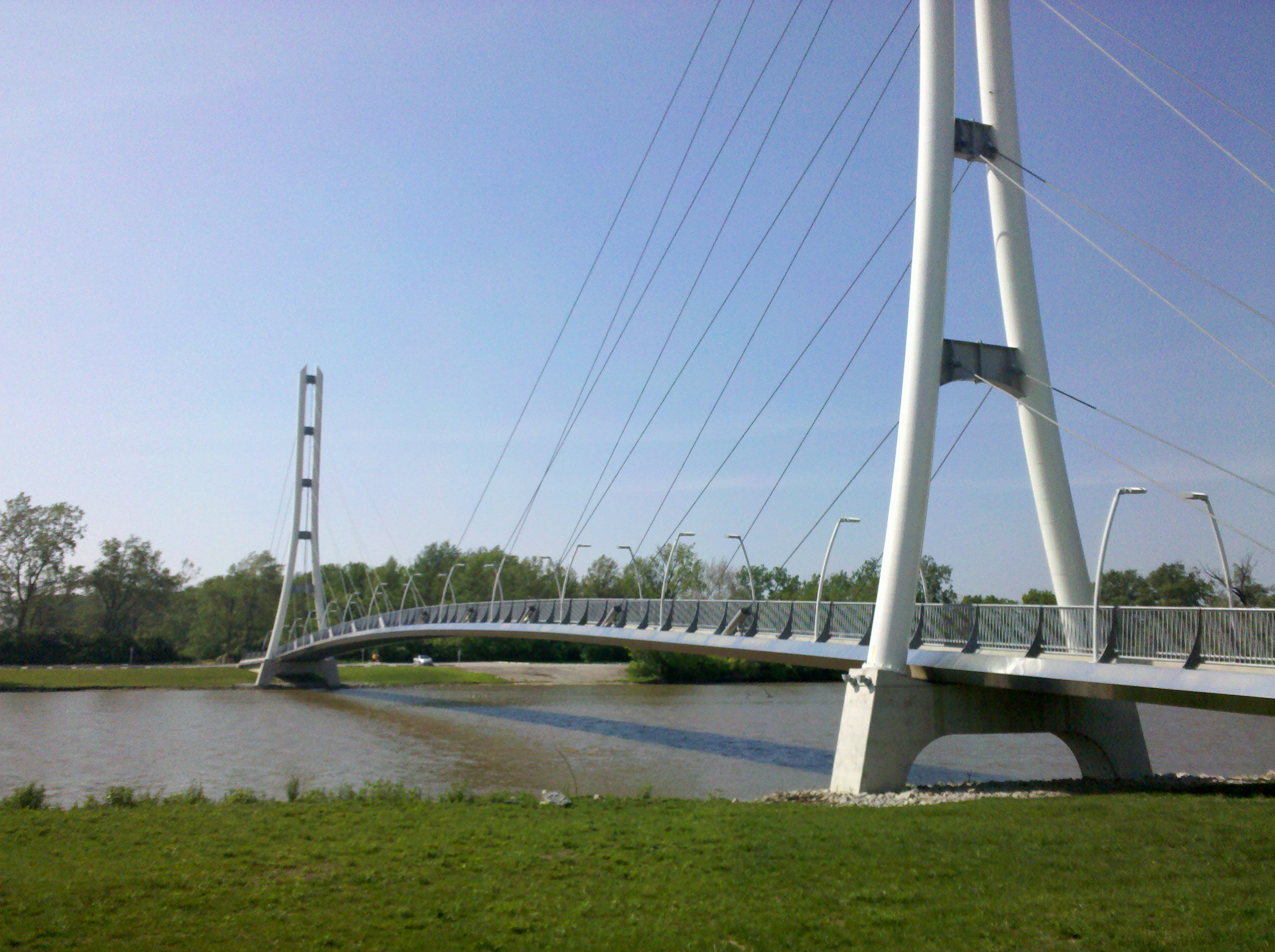
The Ron Venderly Family Bridge crosses the St. Joseph River, connecting the former McKay Family Farm with the Main Academic Campus.

The Purdue Fort Wayne campus is 688 acres (2.78 km^{2}), encompassing four main campus areas, including 40 buildings which cover 2,668,078 square feet (247,872.6 m^{2}). The Main Academic Campus, bounded by East Coliseum Boulevard (Indiana State Road 930) to the south, Crescent Avenue to the east, St. Joseph River to the west, and Canterbury Green Apartment complex and golf course to the north, includes the majority of academic and administrative buildings and parking.

The Waterfield Student Housing Campus, bounded by Crescent Avenue to the west, East Coliseum Boulevard and Trier Road to the south, and Hobson Road to the East, contains all of the privately owned residence halls. The main academic campus and Waterfield campus are connected via the Crescent Avenue Pedestrian Bridge, elevated above Crescent Avenue.

The Research-Incubator Campus, bounded by St. Joe Road to the west, Stellhorn Road to the south, Dean Drive to the north, and Sirlin Drive to the east includes the Northeast Indiana Innovation Center, a business incubator for entrepreneurs. This area of the campus was acquired in 2007 after the Fort Wayne State Developmental Center's closure, with the land donated between IPFW and Ivy Tech Community College of Indiana.

The former McKay Family Farm, located on the western bank of the St. Joseph River, is bounded by East Coliseum Boulevard to the south, St. Joseph River to the east, and development to the north and west. The Plex indoor soccer facility, Hefner Soccer Complex, Holiday Inn hotel, and Steel Dynamics Keith E. Busse Alumni Center are located on this portion of the campus, connected to the main academic campus via the pedestrian-only Ron Venderly Family Bridge. The Holiday Inn operates on property leased from the Indiana–Purdue Foundation, and is affiliated with Purdue Fort Wayne's Hospitality Management Program.

== Administration ==
Purdue Fort Wayne is governed by the Purdue University Board of Trustees and the Purdue Fort Wayne Faculty Senate. The Indiana–Purdue Foundation owns most of the land that constitutes Purdue Fort Wayne and has entered into a 99-year lease with Allen County for additional land for $1.

== Academics ==
Purdue University Fort Wayne is accredited by the Higher Learning Commission and offers more than 200 academic options.

The university's academic programs are divided into several colleges, divisions, and schools:

- College of Liberal Arts
- College of Science
- College of Engineering, Technology, and Computer Science
- College of Visual and Performing Arts
- Doermer School of Business
- Integrated Studies
- School of Education

Prior to July 1, 2021, the College of Liberal Arts and the College of Science were combined in the College of Arts and Sciences. On the same date, the College of Professional Studies ceased operations.

=== Library system ===
Helmke Library was named in 1977 after Walter E. Helmke, who was a prominent Fort Wayne attorney and an active member of the I.U. Board of Trustees and the Indiana-Purdue Foundation. Helmke Library works to provide physical and virtual resources and services to assist student learning and faculty research.

The library has four floors, with the second floor being Learning Commons. It gives students and staff access to Walb Student Union and Hilliard Gates Sports Center through a glass-enclosed elevated walkway. The learning commons include librarian research consulting, the Writing Center, IT services, and places to study in groups or individually. The Helmke Library also provides spaces for students and faculty to connect with such as the Digital Arts and Humanities lab, group study rooms, instructional spaces, and meeting spaces.

=== Academic journal ===
Purdue University Fort Wayne publishes an academic journal entitled "Clio: A Journal of Literature, History, and the Philosophy of History." It is "a double-blind peer-reviewed international interdisciplinary journal, that publishes scholarly essays" three times per year.

== Athletics ==
Purdue Fort Wayne student athletes, known as the Purdue Fort Wayne Mastodons, compete as a National Collegiate Athletic Association Division I school in the Horizon League, and in the Midwestern Intercollegiate Volleyball Association for men's volleyball. The university participates in 14 men's and women's sports.
