= Michael A. Wartell =

Chancellor of Indiana University

8th Chancellor of IPFW
- In office 1994 – June 30, 2012
- Preceded by: Joanne B. Lantz
- Succeeded by: Vicky Carwein

Personal details
- Born: November 4, 1946 (age 79) Albuquerque, New Mexico
- Spouse: Ruth Wartell
- Children: Justin Wartell; Richie Wartell
- Education: University of New Mexico; Yale University
- Organizations: IPFW Sandia National Laboratories; Humboldt State University; James Madison University; Slippery Rock University Metropolitan State College of Denver

Michael A. Wartell (born November 4, 1946) is chancellor emeritus of Indiana University-Purdue University Fort Wayne (IPFW), where he served as the eighth chancellor from 1994 to 2012. His 18 years of service was the longest tenure of any previous chancellor. Prior to this appointment, he served as IPFW's vice chancellor for academic affairs for one year.

== Personal background ==
Wartell was born in Albuquerque, New Mexico. He received a B.S. in chemistry from the University of New Mexico in 1967 and an M.S. and Ph.D. in physical chemistry from Yale University in 1968 and 1971, respectively. He is married to Ruth, and they have two sons, Justin and Richard.

== Career ==
=== Science ===
Between 1989 and 1993, Wartell was a department manager for Sandia National Laboratories in Albuquerque, New Mexico His responsibilities included development and management of educational outreach and special technologies programs.

=== Academia ===
Wartell began his career as an assistant professor of chemistry at Metropolitan State College of Denver in 1971, where he was promoted to associate professor of chemistry and served as the department chair between 1975 and 1978. He was the dean of the School of Natural Sciences and Mathematics as well as professor of chemistry at Slippery Rock University in Slippery Rock, Pennsylvania, during the 1978–79 academic year. Between 1979 and 1984, Wartell was the dean of the College of Letters and Sciences and professor of chemistry at James Madison University in Harrisonburg, Virginia. He made a cross-country move to Humboldt State University in Arcata, California, to become the provost and vice president for academic affairs and professor of chemistry between 1984 and 1989. He returned to the private sector and Sandia National Laboratories for approximately four years before re-entering academia at IPFW.

=== Government service ===
He currently serves on the board of the Army War College, and chairs its educational advisory committee. Previously, he served on the U.S. Army Science Board (1981–87 and 1997–2010), working on such subjects as chemical warfare, manpower and logistics, and decontamination. He also served on the Department of Defense's Defense Science Board (1998–2005) and as chair of the Defense Intelligence Agency Science and Technology Advisory Board (1987–2005). He was a member and chair of the board of visitors of the Defense Systems Management College (1984–88), and he has been a consultant to government agencies and defense contractors.

=== Community leadership ===
He is a member of the board of directors of the Greater Fort Wayne Chamber of Commerce, Corporate Council; Leadership Fort Wayne; Junior Achievement; the Urban League; the Boy Scouts of America, Anthony Wayne Area Council; the Northeast Indiana Innovation Center; and the Fort Wayne Philharmonic.

=== Accolades ===
Wartell is the recipient of a Sagamore of the Wabash, Indiana's second-highest civilian honor for service to the state. He is also a member of numerous honorary societies such as Phi Beta Kappa, Phi Kappa Phi, and Kappa Mu Epsilon and a recipient of major research grants in excess of $10 million in chemistry and science education.

== Indiana University–Purdue University Fort Wayne ==
As chancellor, Wartell was responsible for Indiana's fifth-largest university and the only comprehensive public university in northeast Indiana. The Wartell administration developed and administered two successful five-year strategic plans. His administration's most noteworthy accomplishments include expanding the number of degree and certificate options at the undergraduate and graduate levels; overseeing the addition of more than 100 acres (0.40 km^{2}) to the campus property; making IPFW the first regional campus in Indiana to construct student housing; instituting the Centers of Excellence; securing a number of endowed or named professorships and top-level student scholarships; and arranging numerous public/private partnerships with organizations such as Parkview Health Systems, the Fort Wayne Center for Learning, the Northeast Indiana Innovation Center, and PBS39 WFWA-DT.

Under Wartell, the university pursued its most aggressive building construction efforts in its history. His leadership was responsible for the construction of Parking Garage 2, the Science Building, the PLEX indoor soccer building and the Hefner Soccer Fields (12 outdoor soccer fields), the Willis Family Bridge between the main campus and the residential campus, IPFW Student Housing on the Waterfield Campus (stages I–III), the Rhinehart Music Center, the Holiday Inn at IPFW and the Coliseum, the Ron Venderly Family Bridge spanning the St. Joseph River between the Main Campus and West Campus, the Medical Education Center, and the Student Services Complex.

Also during Wartell's tenure, IPFW's endowment and level of public and private funding significantly increased to previously unprecedented levels. The endowment rose from $3 million to $56 million. In support of various projects, Wartell raised more than $100 million from external sources. The Wartell administration also ushered its 16 men's and women's sports into NCAA Division I athletic competition, and membership in The Summit League conference.

Wartell was forced to leave IPFW in 2012 in accordance with Purdue University's mandatory retirement age policy. In a lawsuit settled in early 2015, Wartell said that this policy had not been enforced before and that he was the victim of gender discrimination and a breach of contract.
