= Indiana University Fort Wayne =

American university

Coordinates: 41.118822°N 85.109024°W

- Other name: IUFW
- Type: Public regional master's university
- Established: July 1, 2018; 8 years ago
- Parent institution: Indiana University Indianapolis
- Affiliations: Indiana University
- Vice-Chancellor: Deborah R. Garrison
- Students: 1,091 (Fall 2025)
- Location: Fort Wayne, Indiana, U.S.
- Campus: 688 acres (2.78 km^{2}) ^{[2]}; Suburban
- Colors: Cream and Crimson
- Nickname: Red Foxes
- Website: www.iufw.edu

Indiana University Fort Wayne (IUFW) is a public university in Fort Wayne, Indiana, United States. It is a regional campus of Indiana University founded on July 1, 2018, when its predecessor university, Indiana University–Purdue University Fort Wayne, split into two separate institutions: Indiana University Fort Wayne and Purdue University Fort Wayne (PFW). IUFW is administered through Indiana University Indianapolis.

== History ==
In 1917, Indiana University started offering courses in downtown Fort Wayne to 142 students in 12 courses. Twenty-four years later, Purdue University permanently established the Purdue University Center at a separate location in downtown Fort Wayne to provide a site for students to begin their undergraduate studies prior to transferring to the West Lafayette main campus to complete their degree. From 1958 to 1964, both universities began the process of combining the two extension centers into one joint university, known as Indiana University–Purdue University Fort Wayne (IPFW).

IPFW opened on September 17, 1964, following nearly two years of construction on a 114 acres (0.46 km^{2}) site northeast of downtown Fort Wayne. It awarded its first four-year degree in 1968. Eight years later, in 1976, IPFW absorbed the Fort Wayne Art Institute, an art school that had served the Fort Wayne community since 1897.

After several years of talks between IPFW, Purdue, and IU, IPFW was divided into two universities on July 1, 2018: Purdue University Fort Wayne and Indiana University Fort Wayne. The division moved all departments in the health sciences to Indiana University Fort Wayne and all others into Purdue University Fort Wayne. The Philosophy and Geosciences departments, however, were closed on January 1, 2017.

== Campus ==
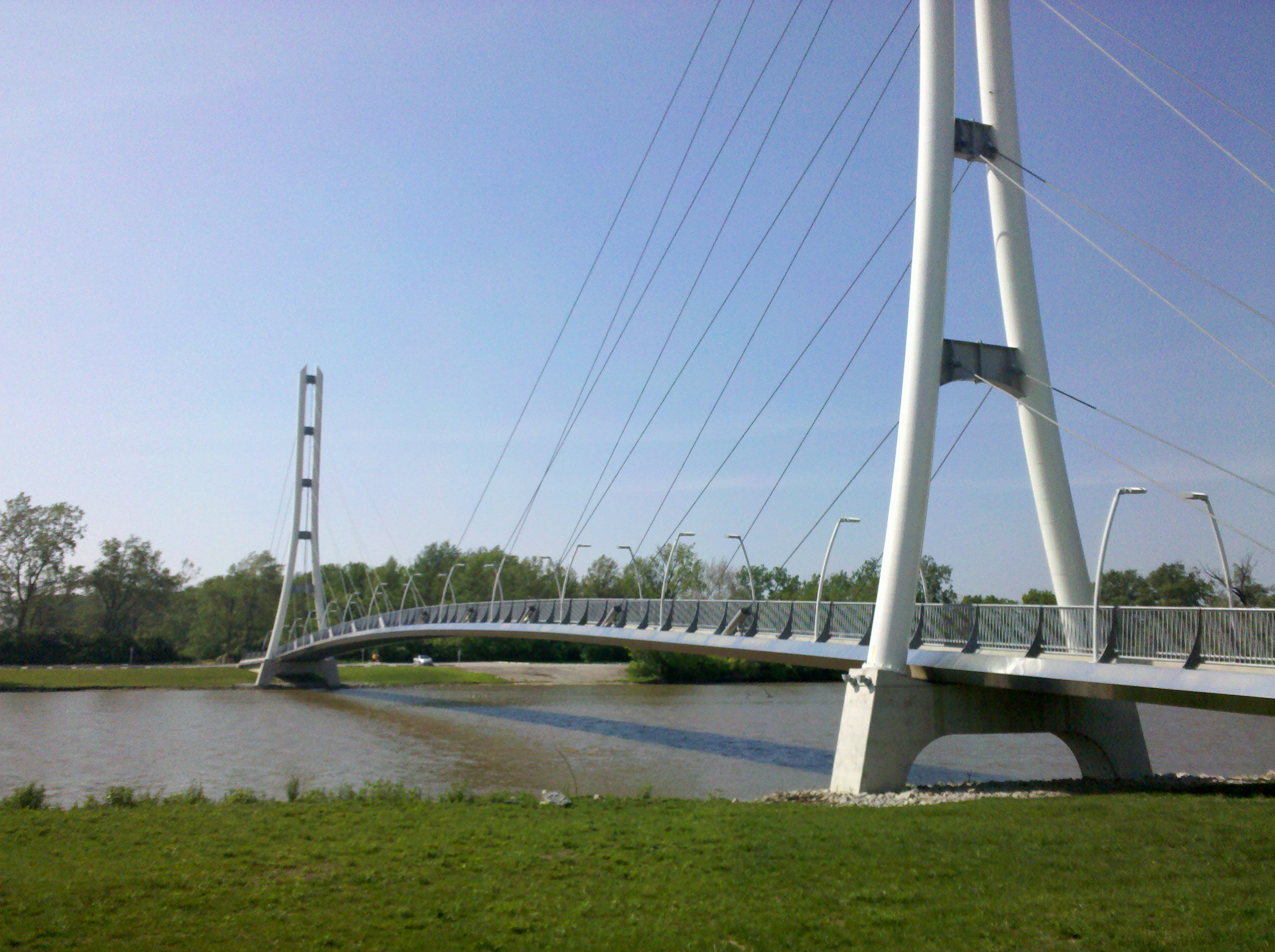
The Ron Venderly Family Bridge crosses the St. Joseph River, connecting the former McKay Family Farm with the Main Academic Campus.

IU Fort Wayne shares a 688 acres (2.78 km^{2}) campus with Purdue University Fort Wayne. This campus encompasses four main areas, including 40 buildings which cover 2,668,078 square feet (247,872.6 m^{2}). The Main Academic Campus, bounded by East Coliseum Boulevard (Indiana State Road 930) to the south, Crescent Avenue to the east, St. Joseph River to the west, and Canterbury Green Apartment complex and golf course to the north includes the majority of academic and administrative buildings and parking.

The Waterfield Student Housing Campus, bounded by Crescent Avenue to the west, East Coliseum Boulevard and Trier Road to the south, and Hobson Road to the East, contains all of the privately owned residence halls. The main academic campus and Waterfield campus are connected via the Crescent Avenue Pedestrian Bridge, elevated above Crescent Avenue.

The Research-Incubator Campus, bounded by St. Joe Road to the west, Stellhorn Road to the south, Dean Drive to the north, and Sirlin Drive to the east includes the Northeast Indiana Innovation Center, a business incubator for entrepreneurs. This area of the campus was acquired in 2007 after the Fort Wayne State Developmental Center's closure, with the land donated between IPFW and Ivy Tech Community College of Indiana.

The former McKay Family Farm, located on the western bank of the St. Joseph River, is bounded by East Coliseum Boulevard to the south, St. Joseph River to the east, and development to the north and west. The Plex indoor soccer facility, Hefner Soccer Complex, Holiday Inn hotel, and Steel Dynamics Keith E. Busse Alumni Center are located on this portion of the campus, connected to the main academic campus via the pedestrian-only Ron Venderly Family Bridge. The Holiday Inn operates on property leased from the Indiana–Purdue Foundation and is affiliated with PFW's Hospitality Management Program.

== Academics ==
IU Fort Wayne offers degree programs in dentistry, nursing, medical imaging, medicine, and social work.

== See also ==
- Indiana University–Purdue University Indianapolis, which administered IU Fort Wayne before being dissolved in 2024
- Indiana University Indianapolis, which administers IU Fort Wayne following the dissolution of IUPUI
- Indiana University–Purdue University Columbus, which had been operated by IUPUI before that school's dissolution, and has been replaced by Indiana University Columbus
- Purdue University Fort Wayne
