= Indiana University–Purdue University Fort Wayne =

Public university in Fort Wayne, Indiana, US (1964–2018)

Coordinates: 41.118822°N 85.109024°W

- Type: Joint public regional master's university
- Active: September 17, 1964; 61 years ago–June 30, 2018; 8 years ago
- Academic affiliations: Purdue University; Indiana University
- Location: Fort Wayne, Indiana, U.S.
- Campus: Suburban, 688 acres (278 ha)^{[2]}
- Colors: Blue and white
- Nickname: Mastodons
- Sporting affiliations: NCAA Division I Summit League
- Mascot: Don the Mastodon
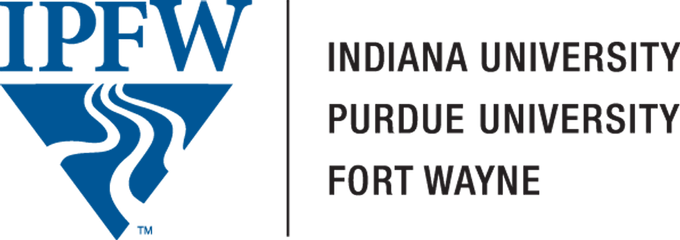

Indiana University–Purdue University Fort Wayne (IPFW) was a public university in Fort Wayne, Indiana. Founded in 1964, IPFW was a cooperatively managed regional campus of two state university systems: Indiana University and Purdue University. IPFW hit its highest enrollment in 2014, with 13,459 undergraduate and postgraduate students in nine colleges and schools, including a branch of the Indiana University School of Medicine. During its last academic year (2017–2018), IPFW had a total enrollment of 10,414 students. IPFW offered more than 200 graduate and undergraduate degree programs through IU or Purdue universities. The university's 14 men's and women's athletic teams competed in Division I of the NCAA Summit League.

On July 1, 2018, the two universities parted company in Fort Wayne. The health sciences programs on the campus became Indiana University Fort Wayne, and the other programs became Purdue University Fort Wayne (PFW). About two weeks before the split took effect, the athletic program, which was inherited solely by PFW, changed its branding from Fort Wayne Mastodons to Purdue Fort Wayne Mastodons.

== History ==
History at a glance
IPFW began as co-located extension campuses via the move to the joint campus in 1964, encompassing the:
•	Indiana University – Fort Wayne Extension	Established	1917
•	Purdue University – Fort Wayne Extension	Established	1941

and expanded through the 1976 merger with:
•	Fort Wayne Art School	Established	1897
Fort Wayne Art Institute	Renamed	1966
	Type	private

In 1917, Indiana University started offering courses in downtown Fort Wayne to 142 students in 12 courses. At a separate downtown location, Purdue University permanently established the Purdue University Center in 1941 to provide a site in Fort Wayne for students to begin their undergraduate studies prior to transferring to the West Lafayette main campus to complete their degree.

Under the direction of Purdue University President Frederick Hovde, Indiana University President Herman Wells, IU trustee John Hastings, and Purdue trustee Alfred Kettler Sr., the Indiana University and Purdue University extension centers began merging in 1958 via the formation of the Indiana–Purdue Foundation. To serve the extension centers' now combined mission in Fort Wayne, the Indiana–Purdue Foundation acquired a 99-year lease on agricultural land owned by Allen County to form a campus totaling 114 acres (0.46 km^{2}) at the then-suburban northeast edge of Fort Wayne on the eastern bank of the St. Joseph River. Indiana University–Purdue University Fort Wayne opened on September 17, 1964, following nearly two years of construction that began on October 18, 1962. The first all-inclusive building on campus was known as the Education Building, but it has since been renamed Kettler Hall in honor of the combined university's chief advocate. Kettler's vision and passion during the 1950s made IPFW possible. IPFW awarded its first four-year degree in 1968 after awarding two-year degrees through the IU and Purdue Fort Wayne extension centers prior to the formation of the joint IPFW campus.

In the spirit of Indiana University's 1967 acquisition of the Herron School of Art in Indianapolis, which helped form IUPUI two years later, the Indiana General Assembly approved a similar merger of the Fort Wayne Art Institute with IPFW in 1976. The Fort Wayne Art Institute was founded in 1897 as the Fort Wayne Art School. Until 1991, the Fort Wayne Art Institute and resulting academic unit within IPFW maintained a small campus in downtown Fort Wayne. In 1998, this academic unit was renamed the School of Fine and Performing Arts. During the late 1990s, the School of Fine and Performing Arts and its primary classroom building was renamed the School of Visual and Performing Arts and Visual and Performing Arts Building, respectively. In the mid-2000s, the Purdue University board of trustees granted the school "college" status, becoming the College of Visual and Performing Arts.

In 1988, a coalition of the then-Lincoln National Corporation under the direction of Ian Rolland, the M.E. Raker Foundation, the Olive B. Cole Foundation, and the Foellinger Foundation purchased an additional 152 acres (0.62 km^{2}) on the west bank of the St. Joseph River, known as the former McKay Family Farm. In 2007, the State of Indiana completed the process of closing the Fort Wayne State Developmental Center. A portion of the grounds had been transferred to IPFW years earlier for construction of the Northeast Indiana Innovation Center. The remaining property and buildings of the 142-acre (0.57 km^{2}) developmental center was transferred later in 2007, with the land split between IPFW (40 acres [0.16 km^{2}]) and Ivy Tech Community College (45 acres [0.18 km^{2}]).

IPFW was divided into two universities on July 1, 2018: Purdue University Fort Wayne, and Indiana University Fort Wayne. The division moved all departments involved in health care to Indiana University Fort Wayne, and all others into Purdue University Fort Wayne. The split generated a moderate level of controversy, as the nursing program was formerly administered by the Purdue School of Nursing. This marked the second time Indiana University had taken over a Purdue healthcare-related institution (the other being Purdue's school of medicine in 1908). The Philosophy and Geosciences departments were closed on January 1, 2017.

== Campus ==
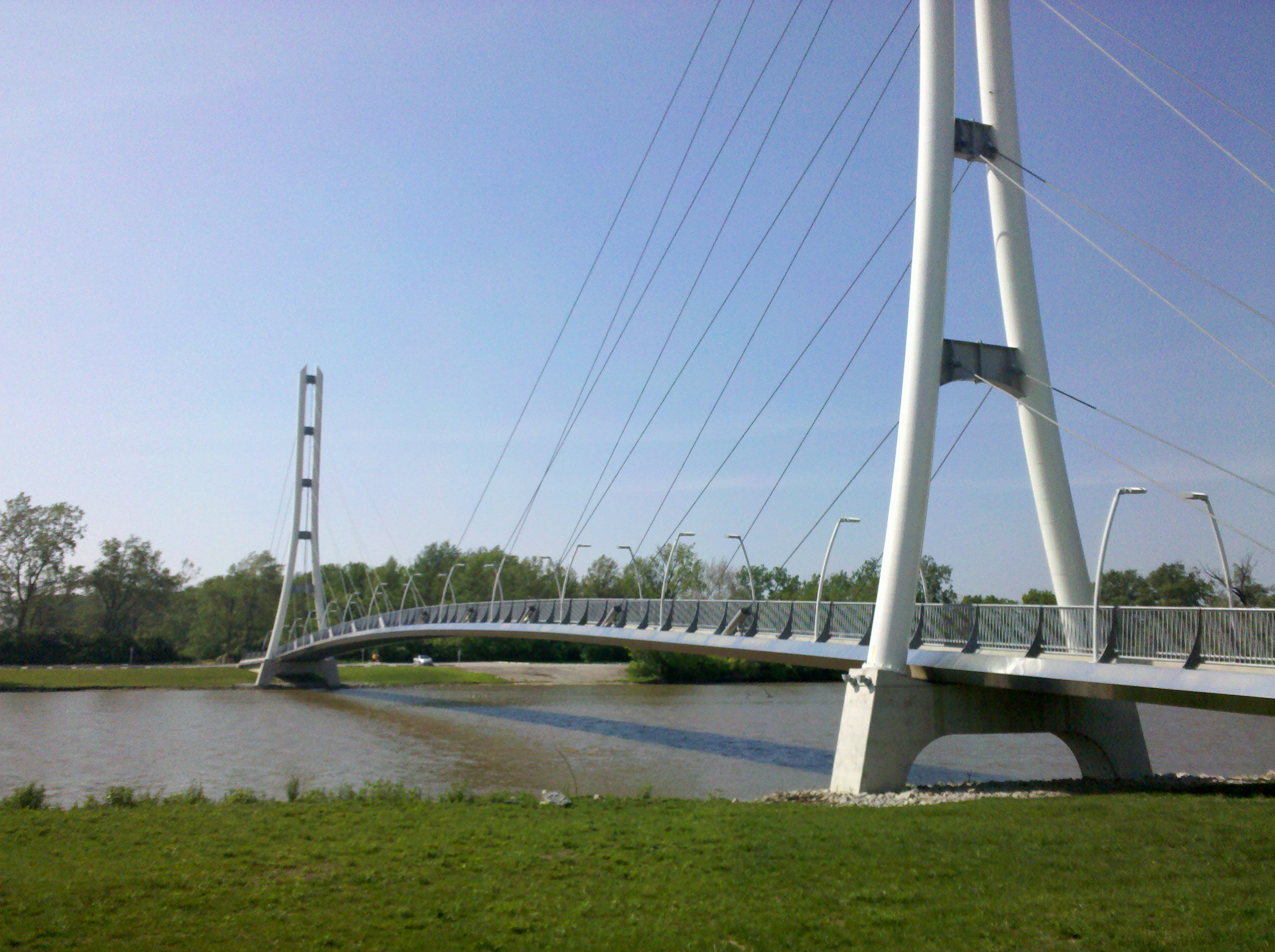
The Ron Venderly Family Bridge crosses the St. Joseph River, connecting the former McKay Family Farm with the Main Academic Campus.

IPFW's campus is 688 acres (2.78 km^{2}), encompassing four main campus areas, including 40 buildings which cover 2,668,078 square feet (247,872.6 m^{2}). The Main Academic Campus, bounded by East Coliseum Boulevard (Indiana State Road 930) to the south, Crescent Avenue to the east, St. Joseph River to the west, and Canterbury Green Apartment complex and golf course to the north includes the majority of academic and administrative buildings and parking.

The Waterfield Student Housing Campus, bounded by Crescent Avenue to the west, East Coliseum Boulevard and Trier Road to the south, and Hobson Road to the East, contains all of the privately owned residence halls. The main academic campus and Waterfield campus are connected via the Crescent Avenue Pedestrian Bridge, elevated above Crescent Avenue.

The Research-Incubator Campus, bounded by St. Joe Road to the west, Stellhorn Road to the south, Dean Drive to the north, and Sirlin Drive to the east includes the Northeast Indiana Innovation Center, a business incubator for entrepreneurs. This area of the campus was acquired in 2007 after the Fort Wayne State Developmental Center's closure, with the land donated between IPFW and Ivy Tech Community College of Indiana.

The former McKay Family Farm, located on the western bank of the St. Joseph River, is bounded by East Coliseum Boulevard to the south, St. Joseph River to the east, and development to the north and west. The Plex indoor soccer facility, Hefner Soccer Complex, Holiday Inn hotel and Steel Dynamics Keith E. Busse Alumni Center are located on this portion of the campus, connected to the main academic campus via the pedestrian-only Ron Venderly Family Bridge. The Holiday Inn operates on property leased from the Indiana–Purdue Foundation and is affiliated with IPFW's Hospitality Management Program.

For three years a grant through the state of Indiana provided bus service between the student housing and the campus but as of 2015 that program was cancelled. Pedestrian and bicycling traffic are also accommodated through the university's direct connection with the Fort Wayne Rivergreenway, a designated National Recreation Trail. The trail is part of the larger 70-mile (110 km) Fort Wayne Trail Network.

=== Architecture ===
IPFW buildings generally feature brick in various shades of brown or tan, a nod to the brick façades of Purdue University's West Lafayette campus buildings. This contrasts with IPFW's sibling university, Indiana University–Purdue University Indianapolis, where the buildings generally feature Indiana limestone façades. The grounds at IPFW are manicured and landscaped as a multiple-hundred-acre park due in part to the generosity of Virginia Ayers, an avid long-time exerciser on campus who willed her estate to IPFW upon her death in 1986 (IPFW University Archives).

=== Satellite facilities ===
IPFW operated a satellite facility in Warsaw, Indiana (about 40 miles (64 km) northwest of the main campus) from 2003 to 2013. IPFW Warsaw Center was closed due to improved distance learning technologies and increasing reliance on e-learning.

== Administration ==
IPFW was governed in various ways via the Purdue University Board of Trustees, the Indiana University Board of Trustees, and the IPFW Faculty Senate. Purdue served as the fiscal agent for IPFW's budget and substantially represented IPFW during budgetary negotiations with the Indiana General Assembly. The Indiana–Purdue Foundation owns most of the land that constitutes IPFW and has entered into a 99-year lease with Allen County for additional land for US$1. The IPFW Faculty Senate represented the faculty in the university's shared governance model. The desire was so strong for an expansion of IPFW during the 1980s, the Faculty Senate and Indiana–Purdue Foundation explored full independence from both Purdue and IU, not entirely unlike the University of Southern Indiana's independence from Indiana State University in 1985. Relations with Purdue later improved, as did the level of funding from the State of Indiana. IPFW was designated Indiana's Multisystem Metropolitan University by the Indiana General Assembly in May 2015.

== Academics ==
IPFW was selective, accepting 82.1 percent of applicants for the fall 2012 semester. The university had a student-to-teacher ratio of 17:1, with 51 percent of classes holding 20 or fewer students (2.9 percent had classes with 50 or more students).

Either Purdue or IU awarded IPFW's degrees on a program-by-program basis. IPFW's colleges, schools, and divisions were not each identified specifically as IU units or as Purdue units. Through an agreement between the IU and Purdue trustees, most of IPFW's university services were administratively operated through Purdue's processes. This is in contrast to IPFW's sibling university, Indiana University–Purdue University Indianapolis (IUPUI), where IUPUI is a core campus of the Indiana University System, where IUPUI's university services are administratively operated through the Indiana University System, and where IUPUI's schools and academic divisions are each strongly identified by name as IU or Purdue aligned.

=== Colleges, divisions, and schools ===
- College of Arts and Sciences
- College of Education and Public Policy
- College of Engineering, Technology, and Computer Science
- College of Health and Human Services
- College of Visual and Performing Arts
- Division of Continuing Studies
- Indiana University School of Medicine–Fort Wayne
- Indiana University School of Social Work
- Richard T. Doermer School of Business
- College of Fine Arts and Film

=== Student body ===
Demographics
	Student body	U.S. Census
White (non-Hispanic)	82.0%	72.4%
African American	5.1%	12.6%
Asian American	2.5%	4.8%
Native American or Alaska Native	1.0%	0.9%
Hispanic American (of any race)	5.0%	16.4%
Two or more races	2.7%	2.9%
International students	1.7%	(N/A)

As of 2014, IPFW enrolled 13,214 students, consisting of 12,674 undergraduate students and 540 postgraduate students. A slight majority of IPFW students were first-generation college students, at 51 percent. IPFW consisted of 55 percent female students and 45 percent male students.

=== Library system ===
The Walter E. Helmke Library, the only public university library in northeast Indiana, was dedicated in 1977 and covers 113,000 square feet (10,500 m^{2}). Ground was broken in 2009 for a new US$42.4 million Student Services Complex, extending the second floor Learning Commons through a 265-foot-long (81 m) glass-enclosed elevated walkway, connecting Helmke Library to Walb Student Union and Hilliard Gates Sports Center. In November 2011, the Student Services Complex and Learning Commons were opened for use. The Learning Commons includes librarian research consulting, the Writing Center, IT services computing, and areas for group and individual study.

Helmke houses nearly 1 million printed materials available to students, faculty, staff, and the general public. IPFW students, faculty and staff have 24/7 access to thousands of electronic books, journals and databases, the IU and WorldCat catalogs, and document delivery service. The mDON: mastodon Digital Object Network is a growing digital library of IPFW and local community resources. Special collections highlight photography, distinguished faculty lectures, athletics, and streaming video of the Omnibus Lecture Series. The open access IPFW repository Opus: Research & Creativity at IPFW offers a portal to faculty, staff and student scholarly accomplishments as well as free downloads of many of the materials.

=== Weekend supplementary education ===
The IPFW Japanese Saturday School (JSS; フォートウェイン補習授業校 Fōtowein Hoshū Jugyō Kō), a weekend Japanese educational program designated by the Japanese Ministry of Education, was affiliated with IPFW and held its classes on the university campus. It was established in 2006.

== Student life ==
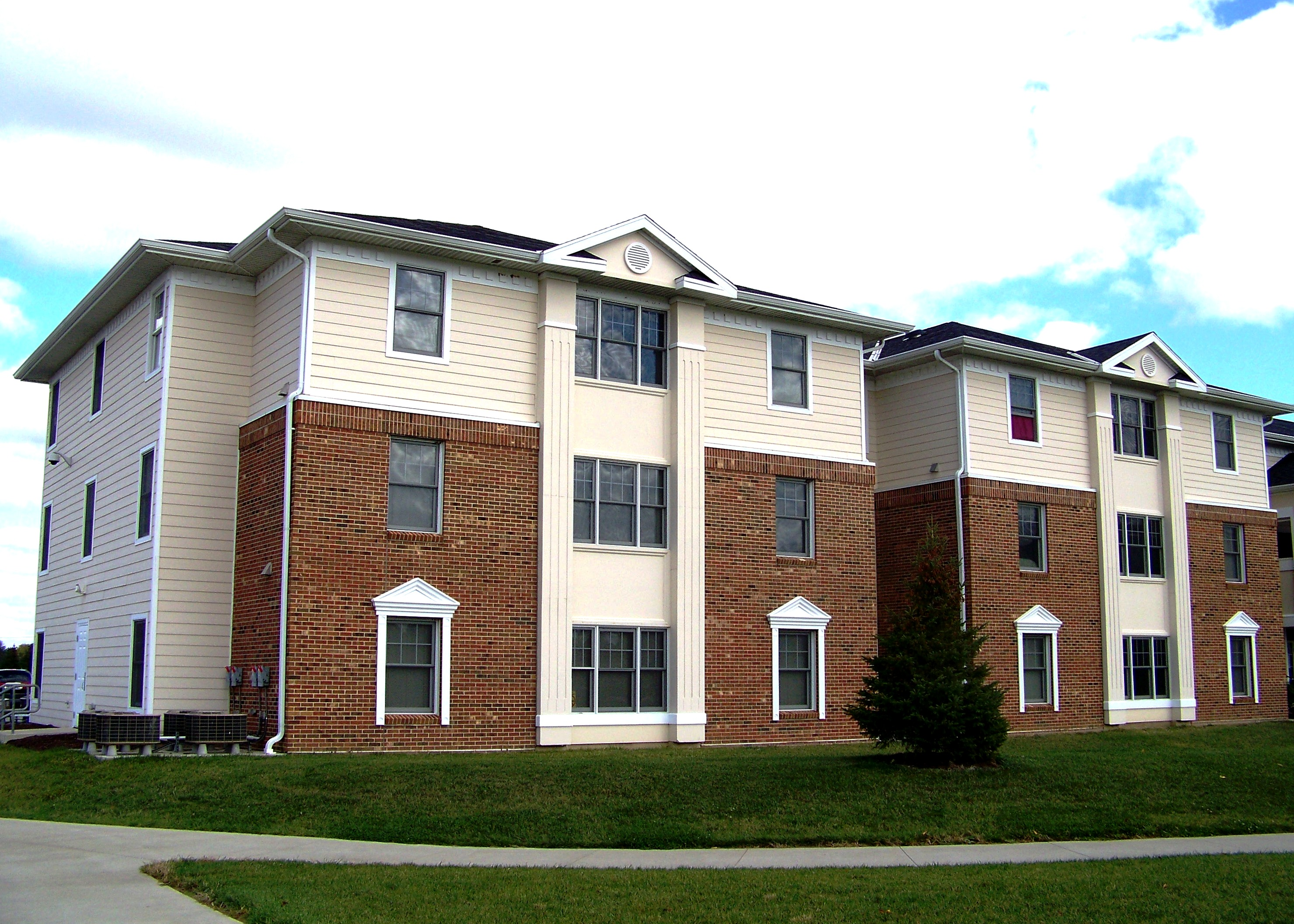
Waterfield Campus Student Housing in 2008.

=== Housing ===
IPFW was predominately a commuter school, with only six percent of the student body living in university-operated housing and 94 percent living off campus; 99 percent of students had cars on campus. Beginning with fall semester 2004, the university introduced student dormitories on the Waterfield Campus. Phase II of the student housing initiative continued with two more buildings in August 2007, with total student housing occupancy approaching nearly 750 residents. Phase III of the project, which opened in August 2010, added 448 beds divided between four new residence buildings, bringing total occupancy to more than 1,200 students. Another student community center, The Clubhouse, a larger version of the existing Cole Commons, and a maintenance facility were also added.

=== Media ===
The Communicator was IPFW's student newspaper. College Access Television was operated by IPFW and was one of five educational-access television channels serving Fort Wayne and Allen County. CATV was available on Frontier Communications and Comcast cable systems and served as the higher education cable access channel and provided opportunities in higher education for area residents. The university leased a portion of its East Campus, at the East Coliseum Boulevard and Crescent Avenue intersection, to northeast Indiana's PBS member station, WFWA-TV.

== Athletics ==
The IPFW athletic program, known from 2016 to 2018 as the Fort Wayne Mastodons, competed as a National Collegiate Athletic Association (NCAA) Division I school in The Summit League, and in the Midwestern Intercollegiate Volleyball Association for men's volleyball. The university participated in 14 men's and women's sports. Before joining NCAA Division I athletics, IPFW competed in the Great Lakes Valley Conference in NCAA Division II. Following the division of IPFW into separate Purdue and IU universities, the athletic program was rebranded as the Purdue Fort Wayne Mastodons. The program is now a member of the Horizon League, having moved from the Summit League in July 2020.

== Community health programs ==
The Northeast Indiana Area Health Education Center is a collaboration among the former IPFW College of Health and Human Services, Indiana Area Health Education Center Program office, Indiana University School of Medicine–Fort Wayne, Allen County Health Disparity Coalition, the Dr. Jeff Towles Health Disparities Initiative, and other community healthcare providers and schools serving 19 counties in northeast and east central Indiana. IPFW's role in this collaboration has been inherited by IU Fort Wayne.

The Lafayette Street Family Health Clinic is a nurse-practitioner clinic that family planning services to low-income women and men. The clinic offers most birth control methods, pap smears for cervical cancer screening, pregnancy tests, clinical breast exams, emergency contraception, testing and treatment of Sexually Transmitted Infections (STIs), HIV counseling and testing, and education on reproductive health. The clinic also serves as a remote site for the IUFW Dental Clinic (formerly IPFW Dental Clinic). The on-campus IUFW Dental Clinic offers cleanings, fluoride treatments, and dental sealants, plus full-mouth, bite-wing, and X-rays for the community.

== Events ==
=== Omnibus Lecture Series ===
IPFW's Omnibus Lecture Series presented diverse ideas through speakers to the university community and the residents of northeast Indiana. Featured presenters included Henry Winkler, Marlee Matlin, Cheech Marin, Neil deGrasse Tyson, Betty Friedan, James Earl Jones, Jeb Bush, Robert F. Kennedy Jr., Ralph Nader, Joyce Carol Oates, Deepak Chopra, Gail Sheehy, Hal Holbrook, Sandra Day O’Connor, and Sean Astin.

=== Tapestry: A Day for You ===
Tapestry: A Day for You hosts guest speakers and conducts break-out sessions that are mindful of women's empowerment at the Allen County War Memorial Coliseum. Tapestry proceeds support the Tapestry Parkview Endowment Fund and the Tapestry gift account and provide scholarships to students studying health sciences at IPFW. Since its beginning in 2002, Tapestry has raised more than $675,000 in scholarship funds and awarded 50 scholarships. Featured keynote speakers have included Dana Reeve, Linda Ellerbee, Patty Duke, Marie Osmond, and Clinton Kelly.

=== Northeast Indiana Defense Industry Mega Conference ===
The NorthEast Indiana Defense Industry Mega Conference (NIDIA) is the largest annual defense-industry conference in the U.S. Midwest. Cybersecurity expert Walter O'Brien was its keynote speaker in 2015.

== Notable alumni ==
IPFW includes 55,000 alumni, 80 percent of which currently live and work in northeast Indiana.

- Lloy Ball, U.S. Olympic men's volleyball team captain (1996, 2000, 2004); U.S. Olympic men's volleyball gold medalist (2008)
- Julia Barr, actress, All My Children
- Tim Berry, Indiana State Treasurer (1999–2007), Indiana State Auditor (2007–2013), Indiana Republican Party Chairman (2013–2015)
- Justin Busch, Indiana State Senator District 16
- Randy Borror, Indiana's 84th District state representative (2001–2010)
- Dan Butler, actor, Frasier
- Frank Gaines, basketball player, Maine Red Claws
- Dennis Kruse, auctioneer, Indiana's 14th District state senator (2004–present)
- Keith O'Conner Murphy, singer and songwriter, Rockabilly Hall of Fame, International recording artist Stacy, Polydor Records (UK) and King Records (United States)
- Mark Souder, U.S. Representative (1995–2010)
- Mario Wuysang, Indonesian basketball player who played for the CLS Knights in the Indonesian Basketball League (1998–1999)
- Thomas Wyss, Indiana's 15th District state senator (1985–2014)
- Shelli Yoder, Miss Indiana 1992, former Democratic nominee for U.S. Congress (IN-9)
- Matt Zbyszewski, beach volleyball, volleyball player, and coach

== Notable faculty ==
- L. W. Beineke, Ph.D., professor of mathematics
- Bernd Jürgen Fischer, Ph.D., professor of history
- George Kalamaras, Ph.D., Indiana State Poet Laureate (2014)
- Linda Rising, Ph.D., assistant professor (1984–1987)
- Anson D. Shupe, Ph.D., professor emeritus of sociology
- Margaret Mary Vojtko
- Michael A. Wartell, Ph.D., eighth chancellor of IPFW (1994–2012)

== See also ==
- Indiana University–Purdue University Indianapolis
- Indiana University–Purdue University Columbus
- Indiana University Fort Wayne
- Purdue University Fort Wayne
