= List of Purdue University presidents =

Purdue University and the associated university system have had 13 official and 5 officially acting presidents since the university was founded in 1869.

== List of presidents ==
No.	Image	Name	Term start	Term end	Duration of Service	Ref(s)
1		Richard Owen	August 13, 1872	March 1, 1874	1 year, 6 months, 16 days	
2		Abraham C. Shortridge	June 12, 1874	November 6, 1875	1 year, 4 months, 25 days	
acting		John S. Hougham	November 6, 1875	April 30, 1876	5 months, 24 days	
3		Emerson E. White	May 1, 1876	August 23, 1883	7 years, 3 months, 22 days	
4		James H. Smart	August 23, 1883	February 21, 1900^{†}	16 years, 5 months, 29 days	
5		Winthrop E. Stone	February 21, 1900	July 17, 1921^{†}	21 years, 5 months, 5 days	
acting		Henry W. Marshall	July 17, 1921	September 1, 1922	1 year, 1 month, 15 days	
6		Edward C. Elliott	September 1, 1922	December 21, 1945	23 years, 3 months, 20 days	
acting		Andrey A. Potter	December 21, 1945	January 1, 1946	11 days	
7		Frederick L. Hovde	January 1, 1946	June 24, 1971	25 years, 5 months, 23 days	
8		Arthur G. Hansen	June 25, 1971	July 1, 1982	11 years, 6 days	
acting		John W. Hicks	July 2, 1982	June 30, 1983	11 months, 28 days	
9		Steven C. Beering	July 1, 1983	August 13, 2000	17 years, 1 month, 12 days	
10		Martin C. Jischke	August 14, 2000	July 15, 2007	6 years, 11 months, 1 day	
11		France A. Córdova	July 16, 2007	June 30, 2012	4 years, 11 months, 14 days	
acting		Timothy Sands	July 1, 2012	January 14, 2013	6 months, 13 days	
12		Mitchell E. Daniels	January 14, 2013	December 31, 2022	9 years, 11 months, 17 days	
13		Mung Chiang	January 1, 2023	June 30, 2026	3 years, 10 months and 10 days	
acting		Mitchell E. Daniels	July 1, 2026	Present	4 months and 10 days	
14		Jay B. Silveria	takes office February 1, 2027			

† - died in office.
