= John W. Hicks =

American agricultural economist (1921–2002)

Acting President of the Purdue University System
- In office July 2, 1982 – June 30, 1983
- Preceded by: Arthur G. Hansen
- Succeeded by: Steven C. Beering

Personal details
- Born: December 2, 1921
- Died: December 20, 2002 (aged 81)

John William Hicks (December 2, 1921 – December 20, 2002) served as acting president of Purdue University from 1982 to 1983. An agricultural economist, he was executive assistant to the university's presidents Frederick L. Hovde and Arthur G. Hansen from 1955 to 1982. Purdue's Undergraduate Library was renamed in his honor on April 21, 1990.

Hicks was born in Sydney, Australia. He earned a master's degree and a doctorate from Purdue University in 1948 and 1950, respectively. He moved with his family to New Rochelle, New York and attended a campus of the University of Massachusetts for his undergraduate studies. He served in the United States Army Air Forces during World War II.

Hicks was married to Elizabeth Johnston. The two had eight children, and fourteen grandchildren.

Academic offices
Preceded by Arthur G. Hansen	Acting President of Purdue University; 1982–1983	Succeeded by Steven C. Beering
