= Asa Mahan =

American Congregational minister (1799–1889)

The Reverend Asa Mahan
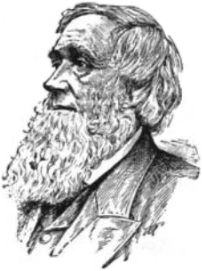

President of Adrian College
- In office 1859 – 1873
- Preceded by: Office established

President of Cleveland University
- In office 1850 – 1852
- Preceded by: Office established
- Succeeded by: School closed

President of Oberlin Collegiate Institute
- In office 1835 – 1850
- Preceded by: Office established
- Succeeded by: Charles Grandison Finney

Personal details
- Born: November 9, 1799 Vernon, New York, U.S.
- Died: April 4, 1889 (aged 89) Eastbourne, England, U.K.
- Spouse(s): Mary Hartwell Dix (m. 1828; d. 1863); Mary E. Munsell (m. 1866)
- Children: Anna J. (1829–1911); Lucy D. (1831–1880); Theodore S. (1834–1863); Mary K. (1837–1924); Sarah S. (b. 1840); Elizabeth M. (b. 1843); Almira (b. 1846)
- Education: Hamilton College; Andover Theological Seminary
- Profession: Congregational Minister, college professor, academic administrator
- Website: Asa Mahan Presidential Papers, 1764-1995

Asa Mahan (/ˈeɪsə məˈhæn/; November 9, 1799 – April 4, 1889) was an American Congregational minister and educator and the first president of both the Oberlin Collegiate Institute (later Oberlin College) and Adrian College. He described himself as "a religious teacher and an instructor of youth".

== Biography ==
=== Career ===
Asa Mahan graduated from Hamilton College in 1824, and from Andover Theological Seminary in 1827. On November 10, 1829, he was ordained pastor of the Congregational church in Pittsford, New York, and in 1831 he was called to the pastorate of a Presbyterian church in Cincinnati, Ohio. He was a trustee of the new Lane Seminary, the only Lane administrator to vote in favor of the students' right to debate "immediatism", setting all slaves free immediately, versus colonialism, sending them to Africa. When a majority of Lane's students resigned as a group (the Lane Rebels), to end up at Oberlin a year later (1835), he did as well. At the students' insistence he was appointed President of the newly founded Oberlin Collegiate Institute, simultaneously serving as the chair of intellectual and moral philosophy (ethics) and professor of theology. The students also insisted, as a condition of their enrollment, that Oberlin admit students of all races, which Mahan's liberal views towards abolitionism and anti-slavery helped get the approval of the reluctant trustees. Oberlin was the second college to admit African Americans; the first was the Oneida Institute, a short-lived predecessor of Oberlin, which did not admit women.

"Historians...are in disagreement over the merits of succeeding quarrels between Mahan and the Oberlin faculty." Mahan was blunt and tactless, because he was so committed to reform. With hindsight, we can see how Mahan was ahead of the faculty: advocating for female equality, and defending those who were for the "immediatist" abolitionism (setting all slaves free immediately) of William Garrison.

In 1844 the faculty "decided they had had enough of him" and attempted to have him removed, but "influential colleagues", including Finney, prevented it. Another attempt in 1847 also failed. In 1850, this time with Finney's support, the faculty prepared a "searing ten-count indictment" of his "overbearing behavior". He resigned. In his place, famed abolitionist and preacher Charles Finney (already an Oberlin professor) was made president of Oberlin College. Heartbroken, Mahan moved to Cleveland, Ohio, and participated in the founding of Cleveland University, located in the Tremont District of the city, where he was chosen president of the school and also professor of mental and moral philosophy. However, the school had trouble attracting students and went bankrupt after only a few years, and Mahan was forced out.

But ye are a chosen generation, a royal priesthood, an holy nation, a peculiar people; that ye should shew forth the praises of him who hath called you out of darkness into his marvellous light. (1 Peter 2.9, King James translation, quoted by Mahan at the beginning of Out if Darkness into Light.)

=== Pastoral work ===
In 1855, he resumed pastoral work, and had charge of Congregational parishes at Jackson, Michigan in 1855-57 and at Adrian, Michigan in 1857–60. In 1859 Mahan became the first President of Adrian College, a position he still held in 1873. Mahan moved to Eastbourne, England in 1874, where he published frequently until his death on April 4, 1889.

== Personal life ==
Mahan married Mary Hartwell Dix (died 1863) in 1828, with whom he had seven children. In 1866, he remarried to Mary E. Munsell (1814-1894). His daughter, Mary, married Charles Reynolds, who became a member of the Wisconsin State Assembly.

Mahan was a "hearty supporter" of the vegetarian Graham diet, and was President of the Oberlin Physiological Society, which supported it. The diet was unpopular at Oberlin.

== Works ==
Mahan wrote two autobiographical books:

- Mahan, Asa (1876). Out of darkness into light, or, The hidden life made manifest through facts of observation and experience : facts elucidated by the word of God. Boston.
- Mahan, Asa (1882). Autobiography, intellectual, moral and spiritual. London.

Mahan was an active advocate of the religious view known as Christian Perfection, and published Scripture Doctrine of Christian Perfection (2nd edition, 1839) on the subject. His other works include:

- System of Intellectual Philosophy (2nd edition, 1847)
- Doctrine of the Will (1845)
- The True Believer: his Character, Duties, and Privileges
- The Science of Moral Philosophy
- Election and the Influence of the Holy Spirit
- Modern Mysteries Explained and Exposed. In Four Parts. I. Clairvoyant Revelations of A. J. Davis. II. Phenomena of Spiritualism Explained and Exposed. III. Evidence that the Bible Is Given by Inspiration of the Spirit of God, as compared with the Evidence That These Manifestations Are from the Spirits of Men. IV. Clairvoyant Revelations of Emanuel Swedenborg. Boston, 1855. This book received a hostile review and rebuttal, focusing on Andrew Jackson Davis, published as an 80-page pamphlet.
- The Science of Logic
- Science of Natural Theology
- Theism and Anti-Theism in their relations to Science
- The Phenomena of Spiritualism scientifically Explained and Exposed
- A critical history of the late American War (1877)
- A System of Mental Philosophy
- Critical History of Philosophy
- Out of darkness into light, or, The hidden life made manifest through facts of observation and experience: facts elucidated by the word of God (1888)
- "Misunderstood Texts of Scripture"
- The Baptism of the Holy Ghost, to which is added The Enduement of Power by Charles G. Finney). (Cheap edition, London, 1876).

== Archival material ==
The Asa Mahan Presidential Papers, 1764-1995 are located in the Oberlin College Archives.
