= Henry W. Marshall =

American journalist

Henry Wright Marshall
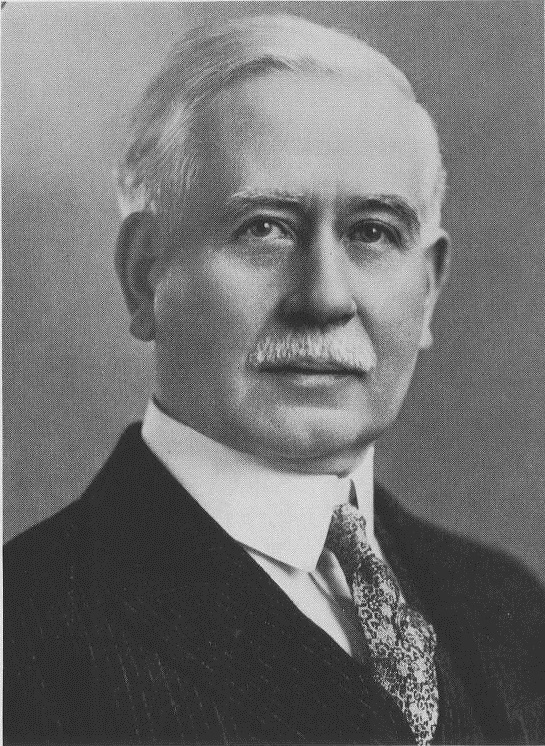

Acting President of Purdue University
- In office July 17, 1921 – September 1, 1922
- Preceded by: Winthrop E. Stone
- Succeeded by: Edward C. Elliott

Personal details
- Born: January 29, 1865 Greene County, Ohio, United States
- Died: January 31, 1951 (aged 86) Lafayette, Indiana, United States
- Party: Republican
- Occupation: Businessperson, politician, and educator

Henry Wright Marshall Sr. (January 29, 1865 – January 31, 1951) was an American businessperson and politician. He is known for being the founder of the Lafayette (Indiana) Journal & Courier, Speaker of the Indiana House of Representatives, and acting president of Purdue University.

== Biography ==
=== Youth and business career ===
Marshall was born near Springfield, Ohio, and graduated in 1883 from Union Business College at Lafayette, Indiana. He began his business career as a stationery salesman. From the 1890s to the 1920s, Marshall was a founder or president of companies related to bridge construction, road paving, public utilities, railroads, and grain storage. As president of the Western Construction Company, Marshall was indicted in 1908 when an employee overcharged the city of Indianapolis for a paving job.

He purchased and consolidated the Lafayette Sunday Times and the Lafayette Morning Journal in 1914. In 1920 he merged them with the Lafayette Daily Courier to form the Journal & Courier, which remains the main newspaper of the Lafayette area. The Evansville Courier was another Indiana newspaper company that he bought that year; he sold it to Mayor Benjamin Bosse a few months later. Marshall continued to be the Journal & Courier's editor-in-chief for the rest of his life, although he eventually passed the title of publisher on to his son, Henry Marshall Jr.

=== Politics and other activities ===
A member of the Republican Party, Marshall served in the Indiana House of Representatives from 1899 until 1905. In the 1903 legislative session he was that chamber's speaker. Following his time in the legislature, Marshall continued to be active in state politics and was a delegate to state and national party conventions. In 1932 Marshall led a group that convinced the Indiana Republican convention to support the repeal of the Eighteenth Amendment to the United States Constitution, which had prohibited the sale of alcoholic beverages.

In 1921, Marshall was appointed to the board of trustees of Purdue University. The university's president, Winthrop Stone, died in a mountain-climbing accident a few months later, and Marshall was chosen to act as president until a successor could be found. Marshall considered this twelve-month period to be a time of crisis and refused to accept any payment for his services.

Chicago's International Livestock Exposition first elected Marshall as their president in 1933, after the retirement of John Clay from the position. They re-elected him sixteen times and he resigned in 1949. By the time of his death in 1951, Marshall owned 6,000 acres (2,400 ha) of farm land near his home in Lafayette, Indiana.
