= Cleveland University =

Coordinates: 41.4804°N 81.6846°W

Cleveland University was a short-lived university in the Tremont neighborhood of Cleveland, Ohio, United States. It was founded in 1851 by Asa Mahan the then-recently resigned president of nearby Oberlin College. (See also William Case.) It is notable for having been the first institution of higher education in the city of Cleveland, and for briefly being a "rival" institution to Oberlin College.

== History ==
Asa Mahan had served as the first president of Oberlin College, but was forced to resign his position in 1850 due to clashes with the faculty. Meanwhile, in Cleveland, prominent locals such as governor William Slade, Jr. along with Thyrza Pelton and John Giles Jennings bought up 275 acres (1.11 km^{2}) of land from local farmers with the intent of creating a new university; however, most of this land would later be sold off to raise funds for the school. Ahaz Merchant, Mayor Samuel Starkweather and Richard Hilliard were listed as trustees, and a street grid was laid out, which remains intact to this day. The streets were named similarly to those in Oberlin, and included a Professor Avenue and a College Avenue, though Mahan also named Literary Road, Jefferson Road and University Avenue. The first building was built on the corner of College and University, which remains intact today, and the president's house was built as well. There were plans that were never realized including a female seminary, an orphanarium, and an old folks' home. Like at Oberlin, Mahan intended the newly founded Cleveland University to be both coed and open to all races.

Bringing students from Oberlin with him, Mahan intended to teach at Cleveland University with his own unique religious philosophies, for which he had felt he was expelled from Oberlin. Classes began in fall 1850 and the school was officially chartered on March 5, 1851.

After a full year of operation, eight degrees were awarded in May 1852. Ultimately, Cleveland University would graduate only 11 students during its existence. After clashes with the trustees and faculty, Asa Mahan resigned from the presidency in December 1852, and the school would close by the end of that academic year.

== Building history ==
The buildings from Cleveland University were razed by 1917. After several years of vacancy, local Cleveland teacher Ransom F. Humiston founded a private coeducational secondary school on the property, called The Humiston Institute or the Cleveland Institute. The Humiston Institute was an early private school intended to offer a superior education superior to that available at the Cleveland public schools.

The Humiston Institute closed ten years later, in 1868, and the property was taken over by what was then known as the Western Homeopathic College, founded by Benjamin L. Hill.

When the Western Homeopathic College closed, the Cleveland University building went through various incarnations as a factory and secondary school. Currently the buildings are still visible today, and the area is home to many galleries, bars and restaurants.

== See also ==
- Emerson E. White, Cleveland University alumnus and 3rd president of Purdue University
