= 60th Indiana Infantry Regiment =

60th Regiment Indiana Infantry
- Active: February 19, 1862 – March 11, 1865
- Country: United States
- Allegiance: Union
- Branch: Infantry
- Engagements: Battle of Munfordville; Yazoo Pass Expedition; Battle of Chickasaw Bayou; Battle of Arkansas Post; Battle of Port Gibson; Battle of Champion Hill; Siege of Vicksburg, May 19 & 22 assaults Jackson Expedition; Bayou Teche Campaign; Battle of Bayou Bourbeux; Red River Campaign

The 60th Regiment Indiana Infantry was an infantry regiment that served in the Union Army during the American Civil War.

== Service ==
The 60th Indiana Infantry was organized at Evansville and Indianapolis, Indiana, beginning February 19, 1862, and mustered in for a three-year enlistment on March 21, 1862.

The regiment was attached to garrison of Munfordville, Kentucky, Department of the Ohio, to September 1862. Reorganizing Indianapolis, Indiana, to November 1862. 1st Brigade, 10th Division, Right Wing, XIII Corps, Department of the Tennessee, to December 1862. 1st Brigade, 1st Division, Sherman's Yazoo Expedition, to January 1863. 1st Brigade, 10th Division, XIII Corps, Army of the Tennessee, to August 1863. 1st Brigade, 4th Division, XIII Corps, Department of the Gulf, to June 1864. District of LaFourche, Department of the Gulf, to December 1864. District of Southern Alabama, Department of the Gulf, to February 1865. 1st Brigade, 2nd Division, Reserve Corps, Military Division West Mississippi, February 1865. 1st Brigade, 2nd Division, XIII Corps, Military Division West Mississippi, February 1865.

The 60th Indiana Infantry mustered out of service on March 11, 1865.

== Detailed service ==
Duty at Camp Morton, Indianapolis, Indiana, guarding prisoners February 22 to June 20, 1862. Left Indiana for Louisville, Kentucky, June 20; then moved to Munfordville, Kentucky, and duty there until September. Siege of Munfordville, September 14–17, 1862. Seven companies captured September 17, paroled, and ordered to Indianapolis. Three companies which escaped capture were detached and guarded the railroad bridge over the Rolling Fork River, near Lebanon; also ordered to Indianapolis. Regiment reorganized at Indianapolis to November. Ordered to Memphis, Tennessee, and duty there until December 20. Sherman's Yazoo Expedition December 20, 1862, to January 3, 1863. Expedition from Milliken's Bend, Louisiana, to Dallas Station and Delhi December 25–26. Chickasaw Bayou December 26–28. Chickasaw Bluff December 29. Expedition to Arkansas Post, Arkansas, January 3–10, 1863. Assault and capture of Fort Hindman, Arkansas Post, January 10–11. Moved to Young's Point, Louisiana, January 17. Expedition to Greenville, Mississippi, and Cypress Bend, Arkansas, February 14–29. Duty at Young's Point and Milliken's Bend until April. Movement on Bruinsburg and turning Grand Gulf April 25–30. Battle of Port Gibson May 1. Battle of Champion Hill May 16. Siege of Vicksburg, Mississippi, May 18-July 4. Assaults on Vicksburg May 19 and 22. Advance on Jackson, Mississippi, July 4–10. Siege of Jackson July 10–17. Moved to New Orleans, Louisiana, August 24. Expedition to New and Amite Rivers September 24–29. Bayou Teche Campaign October 3-November 30. Action at Grand Coteau November 3. Moved to Algiers December 13, then to Texas December 18. Duty at Du Crow's Point and Pass Cavallo until March 1864. Moved to Algiers, Louisiana, then to Alexandria, Louisiana. Red River Campaign April 26-May 20. Retreat to Morganza May 13–20. Duty at Thibodeaux until November, and at Algiers until February 24, 1865. Veterans and recruits were transferred to the 26th Indiana Infantry, February 24.

== Casualties ==
The regiment lost a total of 213 men during service; 2 officers and 43 enlisted men killed or mortally wounded, 3 officers and 165 enlisted men died of disease.

== Commanders ==
- Colonel Richard Owen
- Colonel Augustus Goelzer

== See also ==
- List of Indiana Civil War regiments
- Indiana in the Civil War
