= Eon Mountain =

Mountain on Alberta/British Columbia border in Canada

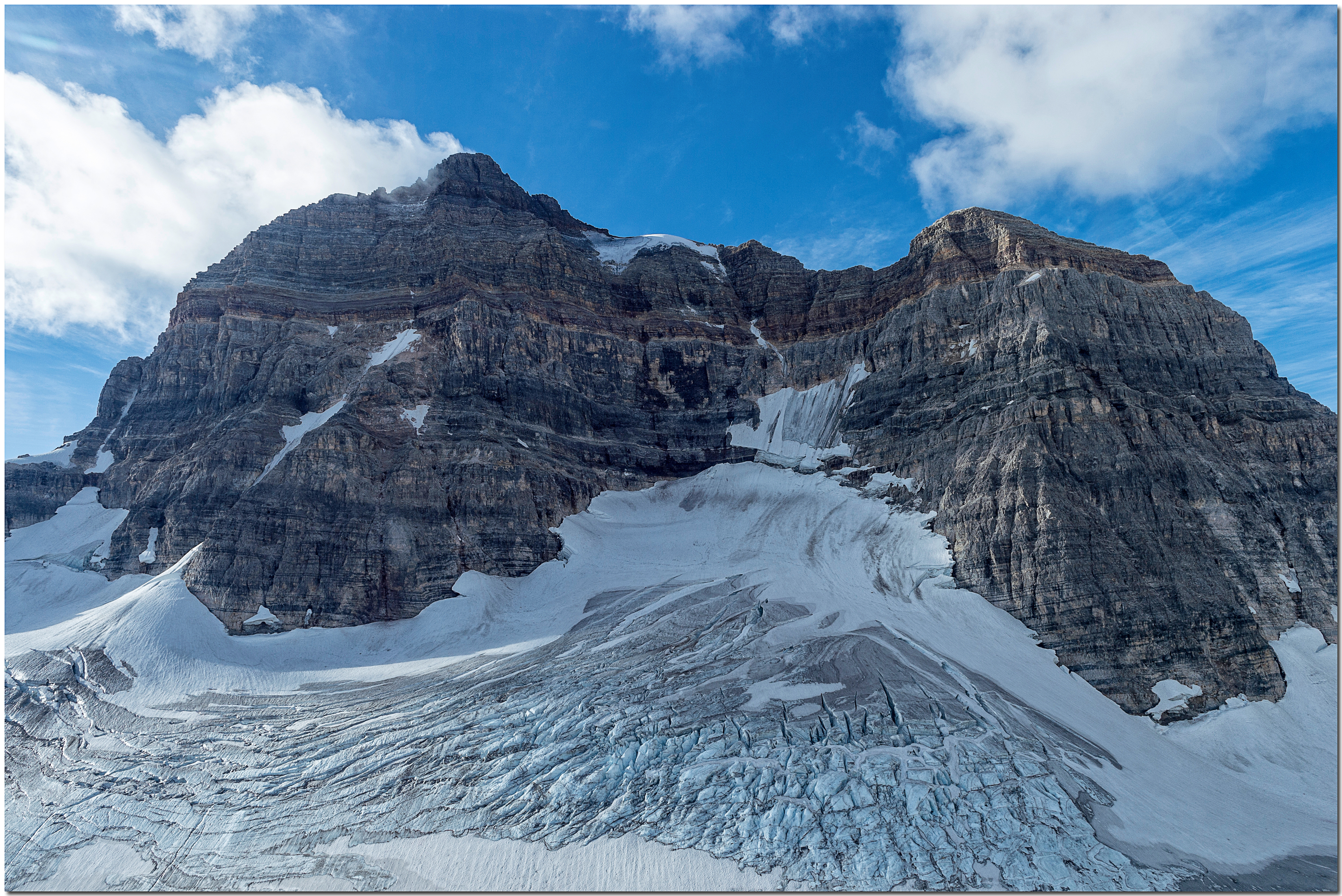
- Aerial view of north aspect

Highest point
- Elevation: 3,305 m (10,843 ft)
- Prominence: 558 m (1,831 ft)
- Parent peak: Lunette Peak (3428 m)
- Listing: Mountains of Alberta; Mountains of British Columbia
- Coordinates: 50°50′06″N 115°37′27″W

Geography
- Location within Alberta Location within British Columbia Location within Canada
- Interactive map of Eon Mountain
- Country: Canada
- Provinces: Alberta and British Columbia
- District: Kootenay Land District
- Protected area: Banff National Park
- Parent range: Park Ranges
- Topo map: NTS 82J13 Mount Assiniboine

Climbing
- First ascent: 1921 Winthrop E. Stone

Eon Mountain is located just south of Mount Assiniboine and straddles the Continental Divide marking the Alberta-British Columbia border. It is Alberta's 41st-highest peak, and the 53rd-highest peak in British Columbia. It was named in 1901 by James Outram. Originally adopted as Mount Eon in 1928 it was later changed to Eon Mountain in October 1957.

The first ascent of Eon was made on July 17, 1921, by Winthrop E. Stone, then President of Purdue University, who fell to his death shortly after reaching the summit. Stone had climbed the final chimney and then unroped on the summit. Upon returning to the chimney he stepped on a loose stone near the edge and fell. His wife was stationed at the base of the final chimney at the time. She was able to descend to 7,500 ft (2,290 m) on the south face and was rescued on July 24. On August 5, a five-man recovery team ascended the SE arête to retrieve Stone's body which was located some 850 ft (260 m) below the summit.

== Geology ==
The mountain is composed of sedimentary rock laid down during the Precambrian to Jurassic periods. Formed in shallow seas, this sedimentary rock was pushed east and over the top of younger rock during the Laramide orogeny.

== Climate ==
Based on the Köppen climate classification, Eon Mountain is located in a subarctic climate zone with cold, snowy winters, and mild summers. Temperatures can drop below −20 °C (−4 °F) with wind chill factors below −30 °C (−22 °F).

== Gallery ==
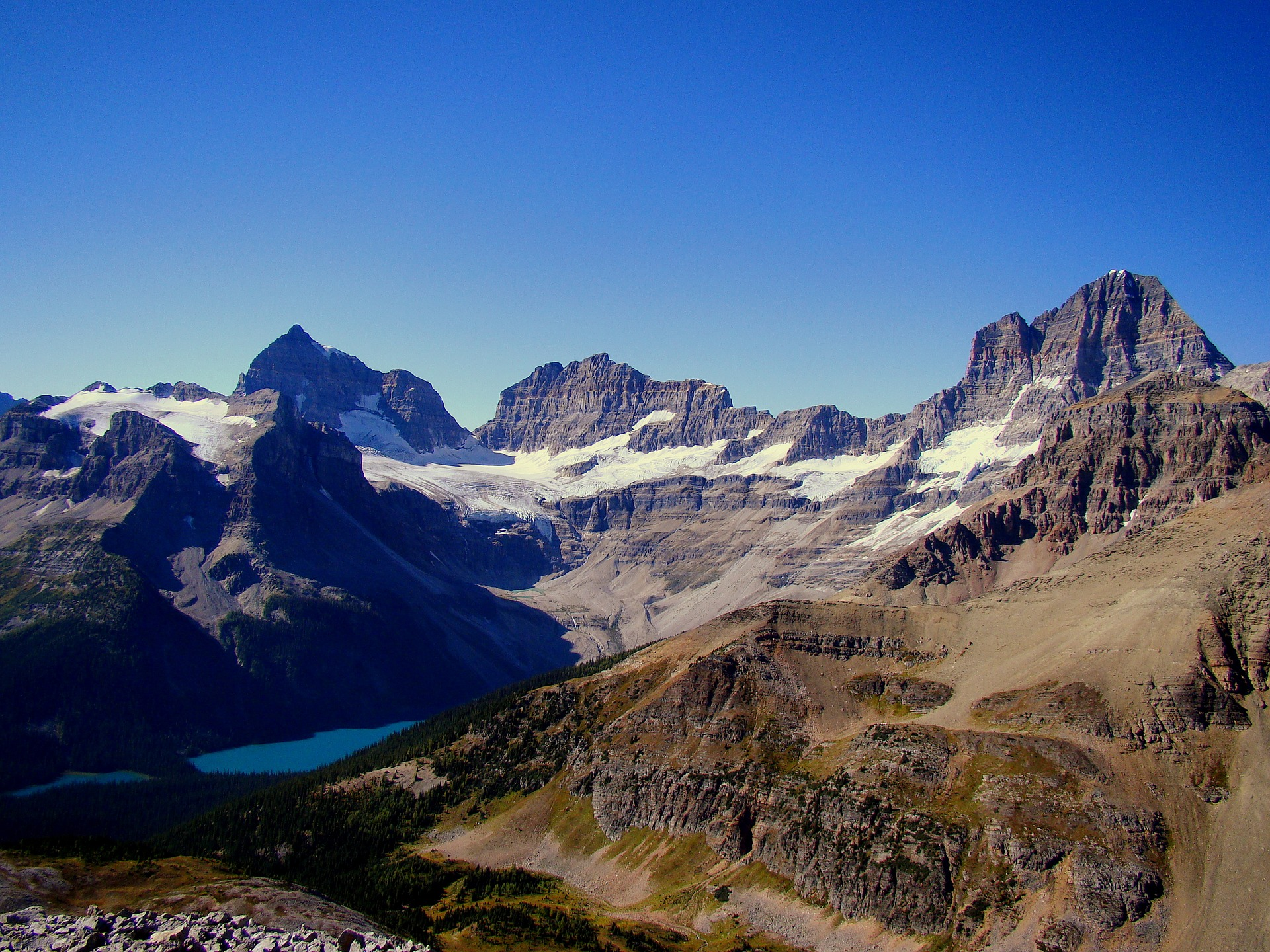
Eon Mountain to left, Aye Mountain centered, Assiniboine to right

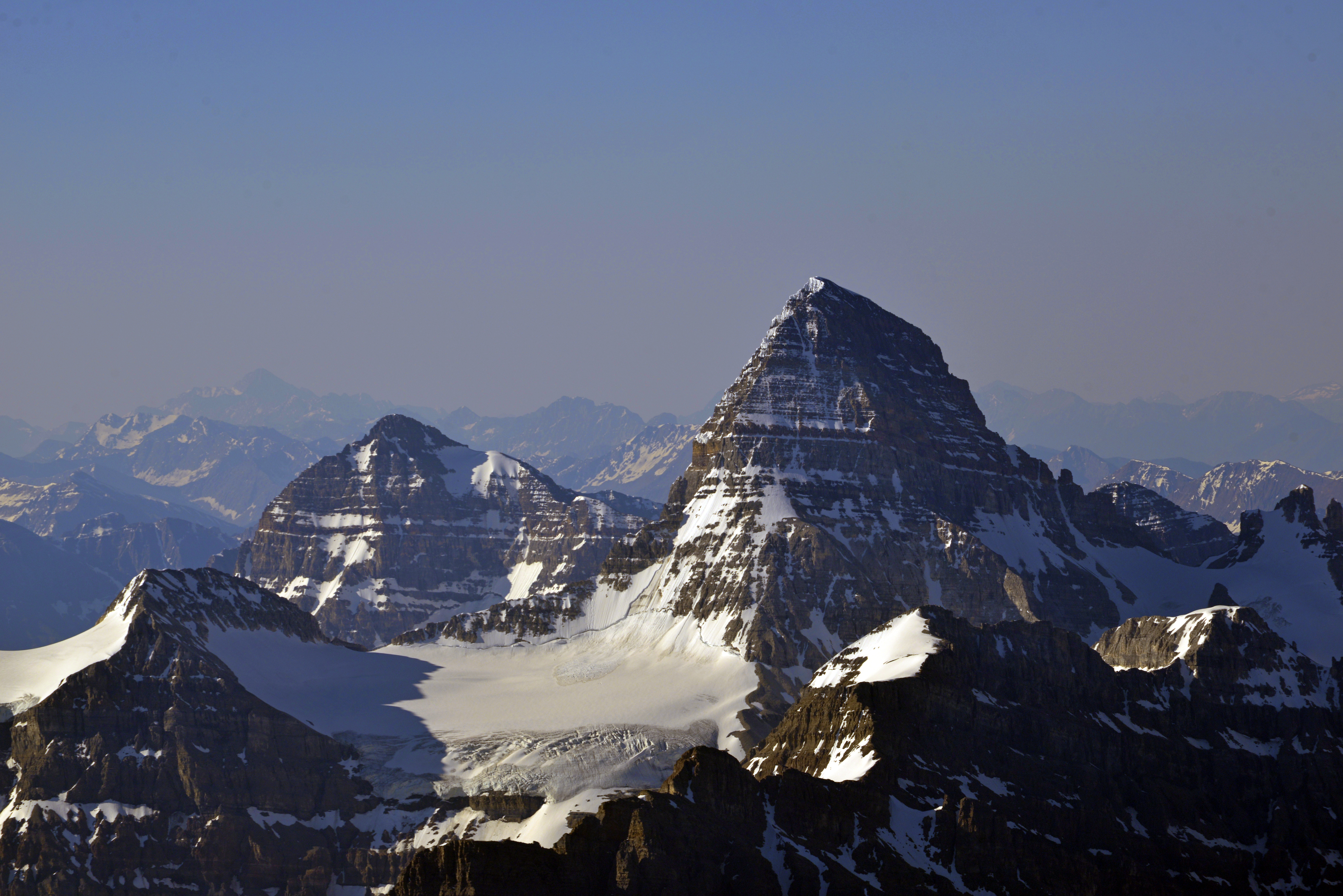
Eon Mountain to left behind Mt. Assiniboine

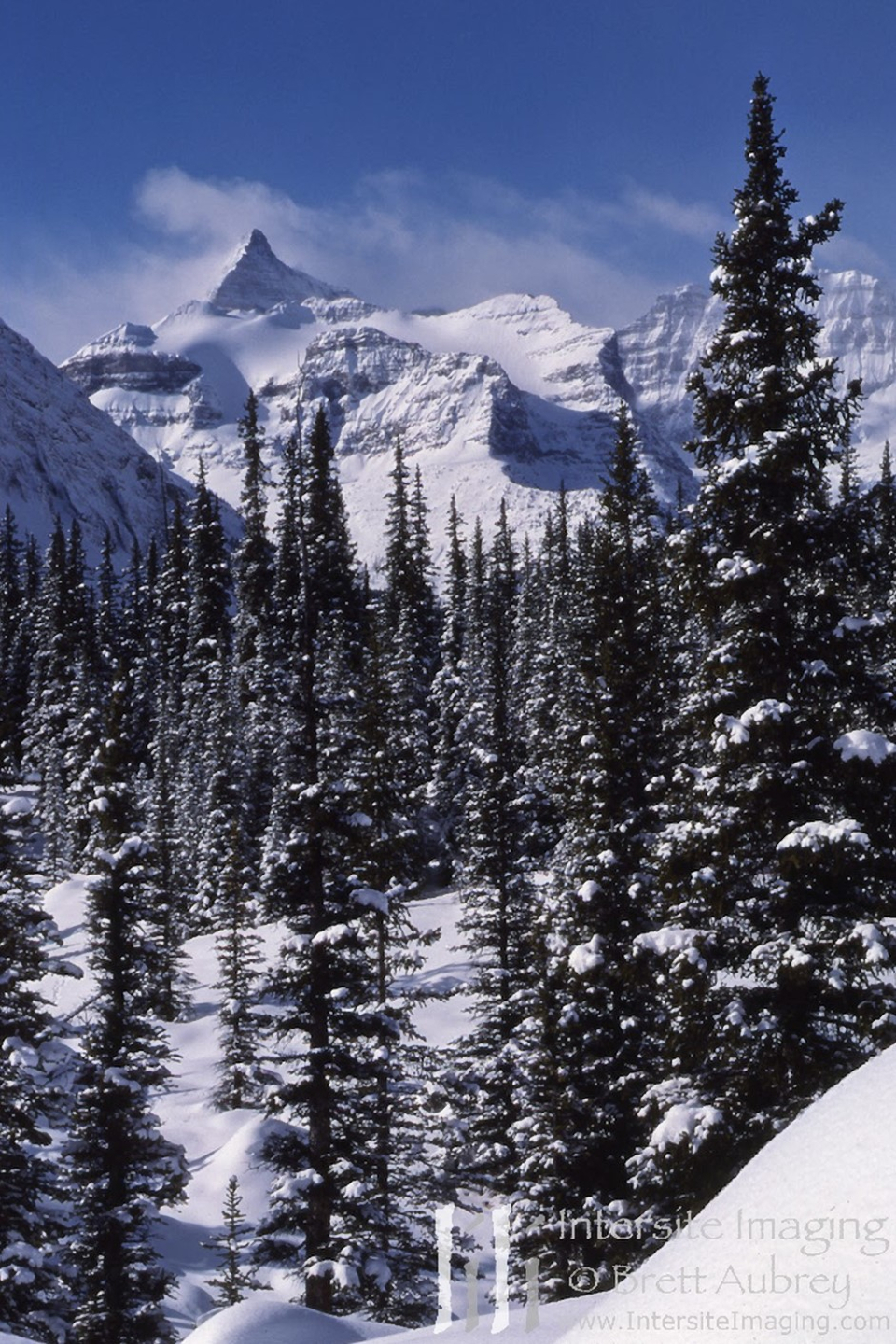
Mts. Eon (left) & Aye (behind tree) from skiout

== See also ==
- List of mountains in the Canadian Rockies
- List of peaks on the Alberta–British Columbia border
