= Frederick L. Hovde =

American academic administrator (1908–1983)

7th President of the Purdue University System
- In office 1 January 1946 – 24 June 1971
- Preceded by: Andrey A. Potter (acting)
- Succeeded by: Arthur G. Hansen

Personal details
- Born: February 7, 1908
- Died: March 1, 1983 (aged 75)

Frederick Lawson Hovde (7 February 1908 – 1 March 1983) was an American chemical engineer, researcher, educator and president of Purdue University.

Born in Erie, Pennsylvania, Hovde received his Bachelor of Chemical Engineering from the University of Minnesota, where he played on the football team. Elected to a Rhodes Scholarship, he spent three years at Oxford University where he received two degrees in chemistry. While at Oxford, he was a member of the varsity rugby football team and in 1931 he became the third American in history to win his Oxford blue in the annual Oxford-Cambridge rugby union match.

== Professional career ==
Returning to the United States in 1932, Hovde was appointed assistant director of the newly established General College of the University of Minnesota. In 1936, he went to the University of Rochester in New York, serving as assistant to the president and lecturer in chemistry.

In 1941, following the outbreak of World War II, Hovde joined the newly established National Defense Research Committee, which later became a part of the war-time Office of Scientific Research and Development. His first assignment was as head of the London Mission of the OSRD, an opportunity which he took to obtain a master's degree from Oxford University. In 1942, he returned to the National Defense Research Committee as Executive Assistant to James Bryant Conant, its chairman. In 1943, Hovde was made Chief of Rocket Ordnance Research, of the National Defense Research Committee.

== At Purdue University ==
In January 1946, he began his tenure as President of Purdue University, a position which he held until his retirement in 1971.

During the time of Hovde's presidency, over 80,000 men and women graduated from the university. Enrollment at Purdue more than quadrupled from 5,628 to 25,582 students. Its annual budget increased from $12.7 million to $136 million.

It was also during this time that Purdue established the schools of industrial engineering, materials engineering, technology, and veterinary medicine.

While at Purdue, he served on numerous government boards on scientific research, including military research. He also served as a member of the Board of Visitors to the United States Naval Academy, Board of Visitors to the Air University, Air Training Command Advisory Board, Board of Consultants to the National War College, and Board of Visitors to the United States Air Force Academy. In 1961, he served as chairman of the President-Elect's Task Force Committee on Education. From 1970 to 1973, he served on the President's Council on Physical Fitness and Sports.

Hovde served as President of the National Association of State Universities and Land-Grant Colleges (1953–1954), as vice chairman of the American Council on Education (1955–1956), and a member of the President's Committee on Education Beyond High School (1956–1957).

== Honors and awards ==
In recognition of his war services Hovde received the President's Medal for Merit and was awarded the King's Medal for Service in the Cause of Freedom by the British government.

Hovde was named a Fellow of the American Association for the Advancement of Science in 1957. He received the Exceptional Civilian Service Award from the Department of the Air Force in 1961, the Distinguished Public Service Award from the Department of the Navy in 1963, the Distinguished Service Award from the Association of the United States Army in 1963, and the Distinguished Public Service Medal from the Department of Defense in 1970.

In 1967, Hovde received the Washington Award from the Western Society of Engineers and the Gold Medal Award from the National Football Foundation and Hall of Fame. In 1968, he was awarded the National Order of the Southern Cross by the Brazilian government and the Academic Award Medal by the government of Taiwan. In 1970, he was selected by the NCAA to receive its Theodore Roosevelt Award.

Upon retirement from the presidency, he was named President Emeritus of Purdue. President Nixon attended Hovde's retirement dinner and presented him with a certificate of recognition.

In 1975, Purdue renamed the Executive Building the Frederick L. Hovde Hall of Administration.

Hovde received more than 20 honorary doctoral degrees in a variety of disciplines from colleges and university throughout the United States.

Purdue annually gives an award in Hovde's honor, the Frederick L. Hovde Award of Excellence. It is given to a member of Purdue University's faculty or staff who has displayed outstanding educational service to rural Indiana.

== Family ==
Hovde married Priscilla Boyd and they had three children, Frederick Boyd (Boyd), Jane and Linda. Frederick Boyd Hovde married Karen Sorenson and they have four children, Frederick Russell (Rick), Debra, Kristine and Sarah. Boyd practices law in Indianapolis with his son, Rick.

Preceded by: Edward C. Elliott	President of Purdue University; 1946–1971	Succeeded by: Arthur G. Hansen
