= Andrey Abraham Potter =

Purdue University president, 1945-1946

Acting President of the Purdue University System
- In office 21 December 1945 – 1 January 1946
- Preceded by: Edward C. Elliott
- Succeeded by: Frederick L. Hovde

Personal details
- Born: August 5, 1882 Vilnius, Russian Empire
- Died: November 5, 1979 (aged 97)

Andrey (Andy) Abraham Potter (August 5, 1882 – November 5, 1979) was a Russian-American mechanical engineer and educator, and the 52nd president of the American Society of Mechanical Engineers in the year 1933–34. He is known for his work in engineering and scientific education.

== Biography ==
=== Youth and education ===
Potter was born in Vilnius in Russia, now the capital of Lithuania, as son of Gregor Potter and Rivza Potter in 1882. As a child, he was musically gifted and played ocarina. After regular education in Vilna, he emigrated in 1887 at the age of fifteen to the United States, where he would become a U.S. citizen in 1906.

In 1899 at the age of 17 he entered Massachusetts Institute of Technology, where he obtained his BSc in 1903.

=== Career in education and recognition ===
After graduation in 1903, Potter started as a turbine engineer at General Electric in Schenectady, New York. In 1905 he accepted an appointment at the Kansas State University College of Agriculture as assistant professor of Mechanical Engineering. In 1913 he was also appointed Dean of Engineering and became director of the university's Engineering Experiment Station. In 1920 Potter moved to the Purdue University, where he served as Dean of Engineering until his retirement in 1953. Potter served as the thesis advisor of Maurice Zucrow, the first recipient of a PhD degree in engineering from Purdue. In the year 1945-46 he also served as president of Purdue University. Dean Potter brought Purdue Engineering to national prominence, doubling the enrollment, overseeing the construction of three new buildings, and founding three new engineering schools at Purdue University College of Engineering. In a 1977 newspaper profile on the occasion of Purdue naming a building in his honor, Potter is quoted saying:

Customers, pupils, and associates are attracted to those who by word and deed demonstrate a genuine interest in others. This human interest involves kindness, courtesy, candor, fairness, respect, understanding, frankness, optimism, and much of giving self.

In the year 1924-25 Potter was president of the American Society for Engineering Education, in 1932-33 president of the American Society of Mechanical Engineers, and in 1936-38 President of the American Engineering Council. Over the years he was awarded 10 honorary doctoral degrees. Among others he was awarded the Lamme Award in 1940, and the Cyrus Hall McCormick Gold Medal in 1953.

== Selected publications ==
- Potter, Andrey Abraham. Farm Motors: Steam and Gas Engines, Hydraulic and Electric Motors, Traction Engines, Automobiles, Animal Motors, Windmills. McGraw-Hill Book Company, 1917.
- Moyer, James Ambrose, James Park Calderwood, and Andrey Abraham Potter. Elements of engineering thermodynamics. Wiley, 1920.
- Potter, Andrey Abraham. Engineering Research as a Career. National Research Council, 1925.
- Hawkins, George Andrew, Harry Leland Solberg, and Andrey Abraham Potter. The viscosity of water and superheated steam. 1935.
- Potter, Andrey Abraham, Harry Leland Solberg, and George Andrew Hawkins. Researches in High-pressure Steam at Purdue University, 1931–1935. Purdue University, 1935.

Articles, a selection

- Remmers, H. H., Davenport, K. S., & Potter, A. A. (1946). "The best and worst teachers of engineering." Studies in Higher Education, (57), 3-17.
