= Steven C. Beering =

American university president (1932–2020)

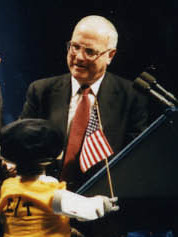
- Beering in 1987

9th President of the Purdue University System
- In office 1 July 1983 – 13 August 2000
- Preceded by: John W. Hicks (acting)
- Succeeded by: Martin C. Jischke

Personal details
- Born: Steven Claus Beering; August 20, 1932 Berlin, Weimar Republic
- Died: April 3, 2020 (aged 87) Carmel, Indiana

Steven Claus Beering (August 20, 1932 – April 3, 2020) served as president of Purdue University from 1983 to 2000. Previously, he was dean of the Indiana University School of Medicine for nine years.

During his leadership, Purdue's main campus in West Lafayette, Indiana, grew by more than 20 buildings. He replaced John W. Hicks and was succeeded by Martin C. Jischke. Beering was well known for his opposition to financial earmarks. In his honor, the former Liberal Arts Education Building (or LAEB), was renamed Beering Hall. He also founded an eponymous scholarship which provides recipients with full tuition and fees, room and board, and expenses for their undergraduate, graduate, and doctoral degrees.

Beering earned a B.S. in 1954 and an M.D. in 1959, both from the University of Pittsburgh. In May 2010, he completed a term as Chairman of the National Science Board.

Beering died on April 3, 2020, at the age of 87. He was interred in 2020 on Slayter Hill alongside his wife, Jane Beering, who preceded him in death in 2015.

Academic offices
Preceded by John W. Hicks	President of Purdue University; 1983–2000	Succeeded by Martin C. Jischke
