= Emerson E. White =

American educator

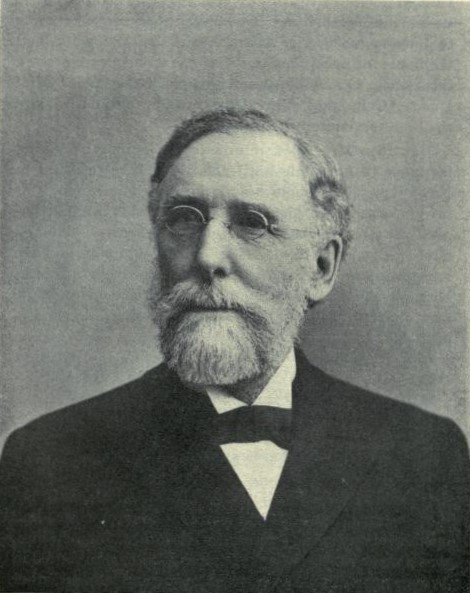

Superintendent of Cincinnati Public Schools
- In office 1886–1889

3rd President of Purdue University
- In office 30 April 1876 – 23 August 1883
- Preceded by: John S. Hougham (acting)
- Succeeded by: James H. Smart

Ohio Superintendent of Public Instruction
- In office 1863–1866

Superintendent of Portsmouth City Schools
- In office 1856–1861

Personal details
- Born: January 10, 1829 Mantua, Ohio, U.S.
- Died: October 21, 1902 (aged 73) Columbus, Ohio, U.S.
- Education: Cleveland University

Emerson Elbridge White (January 10, 1829 – October 21, 1902) was an American educator and the third president of Purdue University.

== Career ==
=== Ohio ===
Emerson White began his teaching career at the age of seventeen when he was both a student and an instructor at Twinsburg Academy in Ohio. After graduating without a degree from Cleveland University in 1851, he was the principal of a few schools in the Cleveland area before serving as superintendent in Portsmouth, Ohio, from 1856 through 1861.

White owned the Ohio Educational Monthly from 1861 through 1875. From 1863 to 1866 he advocated for laws establishing teachers' institutes and an examination board as Ohio's state school commissioner. In 1866 White and U.S. Representative James A. Garfield wrote the bill that created the United States Office of Education. This precursor to the Department of Education was intended to help state education officials collect and share data. White was elected president of the Ohio Teachers' Association in 1863, the National Superintendents' Association in 1868, the National Educational Association in 1872, and the National Council of Education in 1884 and 1885.

=== Purdue University ===
==== Reorganization ====
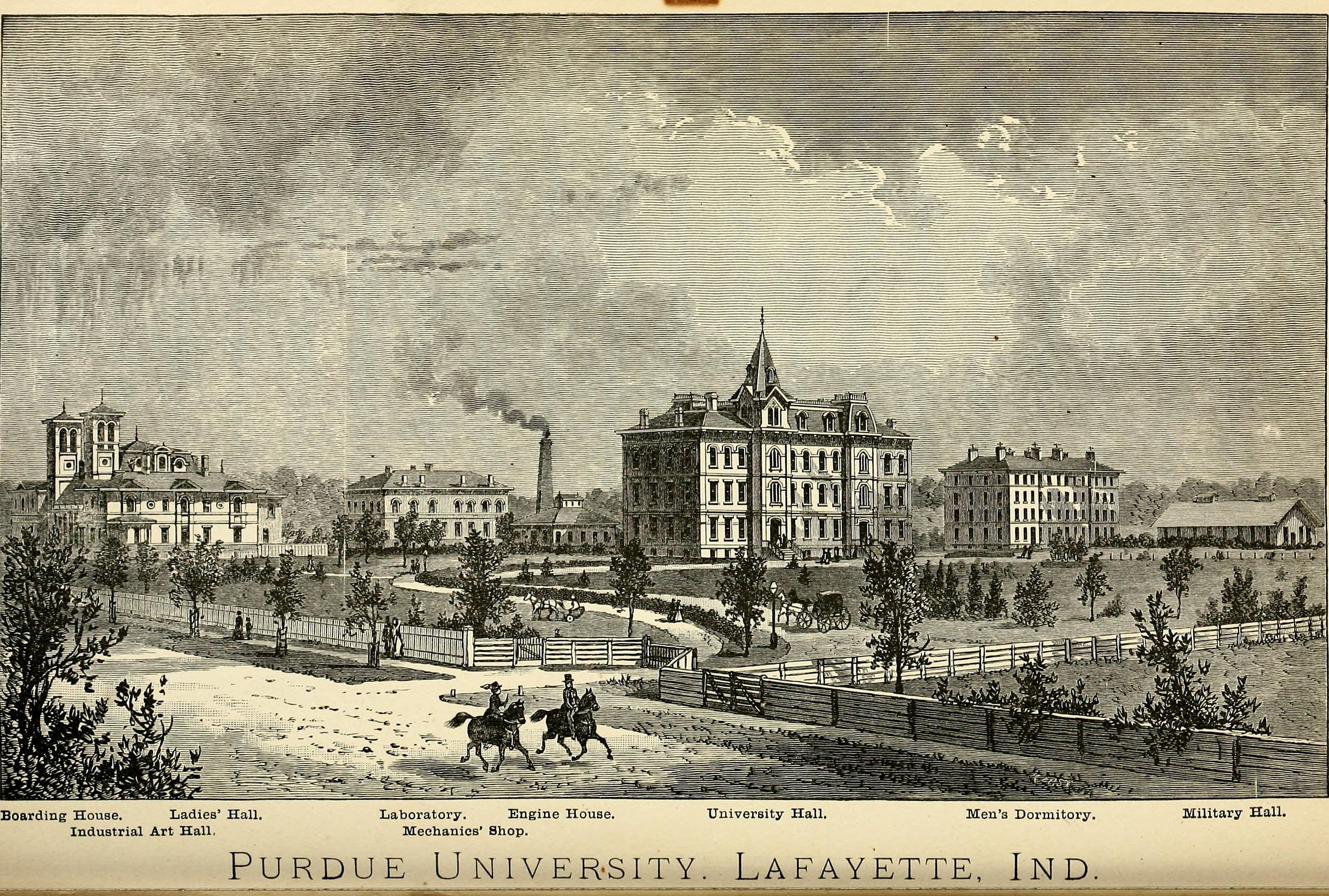
Purdue University, circa 1882

As president of Purdue University in Indiana from 1876 through 1883, White worked to reorganize the young land grant college to provide a "liberal education for the industrial classes" as described in the Morrill Act. He interpreted the Morrill Act as requiring instruction in agriculture and engineering as leading elements and instruction in languages, history, and literature as subordinate elements. While he did not believe that other fields of study were prohibited by the law, he felt that Purdue's resources were limited and should be focused on those required areas. He wanted the education to be broad enough to go beyond training for a specific job and also to prepare alumni to be good citizens.

Sixty-six students attended Purdue during White's first year (including forty-nine in its preparatory academy) and the instruction mainly consisted of fundamental science courses. White's plan reorganized Purdue's departments into a University Academy, a College of General Science, and Special Schools of Science and Technology. Among the Special Schools was the School of Mechanical Engineering, Purdue's first four-year course of study.

==== Fraternity controversy ====
Believing that fraternities distracted from Purdue's industrial focus, White issued a ban on such societies that eventually led to his resignation. In 1877 he began requiring incoming students to make a written pledge not to join a Greek-letter organization. An incoming graduate student in 1881 who was already a member of Sigma Chi refused to sign this pledge and was denied admission. The Tippecanoe County circuit court upheld this denial, but on appeal, the Indiana Supreme Court ruled that Purdue's objections to fraternities were unfounded and remanded the case. White responded by issuing new rules allowing fraternities but restricting the honors that their members could receive. When the Indiana Senate passed an 1883 appropriation bill with a rider requiring the repeal of anti-fraternity regulations, White resigned as president. The Indiana House of Representatives did not pass the appropriation bill before the legislative session ended and Purdue received no state funds that year.

=== Return to Ohio ===
After resigning from Purdue, White moved to Cincinnati and wrote textbooks about arithmetic and pedagogy. During three years as superintendent of that city's public schools beginning in 1886, White reduced the use of written tests and made teachers' recommendations the basis for promoting a student to the next grade level. He held this job during a time when Ohio state law began to officially require racial integration in schools. White eliminated the highest grade offered at Gaines High School, a high school for African Americans in Cincinnati, stopping it from produccing additional high school graduates.

== Personal life ==
White was born on January 10, 1829, in Mantua, Ohio, and died on October 21, 1902, in Columbus, Ohio.

White married Mary Ann Sabin in 1853. They had five children including West Virginia Governor Albert B. White.

Emerson White was a ruling elder in a Presbyterian church and president of the board of trustees of Lane Theological Seminary. In 1896 he traveled to Glasgow as a delegate to the Pan-Presbyterian Council.
