= James H. Smart =

American university administrator (1841–1900)

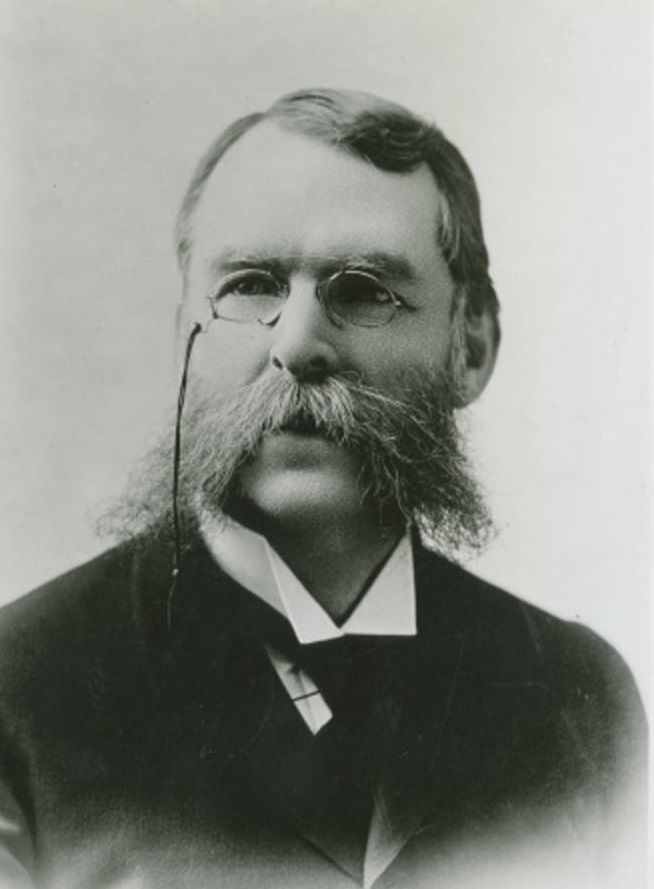

4th President of Purdue University
- In office August 23, 1883 – February 21, 1900
- Preceded by: Emerson E. White
- Succeeded by: Winthrop E. Stone

Personal details
- Born: James Henry Smart; June 30, 1841 Center Harbor, New Hampshire, US
- Died: February 21, 1900 (aged 58) Lafayette, Indiana, US
- Spouse: Mary H. Swan
- Children: Richard Addison Smart; Mary Farrington Smart
- Education: Dartmouth College (A.M. Hon.); Indiana University (LL.D.)

James Henry Smart (June 30, 1841 – February 21, 1900) was an American educator and administrator who served as the fourth president of Purdue University from August 23, 1883, until his death in 1900. An initiative of his led to the founding of the organization today known as the Big Ten Conference in 1896.

== Biography ==
=== Early life and career ===
Born in Center Harbor, New Hampshire, to Dr. William Hutchings Smart and Nancy Farrington Smart, he was initially homeschooled but eventually attended Concord High School at age 12 in 1853. After being employed as a bookkeeper, he returned to Concord at age 17 in 1858 as a temporary teacher.

In 1859 Smart began his teaching career in Sanbornton, New Hampshire. In 1863 he moved to Toledo, Ohio, to assume a principal position at an intermediate school. Shortly thereafter, he became superintendent of the Fort Wayne, Indiana, public school system.

In 1870 Smart was awarded an honorary Artium Magister degree by Dartmouth College. In 1873 he was elected president of the Indiana State Teachers Association and was appointed representative of the United States at the World's Fair in Vienna that same year. He would again be appointed representative of the United States at the 1878 World's Fair in Paris. In 1874, Smart was elected as State Superintendent of Public Instruction, a position he held until 1880 when he was elected president of the National Education Association. In 1883, he was presented a Legum Doctor degree from the Indiana University School of Law in Bloomington, Indiana.

=== Purdue University ===
Smart became president of Purdue University on August 23, 1883, succeeding Emerson E. White. That same year, the Indiana General Assembly approved funds for the erection of a new building for the School of Mechanical Engineering. Though engineering and agricultural subjects were the main interests of the university as a land-grant institution, the School of Pharmacy was established in 1884 under Smart's leadership. In 1888, a separate school of electrical engineering was organized under Dr. Louis Bell; the following year the General Assembly approved funds for a laboratory building.

The new engineering building, Heavilon Hall, was dedicated on January 19, 1894, and was completely destroyed by a fire (possibly from a boiler explosion) four days later on January 23. Smart appropriated funds to rebuild and worked with companies to replace equipment, including an experimental Schenectady Locomotive Works 4-4-0 steam engine, proclaiming, "We are looking this morning to the future, not the past... I tell you, young men, that tower shall go up one brick higher." The rebuilt Heavilon Hall was finished in December 1895, and according to campus legend, was nine bricks higher.

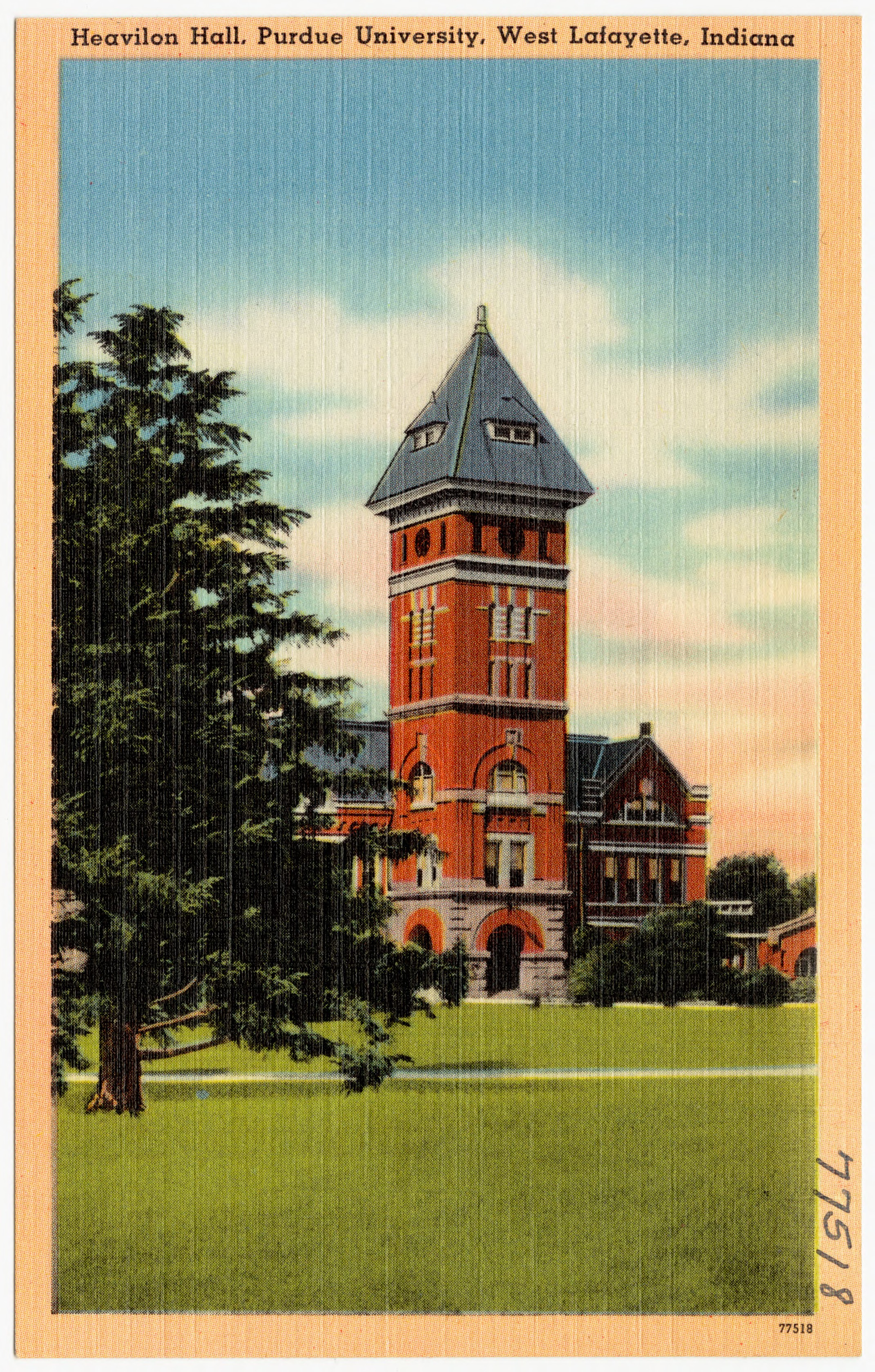
Heavilon Hall II (1895–1956)

Under Smart's leadership, the school prospered despite his failing health, with the student body growing from just under one hundred to almost one thousand. After his death, he was succeeded by university vice president Winthrop E. Stone.

=== The Big Ten Conference ===
In an initiative led by Smart, he and the presidents of the University of Chicago, University of Illinois, University of Minnesota, University of Wisconsin, Northwestern University, and Lake Forest College met on January 11, 1895, to discuss regulation of collegiate athletics. At a second meeting of the presidents (with the exception of the president of Lake Forest, who was replaced by the president of the University of Michigan) on February 8, 1896, the Intercollegiate Conference of Faculty Representatives was founded. This organization would develop into the Big Ten Conference, a Power Five conference consisting entirely of NCAA Division I FBS schools. Around the time of its founding, it was more commonly called the Western Conference, and would become to be known as the Big Nine after the University of Iowa and Indiana University joined in 1899. It would first be called the Big Ten when Michigan rejoined in 1916, (Note: Michigan was voted out in 1907 for failing to adhere to conference rules.) with Ohio State University having joined in 1912. Chicago would leave the conference in 1946 after it disbanded its athletics program and was replaced by Michigan State University in 1949. Despite subsequent enlargement to 14 teams with the additions of Pennsylvania State University, the University of Nebraska–Lincoln, the University of Maryland, and Rutgers University, the conference has continued to be known as the Big Ten. In 2022 the University of California, Los Angeles and the University of Southern California announced they would leave the Pac-12 Conference and join the Big Ten in 2024, and in 2023 the University of Washington and the University of Oregon made a similar announcement.

=== Personal life and death ===
Smart married Mary H. Swan on July 21, 1870, and had a son, Richard Addison Smart, and a daughter, Mary Farrington Smart.

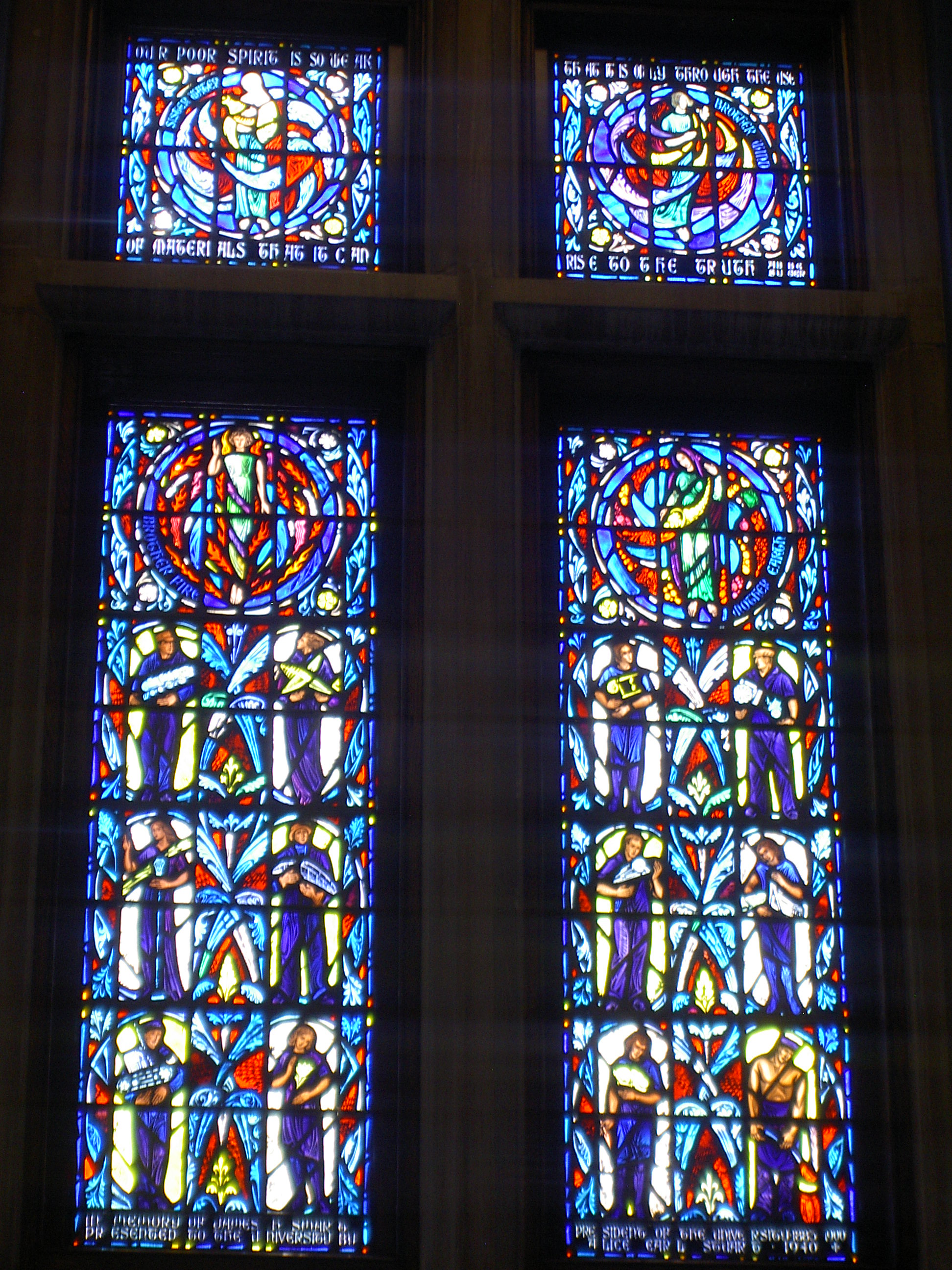
Purdue Memorial Union stained glass window dedicated in Smart's memory

Smart died of natural causes on February 21, 1900, aged 58, and is buried in Spring Vale Cemetery in Lafayette, Indiana.
