= Arthur G. Hansen =

American academic administrator (1925–2010)

Arthur Gene Hansen
- Hansen, c. 1967
- Born: February 28, 1925; Sturgeon Bay, Wisconsin, U.S.
- Died: July 5, 2010 (aged 85); Fort Myers, Florida, U.S.
- Education: Case Institute of Technology, Purdue University
- Scientific career
- Fields: Mathematics, Engineering
- Workplaces: Georgia Tech, Purdue University, Texas A&M University System, Hudson Institute
- Doctoral advisor: Gustav Kuerti

8th President of the Purdue University System
- In office 25 June 1971 - 1 July 1982
- Preceded by: Frederick L. Hovde
- Succeeded by: John W. Hicks (acting)

Arthur Gene "Art" Hansen (February 28, 1925 – July 5, 2010) was a philanthropist and former chancellor of several American universities.

== Education and early career ==
Hansen joined the United States Marine Corps Reserve and was sent to Purdue University as part of the Navy's V-12 program. He earned his bachelor's degree in electrical engineering in 1946 and returned to Purdue for his master's degree in mathematics in 1948. During this time, he also was a member of the Phi Gamma Delta fraternity.

For the next ten years, Hansen worked as an aeronautical research scientist at NASA's Lewis Flight Propulsion Laboratory, while teaching mathematics at John Carroll University and Baldwin–Wallace College. Hansen received his doctorate in mathematics from Case Institute of Technology in 1958. Hansen also holds several honorary degrees.

In 1959, Hansen joined the faculty of the University of Michigan, where he taught and wrote two textbooks about fluid mechanics, despite never having taken a formal class on the subject. He later rose to chairman of the university's mechanical engineering department.

At Georgia Tech, Hansen served as dean of engineering and, from 1969 to 1971, president of the Institute. New facilities for chemistry, civil engineering, physics, and student activities were built during his presidency.

== Later career ==
He accepted the position of president at Purdue University from 1971 to 1982, the first Purdue alumnus to do so. Following the late-1960s wave of student unrest, Hansen worked to improve the students' confidence in the university administration. He often hosted open events at his house near the campus, and in 1975 a state law added a student member to the board of trustees. Hansen responded to inflation and state budget cuts by implementing several long-term private fundraising initiatives. These included a newspaper for alumni and parents of students, a phonathon, and a President's Council of donors with which to discuss university matters. These measures helped fund the construction of new buildings for agriculture, athletics, engineering, life sciences, nursing, psychology, and technology.

In 1982, Hansen left Purdue to become chancellor of the Texas A&M University System. He was an advocate of increased minority recruitment and worked to improve the stature of Prairie View A&M University, a historically black member of the Texas A&M System. Several high-profile academics—including three Nobel laureates—joined the Texas A&M faculty during Hansen's chancellorship. The university system's mission expanded during this time to include programs to help inventors, entrepreneurs, and elementary and secondary school administrators. Hansen left this post in 1986 to become the director of research of the Hudson Institute and an educational consultant until his retirement.

After his retirement, Hansen made his home in Zionsville, Indiana, and then in Fort Myers, Florida, where he died on July 5, 2010.

== Legacy ==
The Arthur G. Hansen Life Sciences Research Building on the Purdue University campus was named in honor of Hansen. On September 24, 2002, Hansen donated US$1.8 million to Purdue for the construction of a proscenium theater named after his wife, Nancy Tucker Hansen, who was a writer and a teacher and who died the following year. The theater, part of Yue-Kong Pao Hall of Visual and Performing Arts, seats about 300 people and opened its doors in 2006.

== See also ==
- History of Georgia Tech#Rapid turnover

== Works cited ==
- Topping, Robert W. (1988). A Century and Beyond: The History of Purdue University. West Lafayette, Indiana: Purdue University Press. ISBN 0-911198-95-4.
