= Winthrop E. Stone =

American chemist and university president (1862–1921)

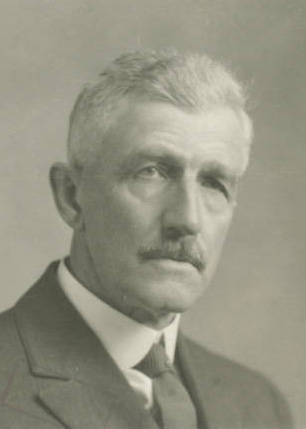

5th President of Purdue University
- In office 21 February 1900 – 17 July 1921
- Preceded by: James H. Smart
- Succeeded by: Henry W. Marshall (acting)

Personal details
- Born: June 12, 1862 Chesterfield, New Hampshire
- Died: July 17, 1921 (aged 59) Eon Mountain, Canada
- Cause of death: Mountaineering accident

Winthrop Ellsworth Stone (June 12, 1862 – July 17, 1921) was a professor of chemistry and served as the president of Purdue University from 1900 to 1921.

== Biography ==
=== Youth and career ===
Born in Chesterfield, New Hampshire, to Frederick L. Stone and Ann Butler, he was the older brother of Chief Justice Harlan Fiske Stone.

He moved to Amherst, Massachusetts in 1874, and attended Amherst High School and Massachusetts Agricultural College (now the University of Massachusetts Amherst), where he received his bachelor's degree in 1882.

Stone studied chemistry and biology at Boston University, while also serving as an assistant chemist to the Massachusetts State Agricultural Experiment Station from 1884 to 1886. He then studied at the University of Göttingen, receiving his Ph.D. there in 1888. From 1888 to 1889, he was a chemist at the Tennessee Agricultural Experiment Station.

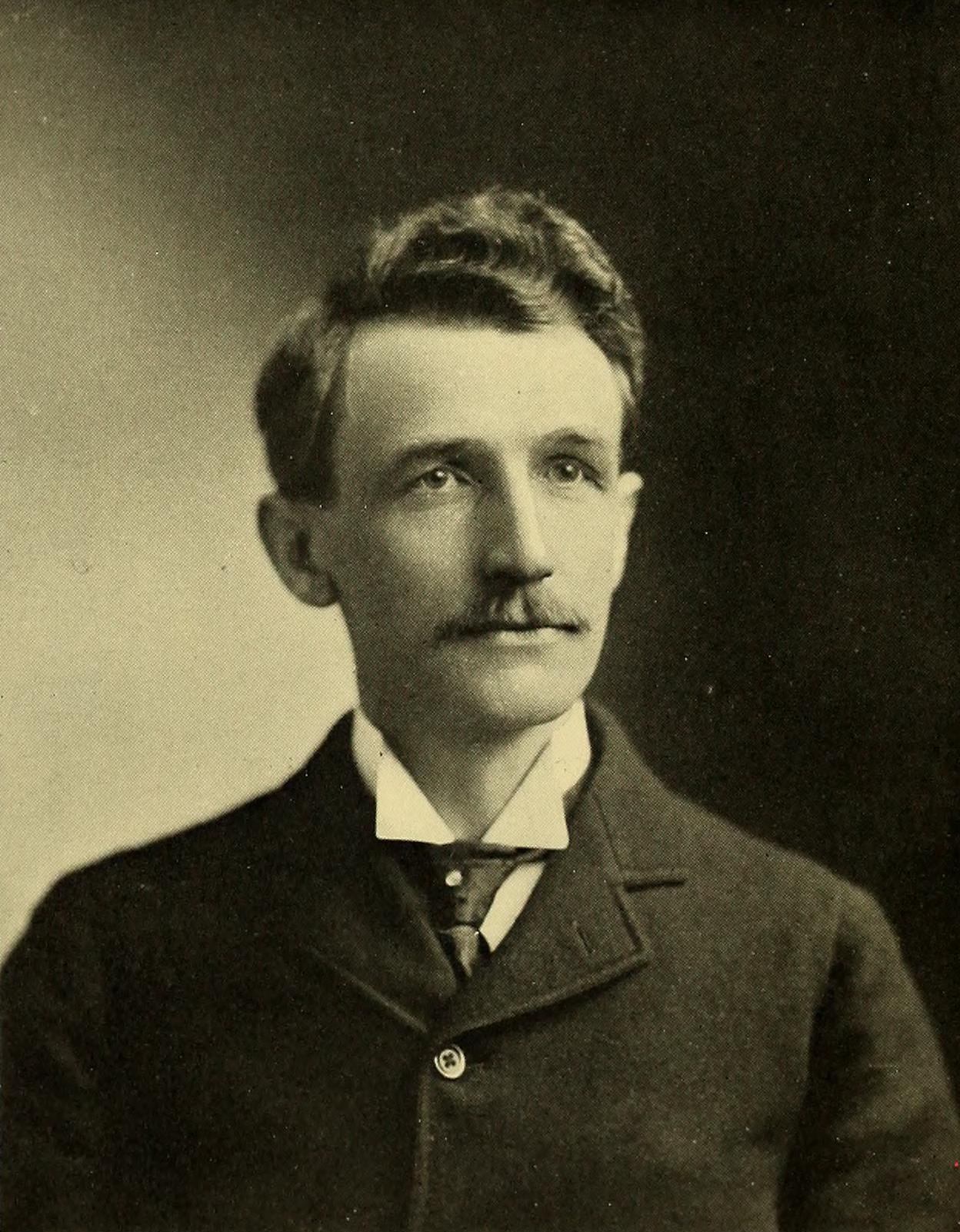
W. E. Stone, 1902

In 1889 he joined Purdue University as a professor of chemistry and conducted research in the chemistry of carbohydrates. After serving as Purdue's first vice president from 1892 to 1900, he became president of the university upon the death of James Henry Smart in 1900.

During Stone's tenure, Purdue's schools of agriculture and engineering grew rapidly. President Stone was present at one of Purdue's worst tragedies, the Purdue Wreck train collision in 1903, tending to those who were injured or dying. Stone was also instrumental in the founding of Purdue's school of medicine, which would be active from 1905 to 1908. It was absorbed into the Indiana University School of Medicine following an agreement with IU.

=== Personal life and death ===
Stone married his first wife Victoria Heitmueller of Göttingen in 1889 and they had two children, David Frederick Stone (1890–1987) and Richard Stone. Victoria abandoned the family in 1907, traveling overseas to join a religious cult.

Stone and his second wife Margaret Winter (married in 1912) enjoyed mountaineering and climbed extensively in the Canadian Rockies and the Selkirks.

On July 17, 1921, Stone fell to his death from the summit of Eon Mountain shortly after completing the peak's first ascent. Stone's death resulted in the first life insurance payout from the Teachers Insurance and Annuity Association.
