= John S. Hougham =

American university president (1821–1894)

Acting President of Purdue University
- In office 6 November 1875 – 30 April 1876
- Preceded by: Abraham C. Shortridge
- Succeeded by: Emerson E. White

Personal details
- Born: May 28, 1821
- Died: March 31, 1894 (aged 72)

John Scherer Hougham (28 May 1821 – 31 March 1894) was Purdue University's first appointed professor, first (unofficial) acting President (March 11, 1874 – June 11, 1874) after Purdue's first President Richard Dale Owen resigned on March 1, 1874, and later an official acting President (November 6, 1875 – April 30, 1876) between the administrations of Abraham C. Shortridge and Emerson E. White.

Hougham first graduated from Wabash College, Crawfordsville, Indiana, in 1846, where he was a member of Beta Theta Pi fraternity, and later after his death, the location of the John S. Hougham Manuscript Collection. He then rose to Professor of Mathematics and Natural Philosophy at Franklin College in Franklin, Indiana (1848–1867). During this time he was also a well regarded maker of scientific instruments for educational and professional use in medicine, chemistry, astronomy, and other related fields (e.g., solar compass). "Hougham Street" in Franklin, IN, adjacent to the Franklin College campus, was named to honor one of the city's most illustrious residents.

After those appointments, he was Chairman of Philosophy and Agriculture at Kansas State University (1868–1872). He then took an appointment as Professor of Physics and Industrial Mechanics, and Chairman of Agricultural Chemistry at Purdue University (1872–1876), serving in those early years of Purdue's history as an academic "handyman" – and for a time acting president during parts of 1874, '75, and '76 – to John Purdue and the founding Trustees, visiting other universities around the country in search of new ideas and faculty to bring back to his native Indiana. Around 1876, he returned to Kansas State where he spent the remaining years of his academic career.

== Additional sources ==
- Presidents of Purdue University (Acting included). [Retrieved October 28, 2022]
- Presidents of Purdue University (Acting omitted). [Retrieved October 28, 2022]
- Rittenhouse Journal index. Elgin, Richard L. 1993. "John S. Hougham and the Early History of the Solar Compass." Rittenhouse: The Journal of the American Scientific Instrument Enterprise 7(28):117-121. [Retrieved October 28, 2022]
- Davis, Michael J. 2012. "John S. Hougham's Solar Compass." Hoosier Surveyor 38(4):16-17. [Retrieved October 28, 2022] This article describes one of Hougham's solar compasses owned by the Johnson County Museum in Franklin, Indiana.
- The Hougham/Huffam Family Tree. "John Scherer Hougham - Developer of the solar compass" by RICHARD L ELGIN, PHD, LS, PE, ELGIN SURVEYING & ENGINEERING, NC. [Retrieved August 18, 2016]
