= Edward C. Elliott House =

Historic house in Wisconsin, United States

- U.S. National Register of Historic Places
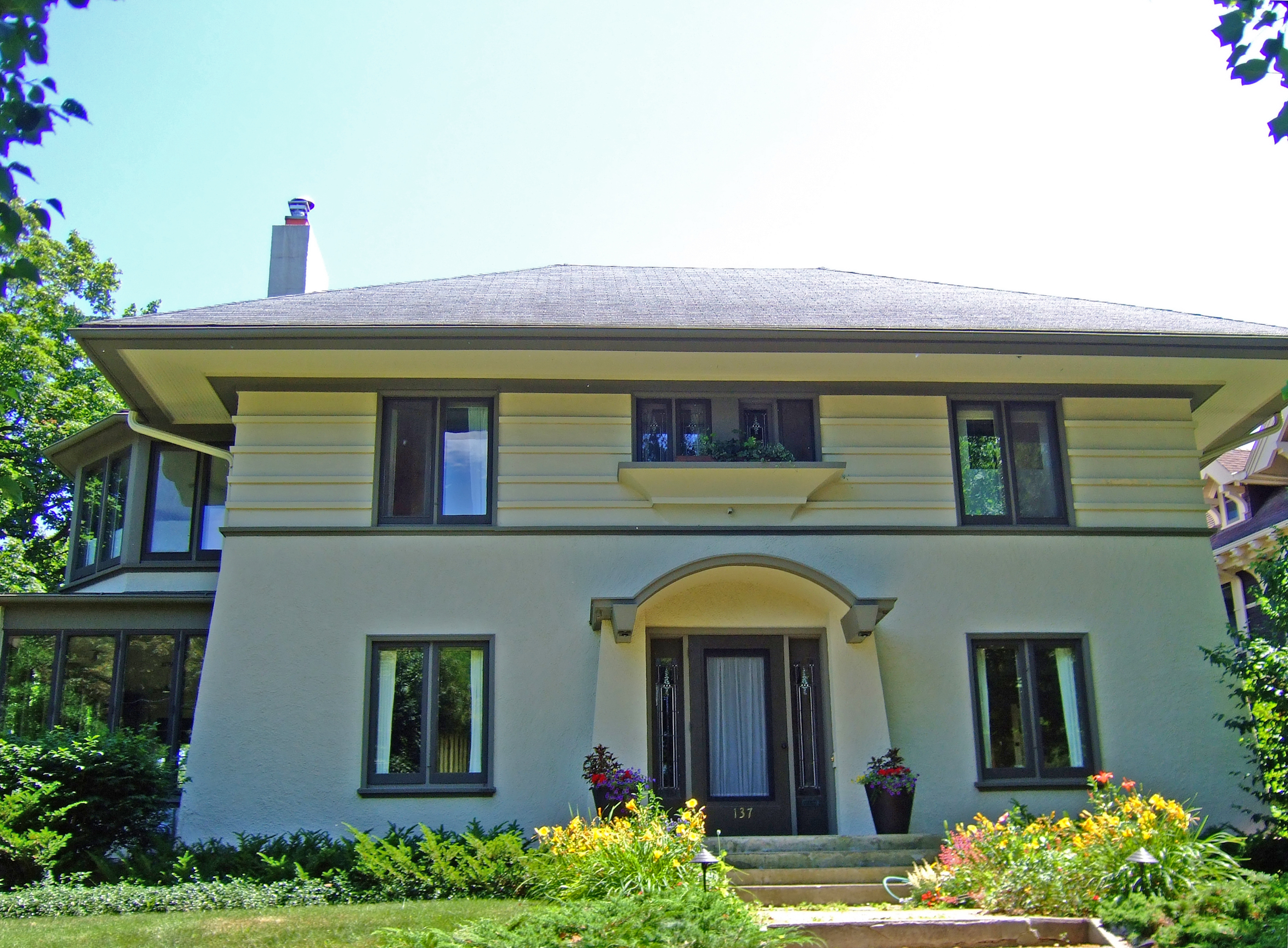
- Edward C. Elliott House
- Location: 137 N. Prospect Ave., Madison, Wisconsin
- Coordinates: 43°04′15″N 89°25′07″W
- Area: 0.1 acres (0.040 ha)
- Built: 1910
- Architect: George W. Maher/Claude & Starck
- Architectural style: Prairie School
- NRHP reference No.: 78000087
- Added to NRHP: August 11, 1978

The Edward C. Elliott House is a Prairie Style home designed by George W. Maher and built in 1910 in Madison, Wisconsin. In 1978 it was added to the National Register of Historic Places.

== History ==
Edward C. Elliott was a Professor of Education at what would become the University of Wisconsin–Madison, directing a teacher training course and involved in establishing the University of Wisconsin High School. He was later Chancellor of a precursor of the Montana University System and President of Purdue University.

Edward and his wife had this house built in 1910, when Prairie Style was around its peak of popularity. It is an example of the "compact cubical" form of Prairie Style - more or less a two story rectangle with a porch on the side. Typical Prairie features are the broad eaves, the hip roof, and the emphasis on the horizontal (belt course between the two stories and the lines on the second story), and the art glass in the front door sidelights and in some windows. Less typical of Prairie Style are the inward-tapered walls and the tapered columns that flank the doors. A two-story porch projects from one side of the house - rectangular on the first story and five-sided on the second. Inside, the front door opens to an entry with a barrel-vaulted ceiling, and the living room features a large brick fireplace.

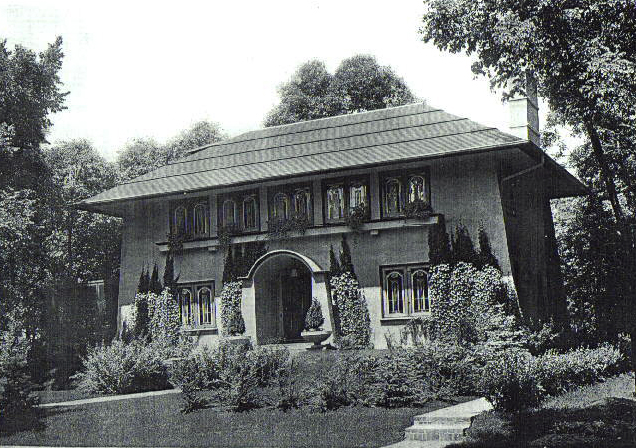
1907 Henry Schulz house in Winnetka, for comparison

It isn't entirely clear who designed the house, but the Elliotts' account books show payments to the prominent George Maher of Chicago, and the Elliotts have ties to the Winnetka area where Maher worked. The house resembles Maher's 1907 design for the Henry W. Schultz house in Winnetka. Madison's Claude and Starck were involved, but possibly only to meet a requirement of on-site supervision.

The Elliotts lived in the house from 1911 to 1916. They were followed by Ralph (Associate Professor of Political Economy at the UW) and Nellie Ness from 1916 to 1928. They were followed from 1929 to 1930 by Chester (Dean of the UW extension) and Louise Snell.

The house was listed on the National Register of Historic Places in 1978 as one of the few works of George W. Maher in Wisconsin, and as a significant example of Prairie School architecture in Madison.
