= Edward C. Elliott =

American educational researcher (1874–1960)

Edward Charles Elliott
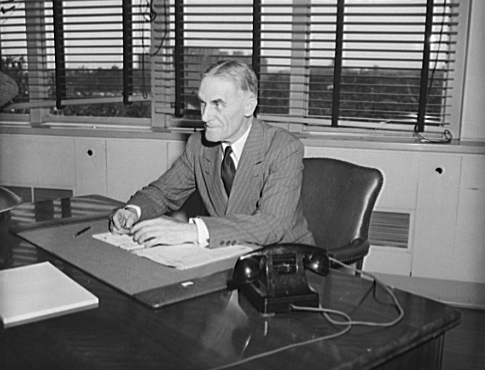

6th President of the Purdue University System
- In office 1 September 1922 – 21 December 1945
- Preceded by: Henry W. Marshall (acting)
- Succeeded by: Andrey A. Potter (acting)

Personal details
- Born: December 21, 1874 Chicago, Illinois, U.S.
- Died: June 16, 1960 (aged 85)
- Education: Teachers College, Columbia University; University of Nebraska

Edward Charles Elliott (December 21, 1874 – June 16, 1960) was an American educational researcher and administrator. He was the chancellor of the public university system of Montana from 1916 to 1922 and the president of Purdue University from 1922 to 1945.

== Early life ==
Born in Chicago, Illinois, Elliott grew up in North Platte, Nebraska, and studied chemistry at the University of Nebraska, where he received his Bachelor of Science (1895) and Master of Arts (1897) degrees. He was hired as a high school science teacher in Leadville, Colorado, and became that city's superintendent after one year. As superintendent, Elliott wrote formal rules for certifying and paying the teachers. Leadville opened its first four-year high school under Elliott's leadership.

== Educational research ==
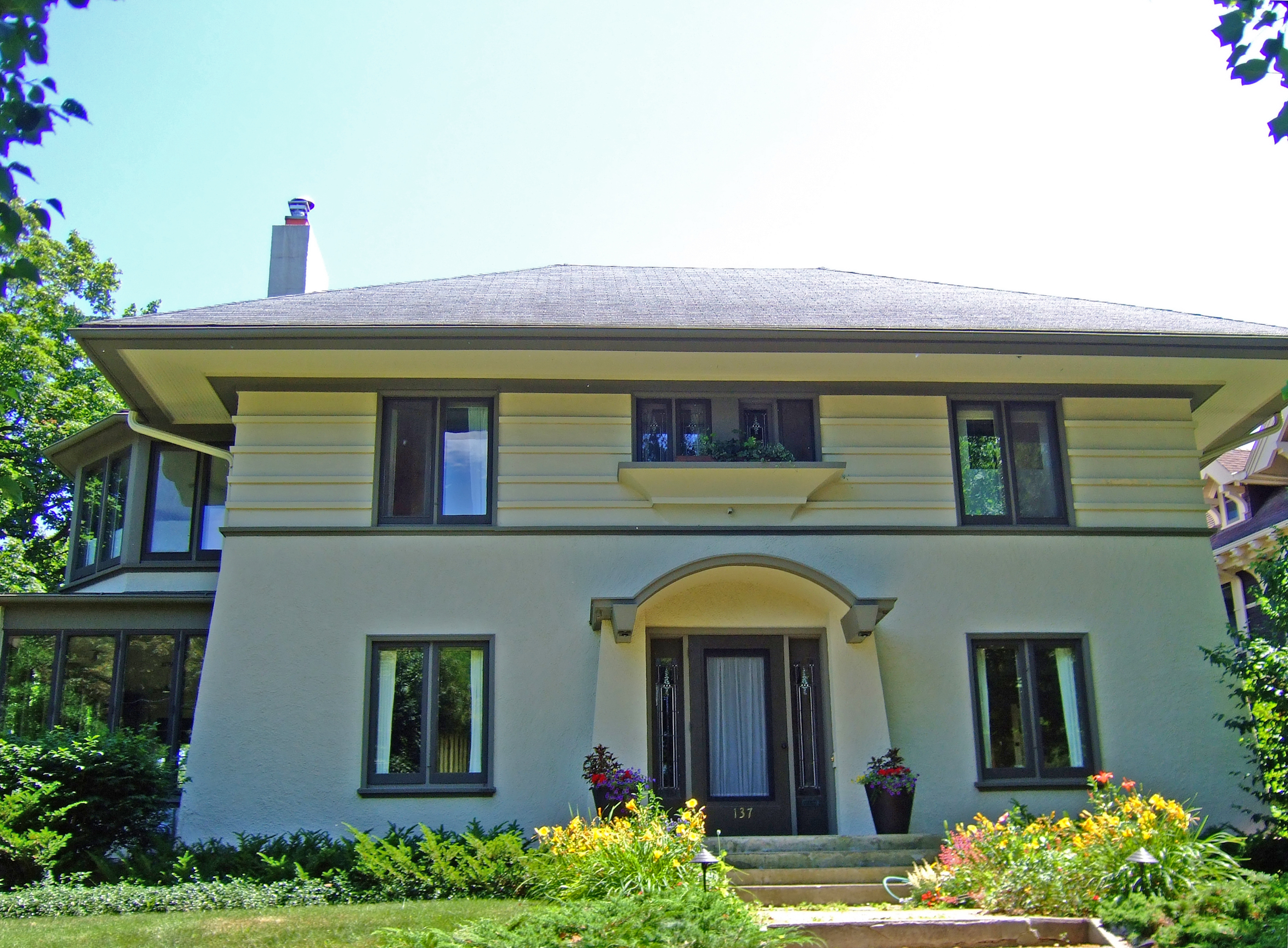
Elliott's home in Wisconsin is on the National Register of Historic Places.

In 1903, Elliott accepted a fellowship at Teachers College, Columbia University. His doctoral dissertation was among the first works to apply statistics to the study of school administration. Elliott continued his research at the University of Wisconsin–Madison and devised a unique scale to rate teachers' merit and competency. In a series of studies with Daniel Starch, Elliott showed that a student's assignment can receive a wide variety of grades depending on the teacher and the school. He also participated in commissions that carried out early school surveys of Boise, New York City, Vermont and Portland, Oregon.

As director of Wisconsin's committees for accrediting schools and training teachers, he raised the requirements for obtaining a teacher's certification, although most of his initiatives were undone after he left the university. One longer-lasting program of Elliott's committees was the establishment of Wisconsin High School, where the university could observe new teachers.

Elliott was a charter member of the American Association of University Professors. He served on its Committee on Academic Freedom for a few months before moving to Montana.

== The University of Montana ==
From 1916 to 1922, Elliott served as the first "Chancellor of the University of Montana". This university system combined four previously separate campuses throughout the state. (One of these four was the present "University of Montana", which was then called "The State University at Missoula".) He worked to bring efficiency to the system's procedures for budget requests, accounting and high school recruiting. Although no buildings had been built in the ten years before his chancellorship, Elliott pushed for a property tax and a bond issue that funded the construction of 13 new buildings. Another of his initiatives had the state refund the costs for all students to travel to one of the university campuses once a year.

A nationwide controversy began in 1919 with Elliott's dismissal of an economics professor. Elliott and Edward O. Sisson, president of the State University, encouraged professor Louis Levine to conduct a study of Montana's tax system. A draft of Levine's report, The Taxation of Mines in Montana, concluded that state laws gave an unfair advantage to the mining industry, and that these companies should be made to pay a higher amount of taxes. The mining industry had a significant influence on the Montana legislature, and Elliott warned Levine that his study could harm state appropriations to the university. Not wanting the university to be involved in a political controversy, Elliott refused to have the university's name associated with Levine's report. When Levine published it independently in February 1919, Elliott suspended him from the faculty for insubordination and unprofessional conduct. Magazines The New Republic and The Nation, Upton Sinclair's book The Goose-Step, and many newspapers considered this an attack on academic freedom and an example of the dominance of the mining industry in Montana. A review committee at the university upheld Elliott's decision to fire Levine, but asked the State Board of Education to reinstate the professor and reduce the chancellor's power to dismiss faculty in the future.

== Purdue University ==
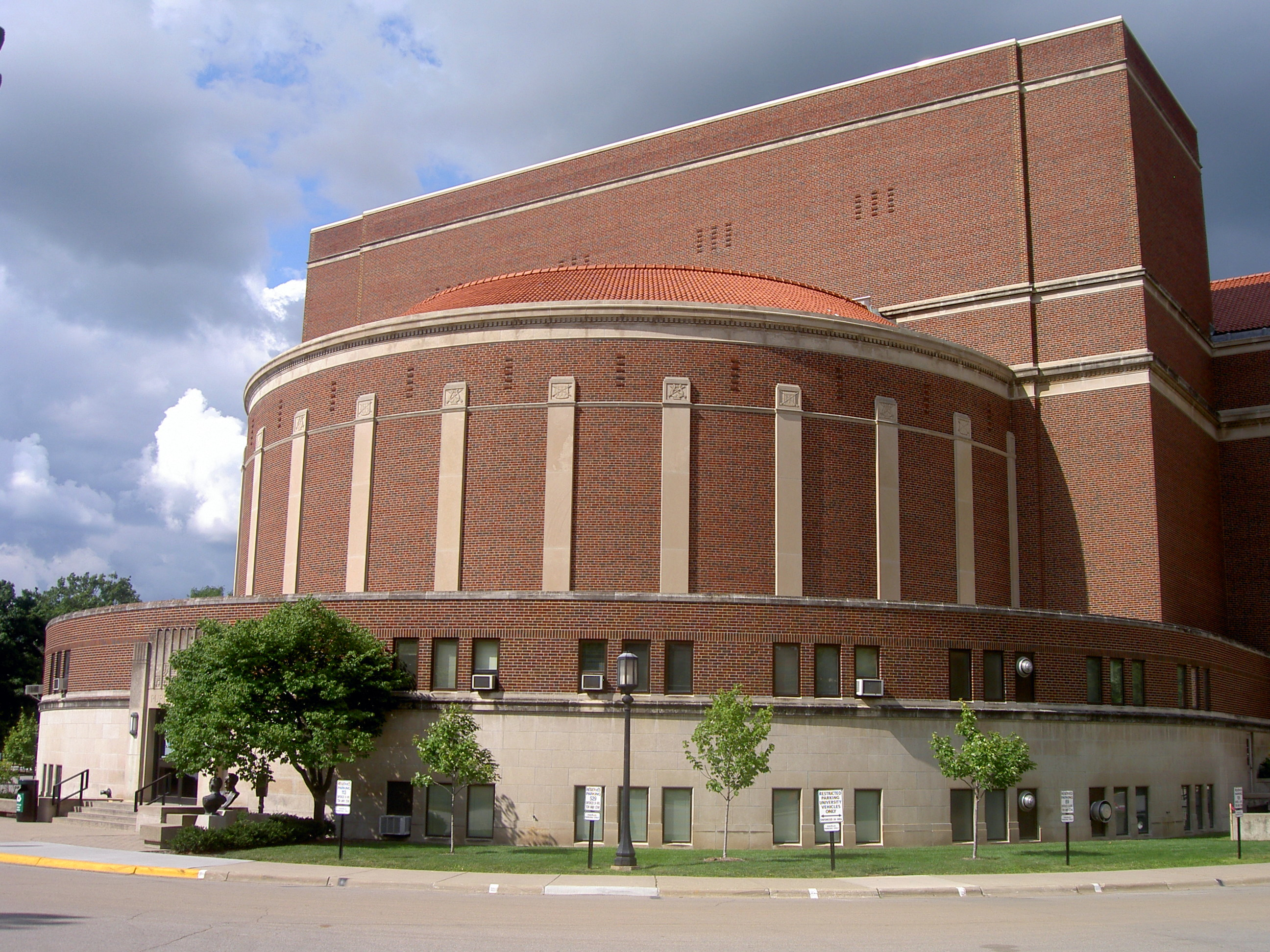
Elliott Hall of Music, Purdue University

For the next 23 years, from 1922 until 1945, Elliott served as the sixth president of Purdue University. During his presidency—the second longest in the university's history—enrollment rose from 3,200 to 8,600 students. There was approximately a doubling in staff, course offerings, major buildings and land acreage, and the physical plant value increased from 3.7 billion to 18.7 billion dollars.

Elliott supported a more flexible and individualized curriculum. The president's probation policy replaced Purdue's previous practice of promptly expelling the pupils who were not passing. The university organized an orientation program and a graduate school and built the first of its current system of residence halls. In 1935 Elliott hired aviator Amelia Earhart and industrial engineer Lillian Gilbreth as visiting faculty members to find ways to improve the education of women.

Early in his presidency, Elliott changed Purdue's budgeting procedures by hiring its first comptroller and business manager. In 1924, Purdue developed a plan for campus development that remained relatively unchanged for sixty years. Although state funding was reduced during the Depression, Elliott continued to grow the university by obtaining funds from the federal New Deal agencies. Growth was also supported by four corporations that Elliott helped to establish with close ties to the university. These were the Ross–Ade Foundation, the Purdue Research Foundation, a re-incorporated Better Homes in America, and the Purdue Aeronautics Corporation.

At first, Elliott was skeptical of spending university money on musical organizations. Once, when asked to fund a new choir, Elliott shouted, "Never, as long as I am president, will this university spend one damn penny on music on this campus, young man! Get that through your head!" By 1934, however, Elliott was proposing the construction of a new auditorium. In 1938 he lobbied the state legislature to fund this project. The Hall of Music opened in 1940 and has been known since 1958 as the Edward C. Elliott Hall of Music.

Prominent Indiana Democrats tried to convince Elliott to run for Governor of Indiana in 1940 and the United States Senate in 1945; he refused both times. Also in 1940, he served as the university's athletic director after the death of Noble Kizer.

During World War II, many of Purdue University's resources were used to support the war effort. Purdue operated on an accelerated academic calendar and thousands of its students participated in military training. Elliott supported the idea of universal military training and refused to allow students to protest the draft. He took a leave of absence in 1942 and 1943 to serve as chief of a division of the War Manpower Commission, where he suggested ways for universities and colleges to contribute to the war effort.

Future federal judge, Leon Higginbotham entered Purdue as a freshman in 1944. At the time, the student body was composed of approximately 6,000 white students, and 12 black students. Although eligible for admission, black students were not permitted to live in the dormitories. Higginbotham and the other 11 black students were placed in a building called International House, which was the only building that blacks could live in West Lafayette. The students slept in the attic, which was unheated. Higginbotham sought a meeting with the University President, Edward C. Elliott, to ask permission for the students to sleep in a section of one of the heated dormitories. Elliot's response was purportedly "[t]he law doesn't require us to put you in those dormitories. The law doesn't even require us to let you in. You take it or leave it."

== Retirement ==
Upon reaching Purdue's mandatory retirement age, Elliott retired from the university in 1945. He spent the next few years in Washington, D.C., to direct the Pharmaceutical Survey. This national survey studied what pharmacists do and how universities should prepare them. As the first president emeritus of Purdue University, Elliott moved to a house near the campus in 1948 and continued to participate in university activities until his death in 1960. Six years later, the University of Montana opened a student housing complex called Elliott Village.

== Notes ==
References

- Burrin, Frank K. (1970). Edward Charles Elliott, Educator. Lafayette, Indiana: Purdue University Studies. ISBN 0-911198-19-9.
- Gutfeld, Arnon (February 1970). "The Levine Affair: A Case Study in Academic Freedom". Pacific Historical Review. 39 (1). University of California Press: 19–37. doi:10.2307/3638196. JSTOR 3638196.
- Topping, Robert W. (1988). A Century and Beyond: The History of Purdue University. West Lafayette, Indiana: Purdue University Press. ISBN 0-911198-95-4.
