= Richard Owen (geologist) =

1st Purdue University President (1872–1874), American military officer, and geologist

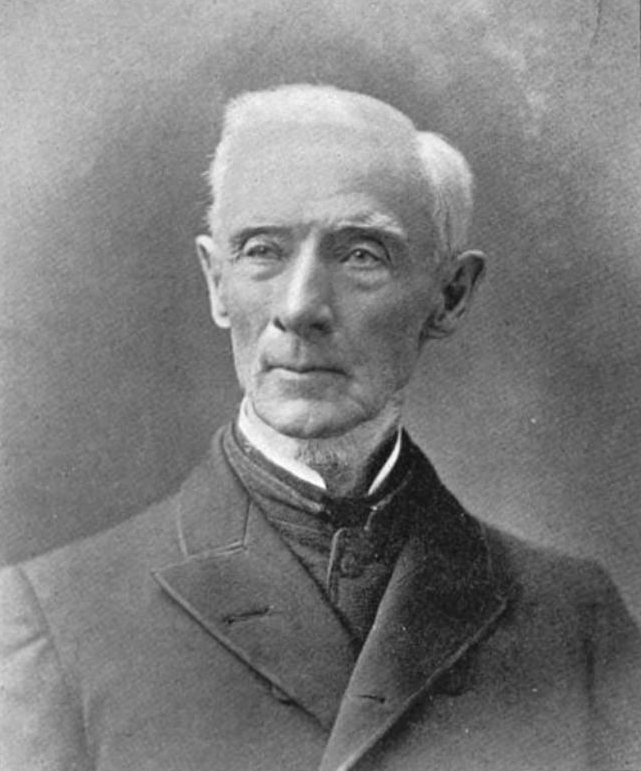

1st President of Purdue University
- In office August 13, 1872 – March 1, 1874
- Preceded by: Office established
- Succeeded by: Abraham Crum Shortridge

Personal details
- Born: January 6, 1810 Lanarkshire, Scotland
- Died: March 25, 1890 (aged 80) New Harmony, Indiana, U.S.
- Resting place: Maple Hill Cemetery (New Harmony, Indiana)
- Spouse(s): Martha Chase (m. 1828–1828) Anne Eliza Neef (m. 1837–1890)
- Children: 2
- Parent: Robert Owen (father)
- Relatives: Robert Dale Owen (brother); David Dale Owen (brother)
- Occupation: U.S. military officer, geologist, and educator

Richard Owen (January 6, 1810 – March 25, 1890) was a Scottish-born geologist, natural scientist, educator, and American military officer who arrived in the United States in 1828 and settled at New Harmony, Indiana. Owen, who was trained as a natural scientist and physician, served as an infantry officer in the U.S. Army during the Mexican–American War and the American Civil War. After the Civil War, Owen taught at Indiana University for fifteen years (1864–79) and chaired its natural science department. While retaining his faculty position at IU, Owen also served as Purdue University's first president (1872–74). During the interwar years, Owen taught natural science at the Western Military Institute in Kentucky and after its merger with the University of Nashville in Tennessee. In addition, Owen assisted his brother, David Dale Owen, with early geological studies of the Northwest Territory. In 1860 Richard Owen succeeded his brother to become Indiana's second state geologist. His research interests included geology, meteorology, terrestrial magnetism, and seismology. Owen authored scientific works that included geological surveys of several U.S. states.

As a colonel in the Union army's 60th Indiana Infantry Regiment during the American Civil War, Owen was appointed commander of Camp Morton, a prisoner-of-war camp for 4,000 Confederate soldiers at Indianapolis, Indiana. Owen served from February to May 1862 and became well known and respected for his humanitarian treatment of its prisoners. He returned to active duty in June 1862 and was captured and released by the Confederate army before he resigned from the military in December 1863. A bronze bust was dedicated at the Indiana Statehouse in Indianapolis in 1913 to recognize his leadership at Camp Morton during the war. Buildings on the Indiana University campus in Bloomington and the Purdue University campus in West Lafayette are named in his honor.

== Early life and education ==
Richard Owen, the youngest son of Ann (or Anne) Caroline Dale and Robert Owen, was born on January 6, 1810, in Lanarkshire, Scotland. Owen's Welsh-born father was a philanthropist and successful textile manufacturer in New Lanark, Scotland, who became a noted social reformer. Owen's Scottish mother was the daughter of David Dale, a wealthy textile manufacturer. Richard was one of eight children; one of whom died in infancy. His surviving siblings (three brothers and three sisters) were Robert Dale, William, David Dale, Anne (or Anne) Caroline, Jane Dale, and Mary.

Owen grew up at Braxfield House, the Owen family's estate in Scotland, and received his early education from private tutors and at New Lanark grammar schools. He attended Philipp Emanuel von Fellenberg's school in Hofwyl, Switzerland, where he studied chemistry, physics, and natural sciences, among other subjects. Owen's three years as the Swiss school exposed him to Johann Heinrich Pestalozzi's method of education. After returning to Scotland, Owen continued his education, specializing in chemistry, under Andrew Ure at Andersonian Institute (the present-day University of Strathclyde) at Glasgow.

Owen arrived in the United States in 1828 and joined his brothers (Robert Dale, William, and David Dale Owen) in Indiana, where their father had established a utopian experimental community at New Harmony in 1825. During the Mexican–American War, Owen was stationed in Monterrey overseeing provision trains as a captain from April 1847 until August 1848.

Although the socialistic experiment was dissolved in 1827, many of the town's inhabitants, including Owen and his siblings, continued to reside at New Harmony. Owen periodically left the area to travel and for his professional work, but New Harmony remained his permanent home. He returned during the summer months and spent his retirement years researching and writing at New Harmony.

== Marriage and family ==
In 1828 Owen was briefly married Martha Chase, a teacher at New Harmony, but left town soon after her death to travel and work for a few years. He returned to Indiana in 1836.

Owen married New Harmony resident Anne Eliza Neef (1819–1895) on March 23, 1837, in a triple wedding ceremony. Owen's brother, David Dale, married Anne's sister, Caroline, and his brother, William, married Mary Bolton in the same ceremony. The three couples shared the Owen family home at New Harmony for the first three years of their married life, along with their brother, Robert Dale, and his wife, Mary Jane, and their sister, Jane Dale, and her husband, Robert H. Fauntleroy. The siblings later established households for their own families.

Richard and Anne Owen had two sons, Eugene Fellenberg Owen and Horace Pestalozzi Owen. Like their father, Eugene and Horace served as Union army officers during the American Civil War. Eugene became a farmer and raised livestock in Indiana; Horace became an Indiana businessman and banker.

== Career ==
Although Owen shared a strong interest in education and social reform with his father, Robert, and older brother, Robert Dale, he trained as a scientist and had a long career as a university professor and geologist. He also served as a military officer during the Mexican–American War and the American Civil War.

=== Early career ===
In 1828, after the death of his first wife and dissolution of the utopian experiment at New Harmony, Owen traveled for a few years, farmed in Lancaster County, Pennsylvania, and lived in Cincinnati, Ohio, where he briefly worked in a brewery, before returning to New Harmony in 1836 to operate a steam-powered flour mill and manage a livestock farm.

=== Scientist ===
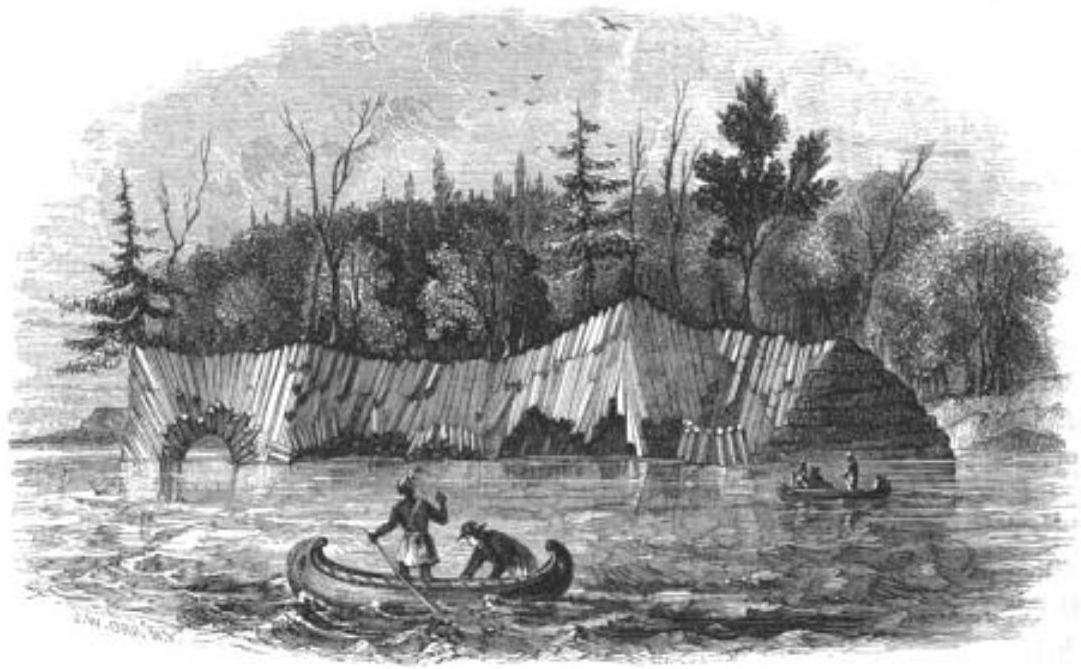
One of Owen's sketches of columnar basalt on Lake Superior

In 1848 Owen began assisting his brother, David Dale Owen, who was appointed as Indiana's first state geologist, in performing geological work in the Northwest Territory. In the summer of 1849 Owen assisted his brother in conducting a geological survey of northern Minnesota and the shores of Lake Superior. Owen's duties primarily consisted of recording atmospheric pressure measurements and making illustrative sketches. Later that year Owen accepted a professorship in natural science at the Western Military Institute in Kentucky. He remained a member of the school's faculty until 1859 and an owner of the institute with Bushrod Johnson, who later became a general in the Confederate States Army. During Owen's tenure at the school, it was relocated to Tennessee and merged with the University of Nashville. In addition to teaching at the university, Owen published one of his major works, Key to the Geology of the Globe (1857) and received a Doctor of Medicine degree from the Medical College of Nashville in 1858. Prior to the outbreak of the American Civil War and largely because of his anti-slavery opinions, Owen resigned his position and sold his financial interest in the Institute in 1858.

After his return to Indiana, Owen was appointed assistant state geologist and helped his brother, David Dale Owen, with surveys of the central part of the state. When David died in 1860, Richard Owen succeeded him to become Indiana's second state geologist. Richard Owen also completed and published David Owen's second geological survey of Indiana, Report of a geological Reconnaissance of Indiana (1862). As a result of his promotion to state geologist, Owen became an ex officio member of the Indiana University faculty at Bloomington, Indiana. and was serving as the state geologist of Indiana when the American Civil War began in 1861.

=== American Civil War officer ===
Owen, a pro-Union Democrat, joined the Union army and served as a lieutenant colonel in the 15th Indiana Infantry Regiment and fought in the battles of Rich Mountain, Greenbrier River, and Cheat Mountain. Owen was promoted to colonel after the Battle of Greenbrier River and reenlisted in the 60th Indiana Infantry Regiment, where he remained until December 1863.

On February 24, 1862, Colonel Owen was placed in command of 4,000 Confederate prisoners of war at Camp Morton in Indianapolis, Indiana. Following his arrival in Indianapolis in late February, Owen established a daily routine for the newly established camp and outlined a set of rules for supervision of its prisoners. The prison camp regulations that Owen wrote placed much of the disciplinary authority in the hands of the Confederate sergeants. Owen's humane treatment of the prisoners included providing them books and allowing them to form glee clubs, theatrical groups, and sports teams. Owen also created a camp bakery that was staffed by the prisoners. Cost savings gained from the on-site baker provided additional funds to purchase supplies and food for the prisoners. Despite these privileges, Owen was also a disciplinarian who proved to be a capable and vigilant officer. He strictly enforced the restrictions on mail and visitors and only a few prisoners made a successful escape. Many of Camp Morton's prisoners were grateful for the humane treatment they received under Owen's leadership. He also earned the respect of his fellow officers and superiors for the efficient organization of the camp and management of its resources.

On May 26, 1862, Owen and his regiment were ordered to active service in Kentucky. Upon learning that Owen and his men would soon be replaced, some of Camp Morton's prisoners petitioned Indiana governor Oliver P. Morton to have Owen and the 60th Indiana retained for service at the camp, but the request was denied. Owen and his regiment left for Louisville, Kentucky, on June 20, 1862, then transferred to Lebanon, Kentucky, and engaged in battle position at Munfordville, Kentucky. When Owen and others from his regiment were captured at Munfordville in September 1862, Confederate General Simon Bolivar Buckner personally thanked Owen for his kind treatment of the Camp Morton prisoners. In addition, Owen was allowed to retain his sidearms. Owen's men were paroled three months later. After the prisoner exchange, Owen returned to active military service in the Union army.

During the final months of his military service, Owen led his men through other battles, including Vicksburg, Jackson, and Bayou Bourbeux in 1863. Confident that the Union would win the war, Owen resigned his commission in the Union army at the end of 1863 and returned to civilian life in Indiana.

=== University professor and state geologist ===
On January 1, 1864, Owen became a professor of natural sciences at Indiana University and moved to Bloomington, Indiana. He retained the position at IU for fifteen years, until his retirement in 1879. Because Owen continued to serve as Indiana's state geologist, state law mandated that he also serve as the chair of IU's natural science department. In addition to geology, Owen taught, chemistry, language, and "natural philosophy." Owen also sold the university a collection of stones, fossils, and soil that his family had collected. Owen was also active in the local Presbyterian church, where he taught Sunday school classes.

A versatile writer, Owen authored articles for professional journals, popular magazines, and newspapers. In the 1860s he published geological surveys of New Mexico, Arizona, and North Carolina. His research interests included the causes of earthquakes and their effect on the formation of the planet. He also studied the Earth's magnetic field. According to Owen, physical geography had a large influence on the course of history and civilization. (This area of study has been labelled environmental determinism.) Owen was well-respected among the IU faculty and was often called on to advise university president Cyrus Nutt on faculty appointments. Owen remained on the IU faculty during his two-year tenure as president of Purdue University.

=== University president ===
After the U.S. Congress passed the Morrill Land-Grant Colleges Act (1862), Owen worked with IU's President Nutt on a proposal to establish an agricultural college as an affiliate Indiana University. However, the state government decided instead to use the land-grant funds to develop a separate school west of Lafayette in 1869 that became Purdue University.

While remaining a member of the IU faculty, Owen helped plan the new university at West Lafayette. Purdue trustees selected Owen as the school's first president on August 13, 1872, after William S. Clark of the Massachusetts Agricultural College declined their offer. Shortly after his appointment in 1872, Owen sold the university a collection of science books to help establish its first library.

Owen planned to run Purdue with an equal emphasis on the physical, moral, and intellectual aspects of education. Students who violated rules would be tried by a jury of fellow students, a system that Owen said was successful in European schools. Critics found many of Owen's initiatives to be unnecessary and his overall plan to be inadequate. The trustees disagreed with Owen's strong emphasis on agriculture over other academic fields, as well as his desire for more comfortable dormitories and more picturesque trees on the campus. As a result of these disagreements, Owen resigned on March 1, 1874, and was succeeded by Indianapolis educator Abraham C. Shortridge.

During Owen's nearly two-year presidency, he made four trips to Lafayette and never drew a salary. Although ground had been broken on Purdue's first buildings and the university began to hire instructors, Owen resigned before its first regular semester of classes were in session. (The first informal classes were held in March 1874, after Owen had resigned, to meet a legislative deadline; the first official semester began in September.) After his resignation as the university's president, Owen resumed teaching full-time at Indiana University and served as curator of IU's museum on the Bloomington campus.

== Later years ==
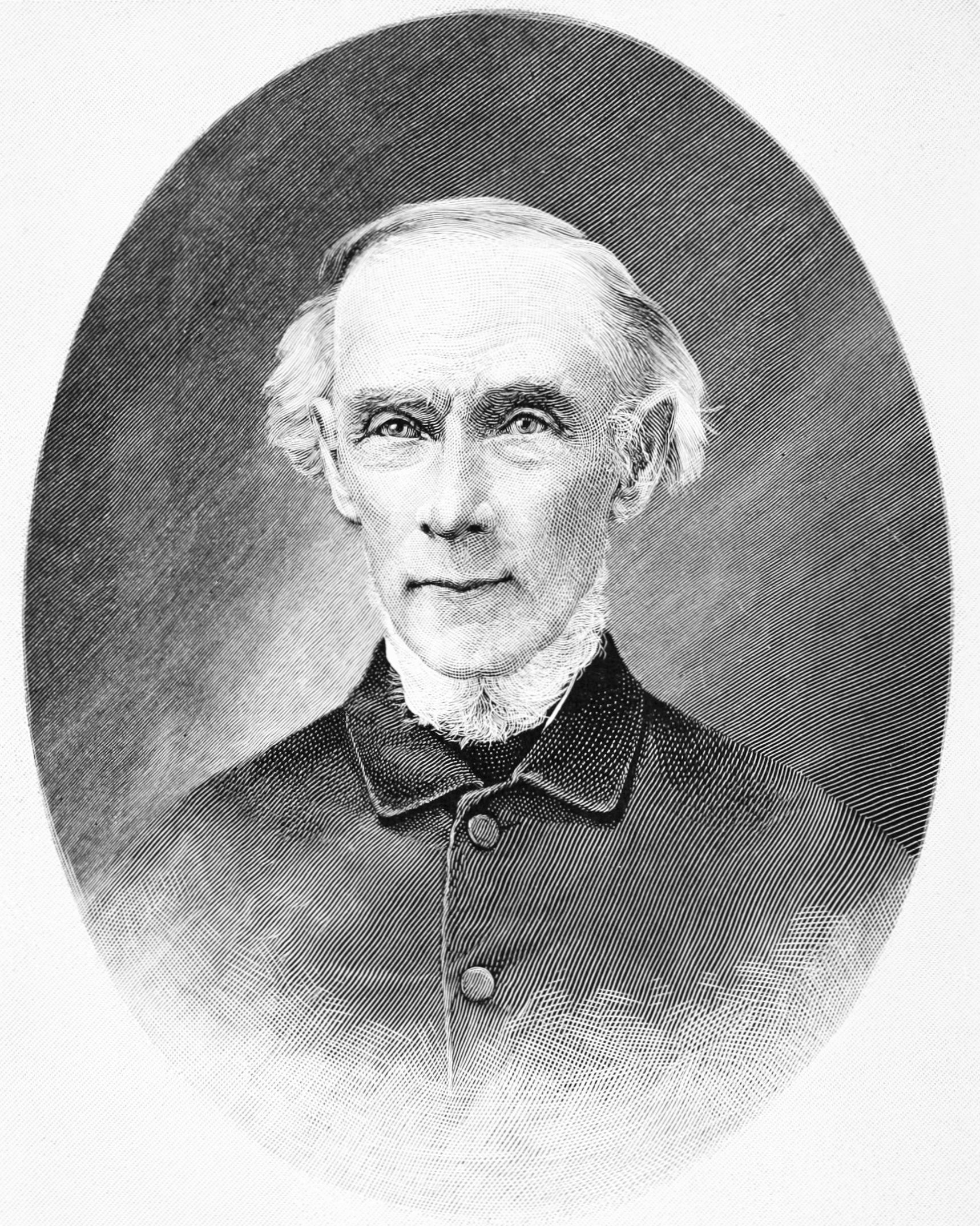
Richard Owen

Hearing problems caused by sunstroke led to Owen's retirement from Indiana University on May 11, 1879. Owen remained active during his retirement years at New Harmony, Indiana, where he continued to read, conduct research, and publish works related to his scientific interests in physics, meteorology, medicine, and geology. Owen also traveled to deliver lectures and speeches.

In 1889, he entered a contest held by the Belgian government to find ways to popularize the study of geography. Owen received an honorable mention for the relief maps made of putty that he had shipped to Brussels.

== Death and legacy ==
On March 25, 1890, Owen died from accidental poisoning. A local grocer had mistakenly sent a bottle of embalming fluid labeled "medicated water" to Owen's neighbor. Thinking it was mineral water, Owen and his neighbor drank a small quantity, which was enough to cause Owen's death. Owen is buried in Maple Hill Cemetery in New Harmony, Indiana, where his epitaph reads: "His first desire was to be virtuous, his second to be wise."

In addition to his military service, especially his leadership of Camp Morton during the American Civil War, Owen was an authority on earthquakes and is best known for his contributions to the early geological surveys of Indiana, Wisconsin, Minnesota, and Iowa, as well as his original research in the natural sciences.

== Honors and tributes ==
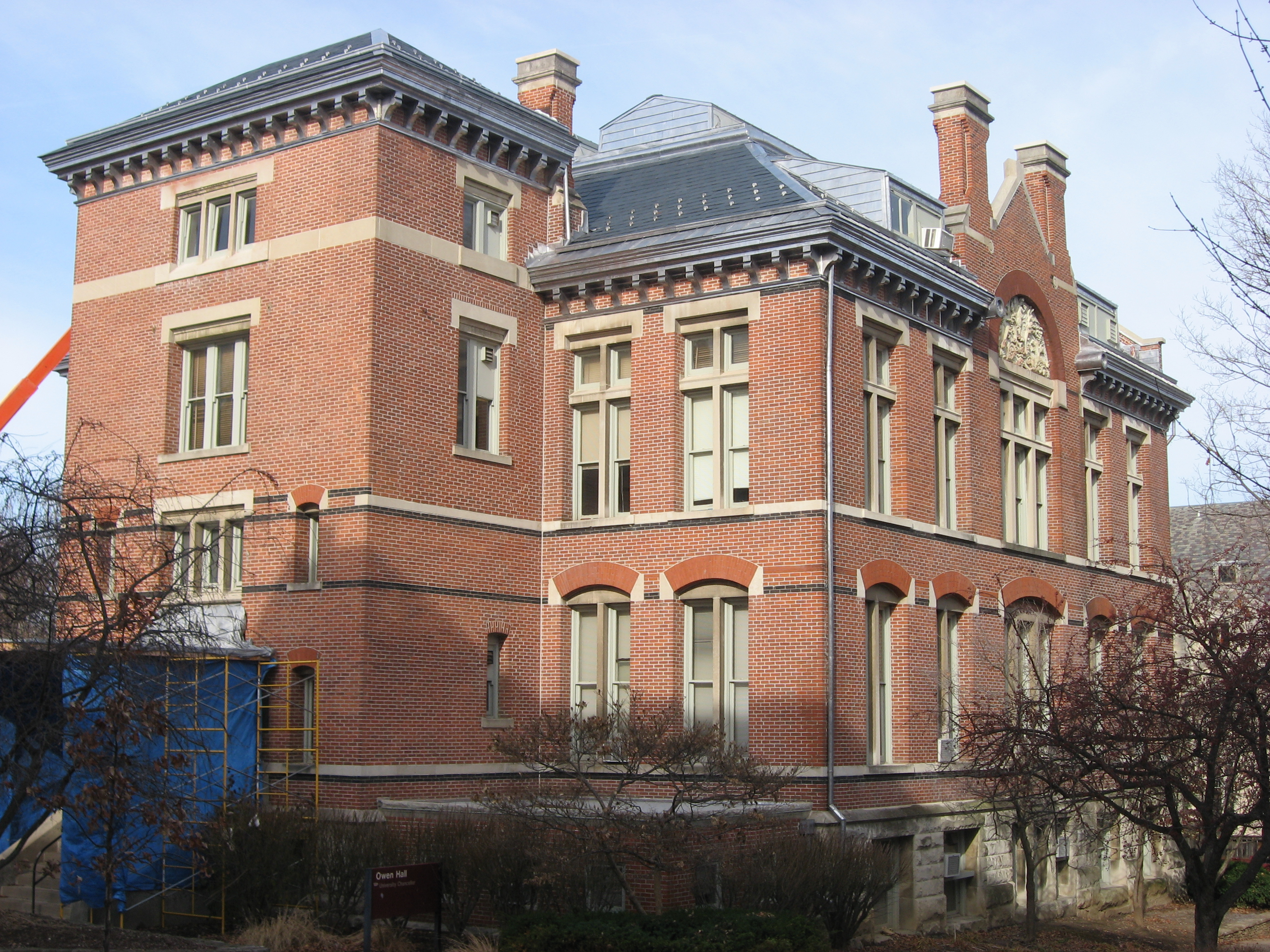
Owen Hall, Indiana University

Buildings named in Owen's honor were erected at Dunn's Woods on Indiana University's Bloomington campus and at Purdue University's campus in West Lafayette, Indiana. IU's Owen Hall was among the first structures built on the present-day Bloomington campus after a fire destroyed the main building and museum at its earlier campus in July 1883. About a thousand of the specimens from what was called the "Owen Cabinet" were saved from the fire, but most of these were sent to the Smithsonian Institution in Washington, D.C. George W. Bunting, an Indianapolis architect, designed the new building to house IU's department of natural sciences and a museum, which included twenty-two items from Owen collection. Owen Hall later housed the office of IU's chancellor. Most sources report that IU's Owen Hall is named for Richard Owen; however, others says it is named in honor of the Richard Owen and his two brothers, Robert and David. Owen Hall at Purdue University is a student residence hall opened in 1957.

After the American Civil War, Camp Morton's former prisoners held Owen in such high esteem that they collected funds and received permission to erect a monument in his honor. In 1913 a group of Confederate Army veterans led by the newspaper magnate, Sergeant Major Sumner Archibald Cunningham, dedicated a bronze a bust of Colonel Owen by Belle Kinney at the Indiana Statehouse in Indianapolis. The memorial commemorates Owen's "courtesy and kindness" toward the Confederate prisoners who were held at Camp Morton in Indianapolis during the war. A replica of the bronze bust of Owen was placed at the Indiana Memorial Union on the IU campus in Bloomington.

== Selected published works ==
- Key to the Geology of the Globe (1857)
- Report of a geological Reconnaissance of Indiana (1862), with David Dale Owen)
- Report on the Mines of New Mexico (1865), with E. T. Cox

Although Owen's wrote articles that appeared scientific publications such as the American Journal of Science, Scientific American, the American Meteorological Journal, and the Southwestern Journal of Education, he did not write exclusively for his peers. Owen also wrote articles that appeared in the Indianapolis Journal, the New York Tribune, the Indiana Farmer, and the Evansville Journal for a wider audience of readers who were interested in the natural sciences.

== Works cited ==
- Albjerg, Victor Lincoln (March 1946). Richard Owen: Scotland 1810, Indiana 1890. The Archives of Purdue, no. 2. Lafayette, Indiana.
- Arndt, Karl J. R. (1965). George Rapp's Harmony Society 1785–1847. Philadelphia: University of Pennsylvania Press.
- Clark, Thomas D. (1970). Indiana University, Midwestern Pioneer Volume I: The Early Years. Bloomington and London: Indiana University Press. ISBN 978-0-2531-4170-5.
- "Did You Know? Purdue's first president". Purdue University. August 28, 2014.
- Elliott, Josephine Mirabella (December 1964). "The Owen Family Papers". Indiana Magazine of History. 60 (4). Bloomington: Indiana University: 331–52.
- Estabrook, Arthur H. (1923). "The Family History of Robert Owen". Indiana Magazine of History. 19 (1). Bloomington: Indiana University: 63–101.
- Gugin, Linda C.; St. Clair, James E., eds. (2015). Indiana's 200: The People Who Shaped the Hoosier State. Indianapolis: Indiana Historical Society Press. ISBN 978-0-87195-387-2.
- Leopold, Richard William (1940). Robert Dale Owen, A Biography. Harvard Historical Studies. Vol. 45. Cambridge, Massachusetts: Harvard University Press. OCLC 774894.
- Burgess, Dale (June 3, 1961). "Marble Headstone Proves Civil War Not All Glamor". The Register-Guard. Eugene, Oregon. Associated Press.
- Purdue University Housing and Food Services. "Owen Hall".
- "Owen Hall on the campus of Indiana University, Bloomington". University of Evansville.
- Pitzer, Donald E. (Spring 2014). "Why New Harmony is World Famous". Traces of Indiana and Midwestern History. 26 (2). Indianapolis: Indiana Historical Society: 4–15.
- Podmore, Frank (1907). Robert Owen: A Biography. Vol. I. New York: D. Appleton and Company.
- "Richard Owen". Indiana Department of Administration.
- "Richard Owen: Distinguished Geologist, Teacher, Author, and Soldier (PE-03)". Indiana University.
- "Richard Owen (1810-1890) geologist, soldier, first president of Purdue University". University of Evansville.
- Topping, Robert W. (1988). A Century and Beyond: The History of Purdue University. West Lafayette, Indiana: Purdue University Press. ISBN 0-911198-95-4.
- Winchell, N. H. (September 1890). "A Sketch of Richard Owen". The American Geologist. 6 (3). Minneapolis, Minnesota: The Geological Publishing Company: 135–45.* Winslow, Hattie Lou, and Joseph R. H. Moore (1995). Camp Morton 1861–1865: Indianapolis Prison Camp. Indianapolis: Indiana Historical Society. ISBN 0-87195-114-2.
- Woodburn, James Albert (1940). History of Indiana University Volume I: 1820–1902. Bloomington, Indiana: Indiana University.
