= Abraham Crum Shortridge =

Purdue University President, 1874-1875

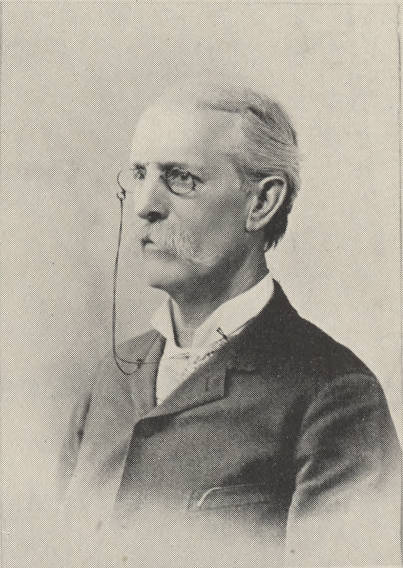

2nd President of Purdue University
- In office 12 June 1874 – 6 November 1875
- Preceded by: Richard Owen
- Succeeded by: John S. Hougham (acting)

Personal details
- Born: October 23, 1833; Henry County, Indiana
- Died: October 8, 1919 (aged 85); Crown Hill Cemetery and Arboretum, Indianapolis, Indiana, U.S.
- Resting place: Section 15, Lot 74; 39.8180453°N 86.1753292°W

Abraham Crum Shortridge (October 22, 1833 – October 8, 1919) was an American educator who was superintendent of the Indianapolis Public Schools and the second president of Purdue University.

== Early life ==
Shortridge was born in Indiana in Henry County. He was named for his maternal grandfather, Abraham Crum (1768–1836). He earned no college degrees and began his teaching career after a few months of study at Rush County's Fairview Academy and Richmond's Greenmount College.

== Career ==
In 1854, Shortridge was part of the group of educators who founded the Indiana State Teachers' Association. In 1868, he served as President of ISTA.

=== Indianapolis ===
In 1861, Shortridge accepted a job in Indianapolis at the preparatory department of what is now Butler University. While in Indianapolis, Shortridge served as the editor of several education journals and helped establish the public library and a teachers' training school.

He became the superintendent of the city's public schools in 1863. This was the year that the state's supreme court reversed a previous decision that prohibited using local taxes to support public schools. Using this newly allowed tax revenue, Shortridge was able to extend the school year from three and a half to nine months and reopen several schools, including Indianapolis High School, which was later renamed as Shortridge High School in his honor.

Shortridge urged the state to provide education for black students; such legislation was passed in 1869. Although this law required racial segregation, Shortridge opened the city's schools to children of any race. In his eleven years as superintendent, the school system grew from 900 to 10,000 students and employed many female teachers.

=== Purdue University ===
The Purdue University Board of Trustees appointed Shortridge as the university's president on June 12, 1874. The 1874–1875 academic year saw the matriculation of Purdue's first students, the establishment of a preparatory academy for those unprepared for college-level work, and the awarding of the first degree to a Purdue graduate. In the second year, the university admitted its first female students and hired its first female instructor. Shortridge's poor health, near blindness, and disagreements with benefactor John Purdue led Shortridge to resign from the university in November 1875. He then bought a farm near Indianapolis and became a justice of the peace in Warren Township.

== Additional sources ==
- Riley, Herman Murray (December 1930). "A History of Negro Elementary Education in Indianapolis". Indiana Magazine of History. 26 (4). ISSN 1942-9711.
- Schutt, Amy C. (1994). "Shortridge, Abram Crum". In Bodenhamer, David J.; Barrows, Robert G. (eds.). The Encyclopedia of Indianapolis. Indiana University Press. p. 1259. ISBN 9780253112491.
- Topping, Robert W. (1988). A Century and Beyond: The History of Purdue University. West Lafayette, Indiana: Purdue University Press. ISBN 0-911198-95-4.
