= Carver Hall =

Academic building at Iowa State University

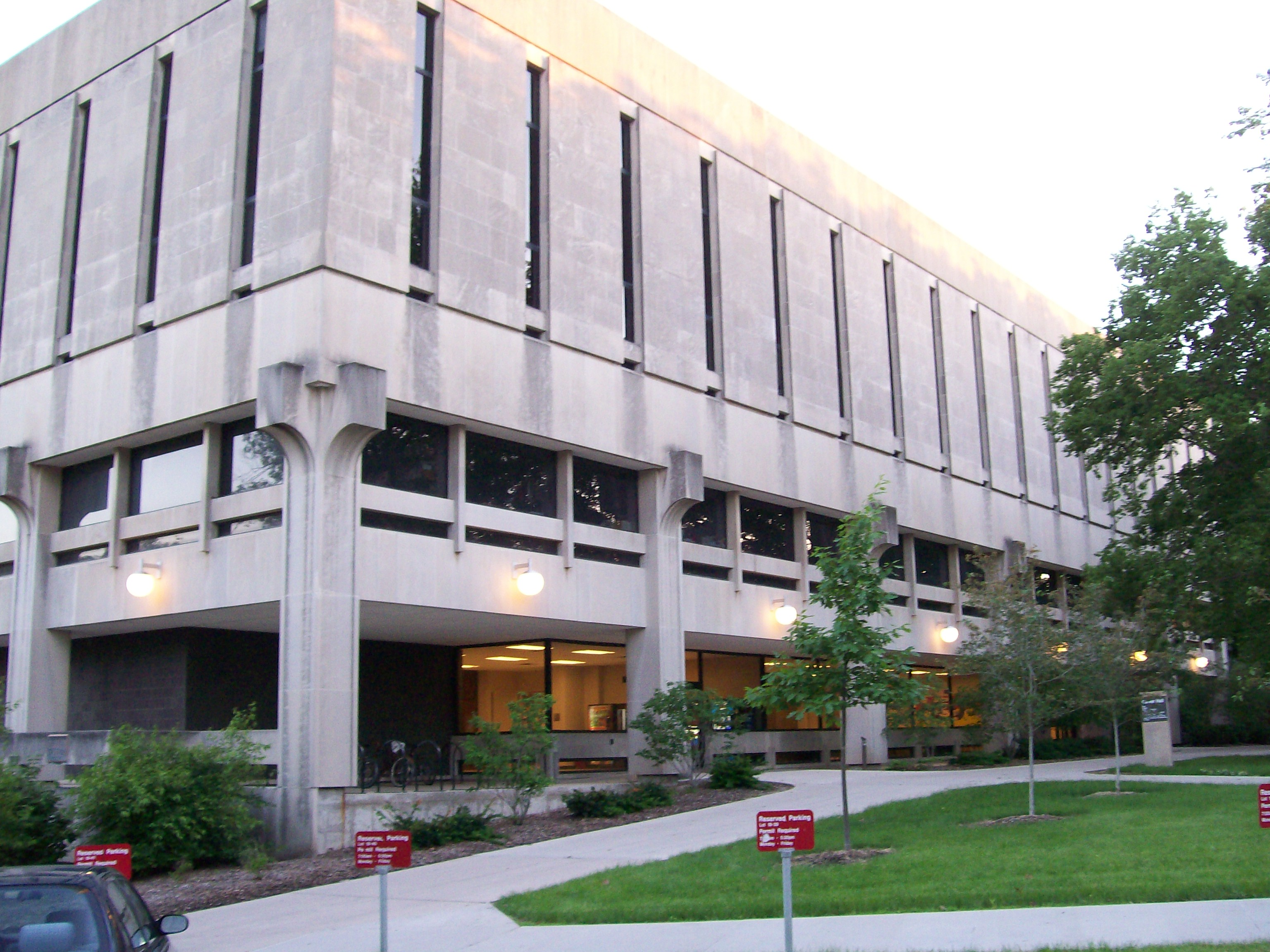
- Carver Hall

General information
- Location: Morill Rd., Iowa State University; Ames, Iowa
- Current tenants: Mathematics
- Completed: 1969; 57 years ago
- Owner: Iowa State University
- Landlord: Iowa State University

Technical details
- Floor area: 66,577 ft^{2} (6,185.2 m^{2})

Carver Hall is an academic building completed in 1969 at Iowa State University in Ames, Iowa, to accommodate rapid increases in enrollment. It is named for George Washington Carver, who earned his bachelor's degree from Iowa State University in 1894 and his master's in 1896 and served on the Iowa State faculty. George Washington Carver is best known for his exhaustive development of peanut products akin to peanut butter. A statue of him created by the internationally acclaimed sculptor Christian Petersen is displayed in a courtyard north of the building's lobby, to honor George Washington Carver's lifelong work in science and human relations.

Carver Hall originally housed the Colleges of Liberal Arts & Sciences and Business, and the Mathematics Department. Following the renovations to Old Botany, Liberal Arts & Sciences moved to its present location in Catt Hall and thus opened additional classroom and office space for the College of Business and the Mathematics Department. In 2003, the College of Business moved to the Gerdin Business Building, leaving the Mathematics Department alone, although, many of the classrooms and lecture halls are used by the entire university.
