= Iowa State University College of Agriculture and Life Sciences =

- Established: 1858
- Dean: Daniel Robison
- Undergraduates: 3,659 (Fall 2024)
- Postgraduates: 803
- Location: Ames, Iowa; 42.02618°N 93.64478°W
- Colors: Cardinal and Gold
- Affiliations: Iowa State University
- Website: cals.iastate.edu

Iowa State University College of Agriculture and Life Sciences is one of eight colleges of Iowa State University of Science and Technology in Ames, Iowa.

The University was founded in 1858 as the Iowa Agricultural College and Model Farm. On July 4, 1959, the school was renamed "Iowa State University of Science and Technology" and the College of Agriculture became one of five colleges (i.e., College of Agriculture, College of Engineering, College of Home Economics, College of Sciences and Humanities, and College of Veterinary Medicine). In 2007, the College of Agriculture was renamed "College of Agriculture and Life Sciences".

== List of deans ==
- Seaman A. Knapp 1879–1885)
- James Wilson (1897–1902)
- Charles F. Curtiss (1902–1932)
- Raymond M. Hughes - interim (1932–1933)
- Henry Herbert Kildee (1933–1949)
- Floyd Andre (1949–1972)
- Marvin A. Anderson - interim (1972–1973)
- Lee Kolmer (1973–1987)
- John Pesek - interim (1987–1988)
- David Topel (1988–2000)
- Richard F. Ross (2000–2002)
- Catherine Woteki (2002–2005)
- Wendy Wintersteen (2005–2017)
- Joe Coletti - interim (2017–2019)
- Daniel Robison (since 2019)

== Recruitment ==
- Andrew Zehr
- Carmen Santiago
