= Laura Jolly =

American academic administrator

Laura Dunn Jolly (born 1955) is an American academic administrator.

Laura Dunn was born in Belzoni, Mississippi, and raised alongside two siblings in the Mississippi Delta region. Her father was a postal worker, and her mother was a county extension agent and educator at the high school and community college levels. Dunn later married Lawton, Oklahoma native David Jolly, with whom she raised two children.

After completing her bachelor's degree in home economics at the University of Mississippi, Jolly earned master's and doctoral degrees in clothing, textiles, and merchandising at Oklahoma State University in 1979 and 1983, respectively. She has taught at the University of Tennessee–Knoxville, Texas Tech University, and Oklahoma State. In 2001, Jolly joined the faculty of the University of Kentucky, where she held the chair of interior design, merchandising and textiles for six years. In 2007, she moved to the University of Georgia. During her tenure at UGA, Jolly served three years as dean and associate director of cooperative extension and experiment station in the College of Family and Consumer Sciences and five years as vice president for instruction. In 2016, Jolly succeeded Pamela White as dean of the Iowa State University College of Human Sciences, where she concurrently holds a Dean's Chair. Jolly was reappointed to the deanship in 2020.
