= Daniel Robison =

American academic administrator (born 1960)

Daniel Julian Robison (born 1960) is an American academic administrator.

== Education ==
Robison obtained a bachelor's degree in forestry and a master's degree in silviculture and forest influences at the State University of New York College of Environmental Science and Forestry before completing a doctorate in entomology at the University of Wisconsin–Madison in 1993.

== Career ==
Robison taught at North Carolina State University for fifteen years, serving for three years as associate dean for research in the College of Natural Resources before leaving for West Virginia University in 2012, where he was dean of the Davis College of Agriculture, Natural Resources and Design and director of the Agriculture and Forestry Experiment Station. He was the first of three candidates considered to succeed Wendy Wintersteen as endowed dean of the College of Agriculture and Life Sciences at Iowa State University and director of the Iowa Agriculture and Home Economics Experiment Station. Robison's selection as dean of ISU's College of Agriculture and Life Sciences was announced on 25 October 2018. Robison assumed deanship duties on 21 January 2019, taking over from interim dean Joe Colletti. Robison announced his retirement from the deanship in May 2026.
