= Barbara Taylor Welander =

American architect

Barbara Taylor Welander was the first registered female architect in the State of Iowa.

Welander was one of a very few number of female students at the Iowa State University College of Engineering. She was appointed by the Governor to the Building Code Advisory Council, eventually becoming chairman. She was also on the Architectural Examining Board, becoming chairman of it.

In 1975, Welander was named one of the Ten Outstanding Young Women of America.

When Welander enrolled in Iowa State's architecture program in 1962, she was one of eleven women in the freshman class. At the end of the five-year program, she was the only woman.
