= Mary Ethel Creswell =

American home economist and academic

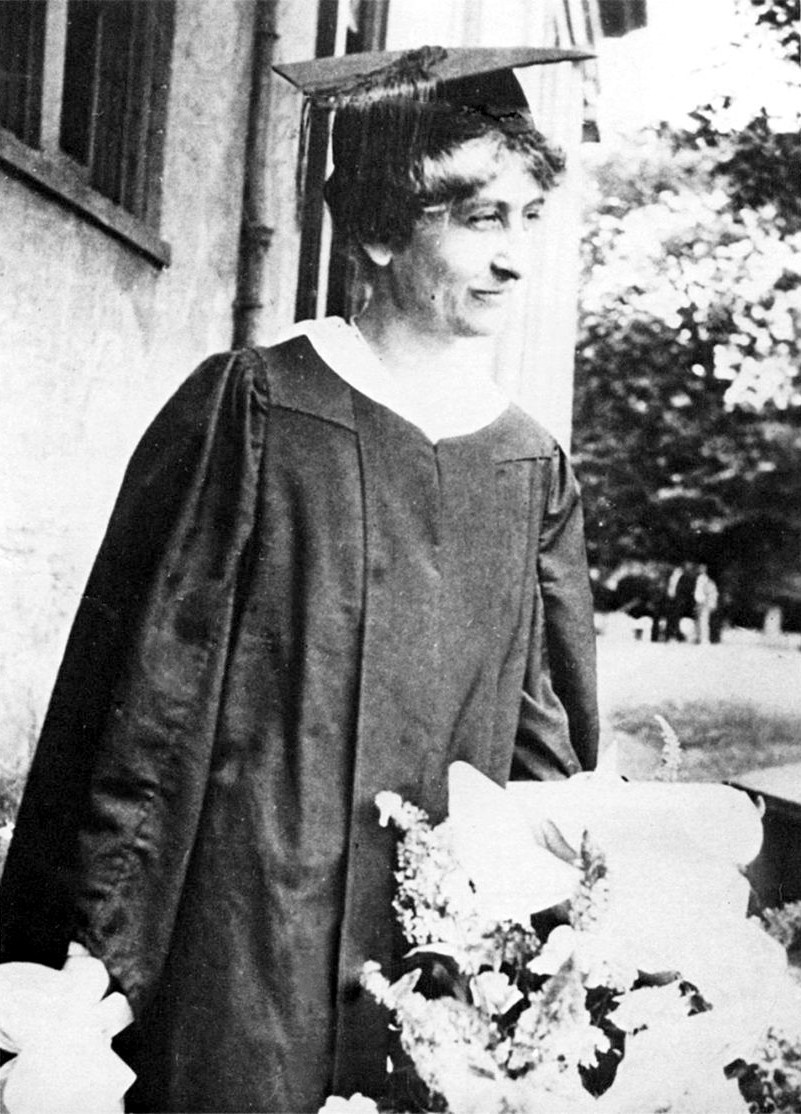
Creswell with her diploma from UGA in 1919

Mary Ethel Creswell (October 15, 1879 – August 7, 1960) was the first female to receive an undergraduate degree from the University of Georgia (UGA) in Athens, Georgia.

In 1918, Creswell was appointed the head of the newly created Division of Home Economics for the university. The following year, she received a baccalaureate degree (B.S. in home economics) from the university.

In 1933, UGA established the College of Family and Consumer Sciences and Creswell was named as the first dean and served in that position until her retirement in 1945. She continued to teach in the college as a professor until 1949.

Creswell was a charter member of the Phi Kappa Phi honor society at UGA and its first female president, and she was the first female recipient of the Georgia Alumni Award for outstanding service to the university in 1949. Creswell died in Athens, Georgia on August 7, 1960. Creswell Hall, a dormitory that houses nearly a thousand students, is named in her honor.
