= Cardinal (color) =

Color (vivid red)

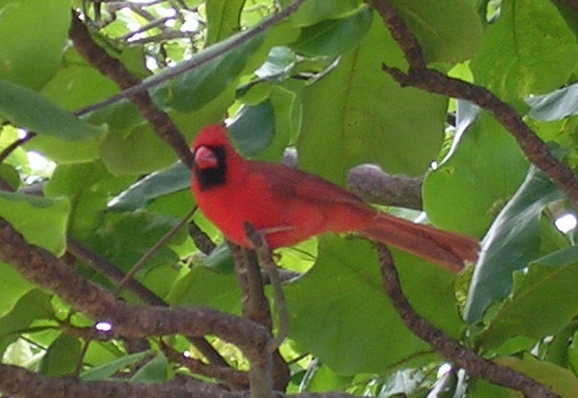
- Cardinal bird in a tree

Color coordinates
- Hex triplet: #C41E3A
- sRGB^{B} (r, g, b): (196, 30, 58)
- HSV (h, s, v): (350°, 85%, 77%)
- CIELCh_{uv} (L, C, h): (43, 119, 8°)
- Source: Maerz and Paul
- ISCC–NBS descriptor: Vivid red
- B: Normalized to [0–255] (byte)

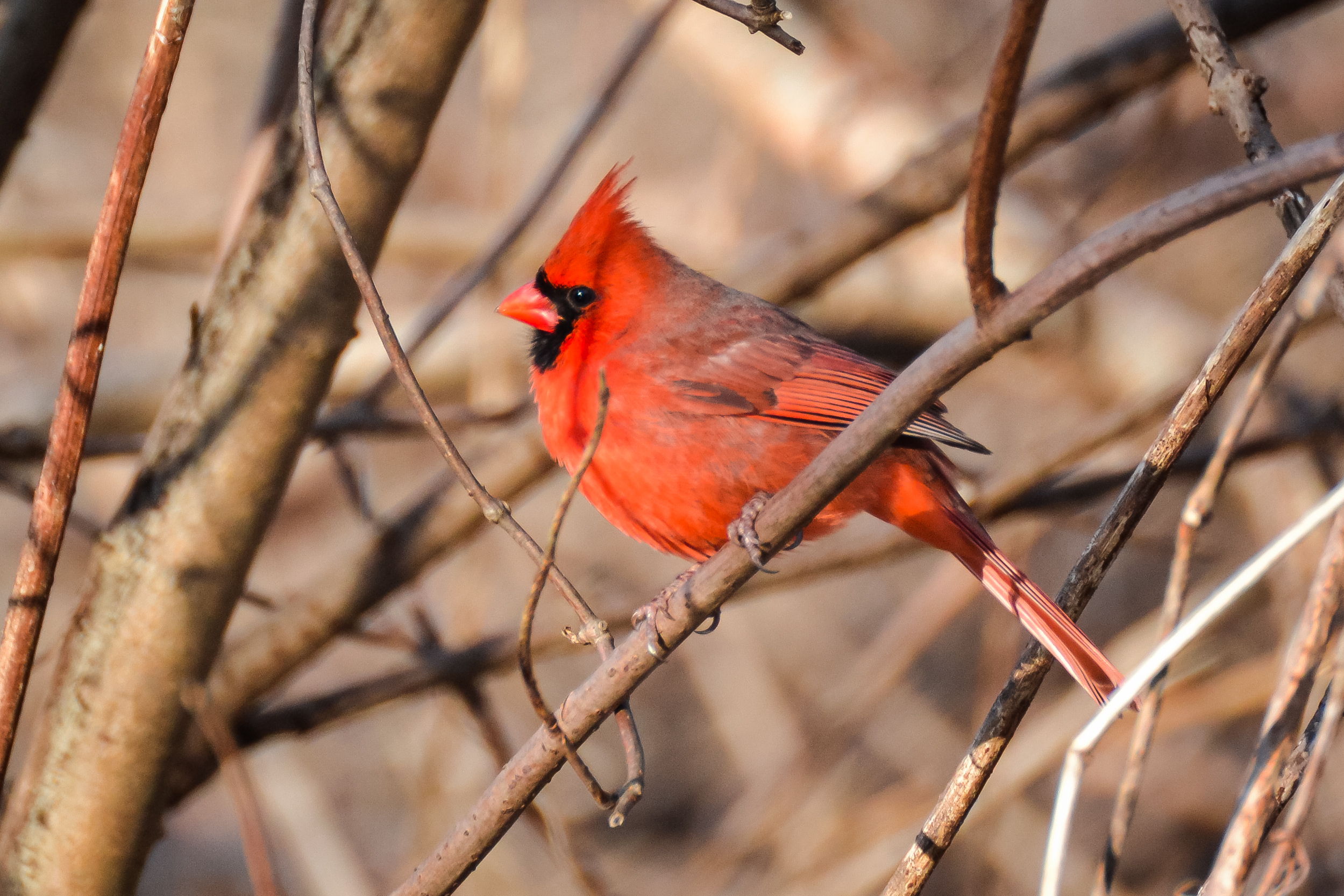
Cardinal bird (male)

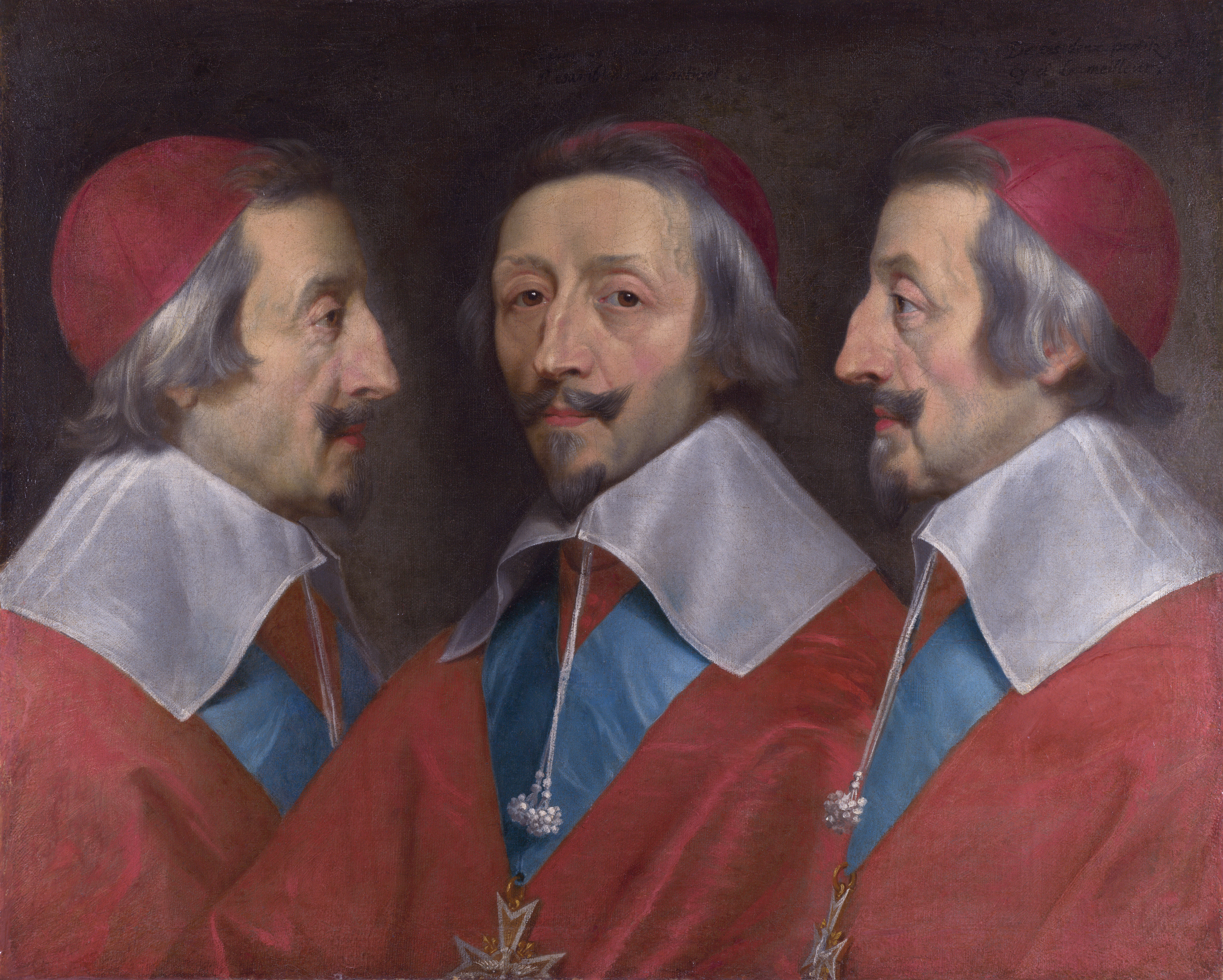
The cardinal color takes its name from the color of the robes worn by cardinals.

Cardinal is a vivid red, which may get its name from the cassocks worn by Catholic cardinals (although the color worn by cardinals is scarlet). The cardinal bird also takes its name from the cardinal bishops.

The first recorded use of cardinal as a color name in English was in 1698.

== Cardinal in other color systems ==
The corresponding Pantone Matching System (PMS) color is 200, as seen in the school colors for Wisconsin, Arizona, and Wesleyan, and as one of the two official colors of the Phi Kappa Psi and Alpha Sigma Phi fraternities and the only official color of the sorority Alpha Omicron Pi. However, Stanford's variant of the color is 201 C, while Carnegie Mellon and Worcester Polytechnic Institute use PMS 187, Brown University uses PMS 192, Iowa State University uses PMS 186, and Ball State University uses PMS 199.

The hex triplet for the web-safe version of the color is #CC2233.

== Cardinal in culture ==
Fraternities

- Cardinal is used by the Alpha Sigma Phi, Phi Kappa Psi, and Phi Kappa Theta Fraternities as well as the Chi Omega and Alpha Omicron Pi Sororities.
  MIT Cardinal
  Color coordinates
  - Hex triplet: #A31F34
  - sRGB^{B} (r, g, b): (163, 31, 52)
  - HSV (h, s, v): (350°, 81%, 64%)
  - CIELCh_{uv} (L, C, h): (36, 94, 8°)
  - Source: MIT Graphic Identity
  - ISCC–NBS descriptor: Vivid red
  - B: Normalized to [0–255] (byte)

School colors

- Cardinal red and black are the colours of St Joseph's College, Gregory Terrace in Brisbane, Australia.
- Cardinal red and steel grey are the colors of Massachusetts Institute of Technology. It is also the official color of athletic team The Engineer and official mascot Tim Beaver.
- Cardinal and white are the official colors of Sierra College, a community college in Rocklin, California
- A brighter version of cardinal is the official color of Stanford University (although the athletic teams' official colors are cardinal and white, the university's athletic teams are called the Cardinal).
- Cardinal and gold are the official colors of the University of Southern California (USC) Trojans.
- Cardinal and white are the official colors of California State University, Chico.
  Stanford University Cardinal
  Color coordinates
  - Hex triplet: #8C1515
  - sRGB^{B} (r, g, b): (140, 21, 21)
  - HSV (h, s, v): (0°, 85%, 55%)
  - CIELCh_{uv} (L, C, h): (30, 87, 12°)
  - Source: Stanford University Identity Toolkit
  - ISCC–NBS descriptor: Strong reddish brown
  - B: Normalized to [0–255] (byte)
- Cardinal and grey are the official colors of La Trobe University, Melbourne, Australia. It is reflective of the tinctures gules and argent in its coat of arms.
- Cardinal is the official color of Sogang University, Seoul, South Korea. The university was established by the Society of Jesus.
- Cardinal is the official college color of University College, Durham - a college of Durham University in the United Kingdom - and is usually worn as the primary color of the college's many sports teams and societies, such as the football team, the hockey team and the boat club.
- Cardinal and gold are the official colors of Iowa State University, located in Ames, Iowa. The school's mascot, Cy, was chosen based on the school's main color, cardinal, since a cyclone mascot would have been difficult to design. A number of other universities use it as well.
  University of Southern California (USC) Cardinal
  Color coordinates
  - Hex triplet: #990000
  - sRGB^{B} (r, g, b): (153, 0, 0)
  - HSV (h, s, v): (0°, 100%, 60%)
  - CIELCh_{uv} (L, C, h): (31, 105, 12°)
  - Source: USC Identity Guidelines
  - ISCC–NBS descriptor: Vivid red
  - B: Normalized to [0–255] (byte)
- Cardinal and white are the official colors of the University of Arkansas Razorbacks. Prior to adoption of the Razorback as the mascot, the university's sports teams were known as the Cardinals.
- Cardinal and black are the official colors of Wesleyan University, and the school's athletic teams are called the Cardinals.
- Cardinal, gold, and blue are the school colors for Scotch College, Melbourne.
- Cardinal and blue are the official school colors of California State University, Fresno.
- Other school colors described as cardinal include those of the University of Arizona, Ball State University, Brown University, Carnegie Mellon University, Chadron State College, Chaminade College Preparatory (Missouri), Chapman University, Fairfield University, Massachusetts College of Pharmacy and Health Sciences, Nicholls State University, New Mexico State University, Oberlin College, Stevens Institute of Technology, Troy University, the University of Southern California, Union University, Willamette University, University of Wisconsin–Madison, City College of San Francisco, Santa Clara University, and Hanover High School (New Hampshire).

Fresno State Cardinal

Color coordinates
- Hex triplet: #C41230
- sRGB^{B} (r, g, b): (196, 18, 48)
- HSV (h, s, v): (350°, 91%, 77%)
- CIELCh_{uv} (L, C, h): (42, 125, 9°)
- Source: Fresno State Branding Standards
- ISCC–NBS descriptor: Vivid red
- B: Normalized to [0–255] (byte)

Sports

- Cardinal is 1 of 2 primary colors with myrtle a.k.a. green & red for the 21-time premiership winners South Sydney Rabbitohs.
- Cardinal is the official primary color of baseball's St. Louis Cardinals.
- Cardinal was formerly one of the colors of the San Francisco 49ers (since reverted to scarlet), along with the color California gold.
- Cardinal is the official color of American football's Arizona Cardinals (who were formerly in Chicago, then St. Louis).
- Cardinal is the official color of Marlow Rowing Club in the UK.
- Cardinal is the official color, and nickname of Woking FC in the UK.
- Cardinal is the official color of the Claremont-Mudd-Scripps Stags and Athenas, the combined sports programs of Claremont McKenna College, Harvey Mudd College and Scripps College.

== See also ==
- List of colors
