= Cy the Cardinal =

Mascot of Iowa State University

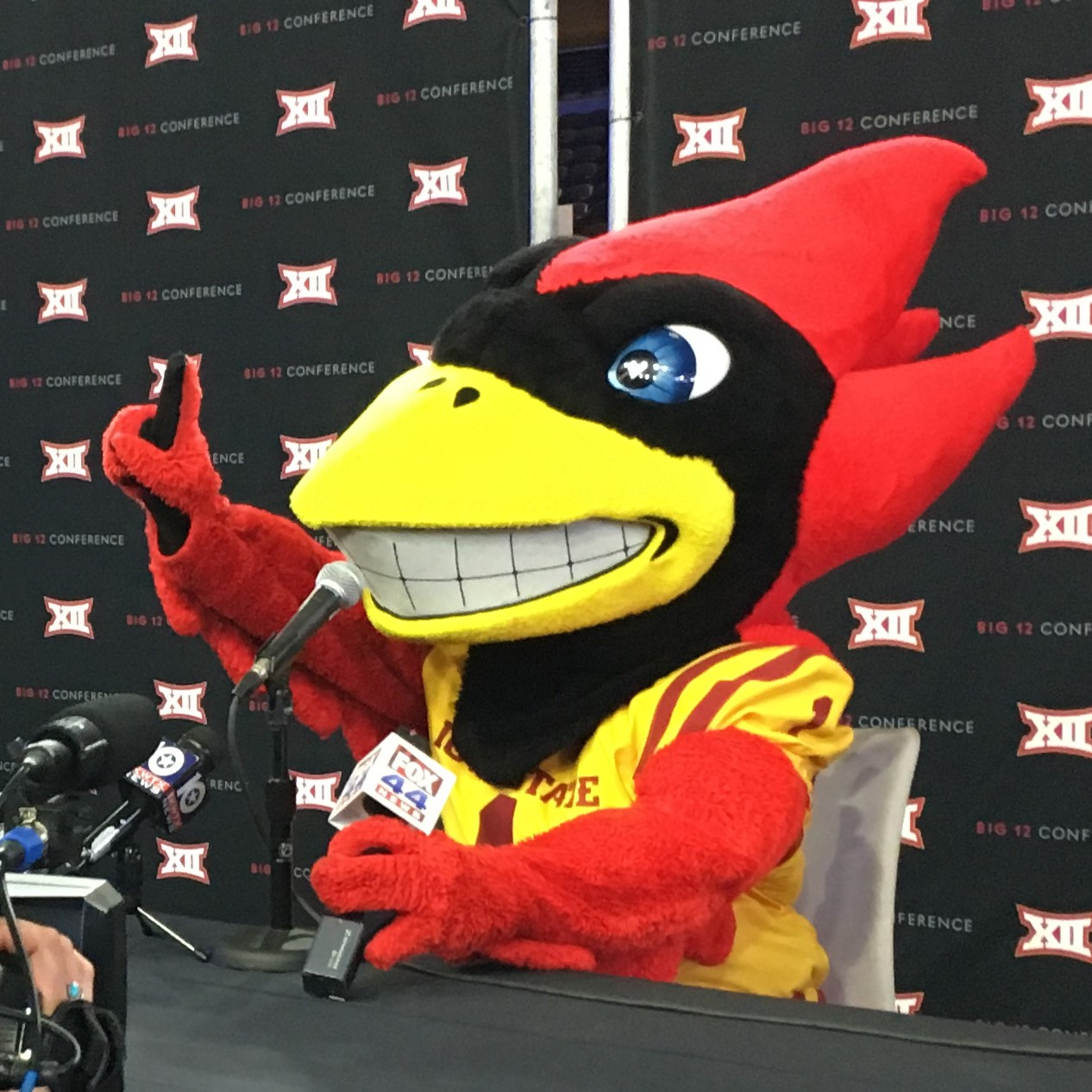
- Cy the Cardinal 2018 Big 12 Media Days
- University: Iowa State University
- Conference: Big 12
- Description: Cyclones
- First seen: 1954

Cy logo

Cy the Cardinal is the mascot of Iowa State University's sports teams.

Iowa State became the Cyclones after a series of tornadoes (then called cyclones) ravaged the area in 1898. Because a cyclone was difficult to depict in costume, a cardinal was selected from the cardinal and gold of the official school colors. A cardinal-like bird was introduced at the 1954 homecoming pep rally. A contest was conducted to select a name for the mascot, and the winning entry of Cy was submitted by 17 people. The first to submit the name, Mrs. Wilma Ohlsen, won a cardinal and gold stadium blanket.

Over the last half century, Cy has undergone several makeovers and redesigns. The first Cy was approximately 8 feet (2.4 m) tall with a bulging chest made mostly from chicken wire and aluminum. Cy was again transformed when ISU Athletics changed the school's logo and color combinations.

Due to the size and weight of the original costume, there were some physical requirements for students who wanted to fill the role of Cy. Applicants needed to be 5’11” (180.3 cm) to 6’2” (188 cm) and weigh 175 to 210 pounds (79.4 to 95.25 kg). When Cy first was introduced, only one student served as Cy. Now Cy is performing in public about 200 days a year, and four to six students share mascot duties. Today, physical attributes are not as important because the costume is available in three sizes.

Cy makes appearances at various Cyclone sporting events such as football, men's and women's basketball, volleyball, wrestling, soccer, softball, and gymnastics. In addition to sporting events, Cy is often requested to make various appearances across the state of Iowa for a number of events. Cy also competes each year at the NCAA College Mascot Nationals in Daytona Beach, Florida.

== Recognition ==
Cy has won two national mascot challenges since 2007; the CBS Sportsline Most Dominant College Mascot on Earth in 2007, and the CapitalOne Bowl National Mascot of the Year in 2008.

== See also ==
- List of U.S. college mascots
