= Iowa State University College of Business =

Coordinates: 42.02504°N 93.64441°W

Debbie and Jerry Ivy College of Business
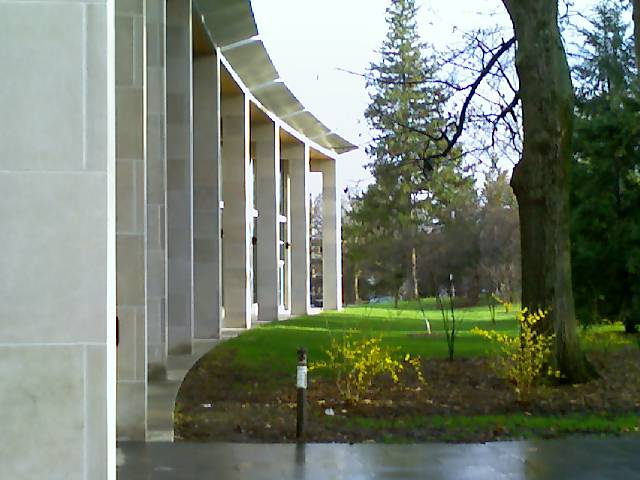
- Established: 1984
- Dean: Raj Agnihotri
- Location: Ames, Iowa
- Affiliations: Iowa State University
- Website: business.iastate.edu

Iowa State University's Debbie and Jerry Ivy College of Business was established in 1984, and is accredited by AACSB International – The Association to Advance Collegiate Schools of Business. The college consists of six departments offering 13 bachelor's degrees and 8 post graduate degrees.

== History ==
Although Iowa State University had offered courses in business since the 1920s, the College of Business was only established in 1984. In the 1920s, business courses were held under the Department of Economics. After some name changes, the Department of Industrial Administration was created in 1955, and became a part of the College of Humanities and Sciences in 1958. In 1980, the School of Business Administration was formed which was renamed the College of Business Administration in 1984. The college was renamed to the College of Business in 1991. On October 19, 2017 the college was officially renamed the Debbie and Jerry Ivy College of Business.

== Academics ==
=== Departments ===
- Accounting
- Finance
- Management and Entrepreneurship
- Marketing
- Supply Chain
- Information Systems and Business Analytics

=== Centers ===
- Iowa Small Business Development Center
- ISU Pappajohn Center for Entrepreneurship
- Murray G. Bacon Center of AI Ethics in Business

== Facilities ==
The Gerdin Business Building located on the Iowa State University Campus is the home of the Ivy College of Business. Completed in 2003, the building is named after Russell and Ann Gerdin, the lead donors for the construction of the new business building.
