= Iowa State University =

Public university in Ames, Iowa, US

Iowa State University of Science and Technology
- Former names: Iowa Agricultural College and Model Farm (1858–1898); Iowa State College of Agriculture and Mechanic Arts (1898–1959)
- Motto: "Science with Practice"
- Type: Public land-grant research university
- Established: March 22, 1858; 168 years ago
- Parent institution: Iowa Board of Regents
- Accreditation: HLC
- Academic affiliations: ORAU; URA; Space-grant
- Endowment: $1.915 billion (2025)
- President: David Cook
- Provost: Jason Keith
- Faculty: 1,746 (2023)
- Students: 31,105 (fall 2025)
- Undergraduates: 26,346 (fall 2025)
- Postgraduates: 4,116 (fall 2025)
- Other students: 1,243 (fall 2025)
- Location: Ames, Iowa, United States; 42.0262°N 93.6480°W
- Campus: 1,813 acres (7.34 km^{2}); Small city
- Newspaper: Iowa State Daily
- Colors: Cardinal and gold
- Nickname: Cyclones
- Sporting affiliations: NCAA Division I FBS – Big 12
- Mascot: Cy the Cardinal
- Website: iastate.edu

The Iowa State University of Science and Technology, also referred to as Iowa State University (Iowa State or ISU), is a public land-grant research university in Ames, Iowa, United States. Founded in 1858 as the Iowa Agricultural College and Model Farm, Iowa State became one of the nation's first designated land-grant institutions when the Iowa Legislature accepted the provisions of the 1862 Morrill Act on September 11, 1862. On July 4, 1959, the college was officially renamed Iowa State University of Science and Technology.

Iowa State is the second largest university in Iowa by total enrollment. The university's academic offerings are administered through eight colleges, including the College of Agriculture and Life Sciences, the College of Veterinary Medicine, the College of Engineering, the Graduate College, the College of Liberal Arts & Sciences, the College of Design, Debbie and Jerry Ivy College of Business, and the College of Health and Human Sciences. They offer more than 100 bachelor's degree programs, 120 master's degree programs, and 80 doctoral degree programs, plus a professional degree program in Veterinary Medicine.

Iowa State is classified among "R1: Doctoral Universities – Very high research activity." The university is affiliated with the Ames National Laboratory, the Biorenewables Research Laboratory, the Plant Sciences Institute, and various other research institutes. Iowa State University's athletic teams, the Cyclones, compete in Division I of the NCAA and are a founding member of the Big 12.

== History ==
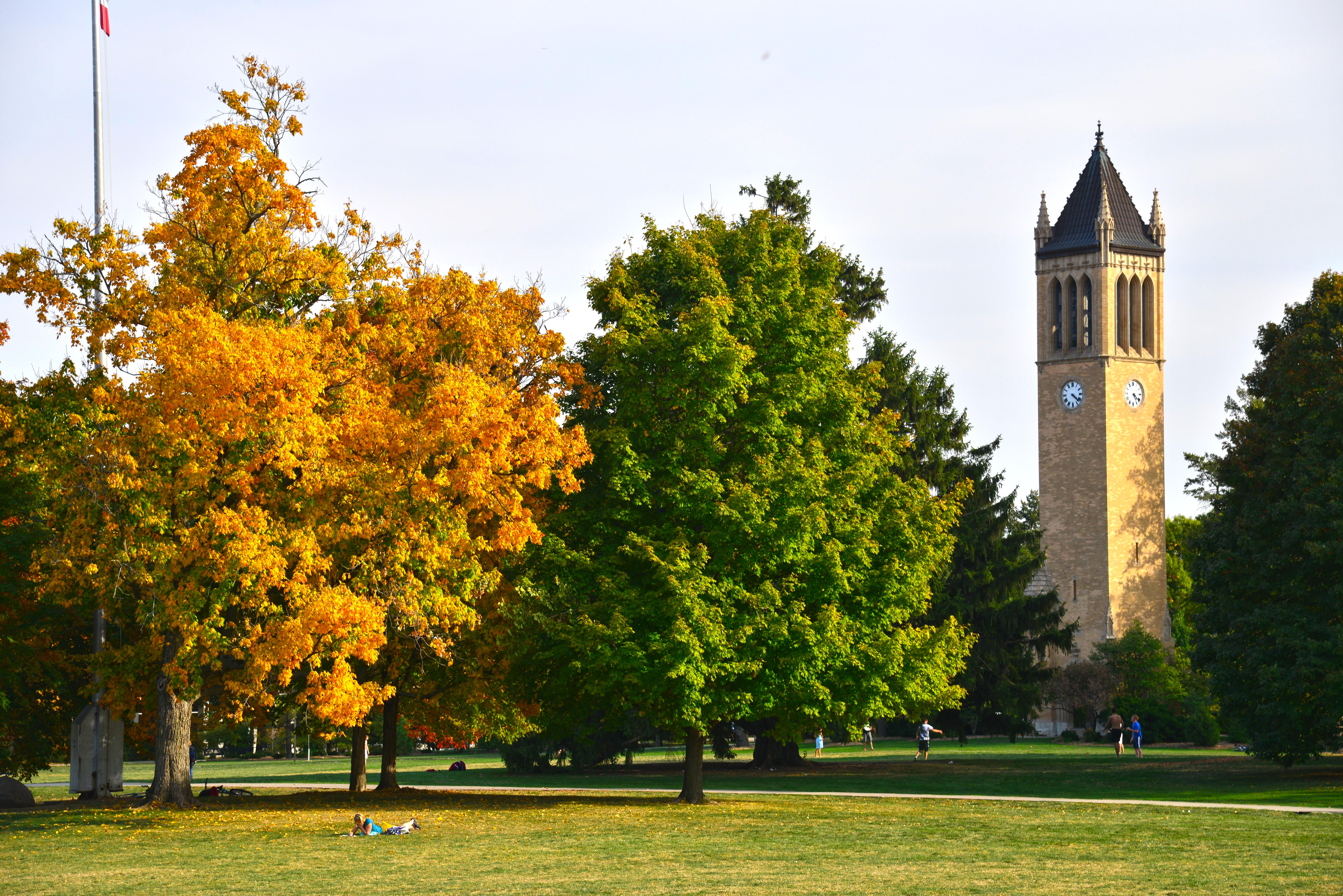
The Campanile and lawn

In 1856, the Iowa General Assembly enacted legislation to establish the Iowa Agricultural College and Model Farm. This institution (now Iowa State University) was officially established on March 22, 1858, by the General Assembly. Story County was chosen as the location on June 21, 1859, beating proposals from Johnson, Kossuth, Marshall and Polk counties. The original farm of 648 acres (2.62 km^{2}) was purchased at a cost of $5,379.

Iowa was the first state in the nation to accept the provisions of the Morrill Act of 1862. The state subsequently designated Iowa State as the land-grant college on March 29, 1864. Iowa State University is one of four universities that claims to be the first land-grant institution in the United States, the others being Kansas State University, Michigan State University, and the Pennsylvania State University.

From the start, Iowa Agricultural College focused on the ideals that higher education should be accessible to all and that the university should teach liberal and practical subjects. These ideals are integral to the land-grant university.

The institution has been coeducational since the first class admitted in 1868. Formal admissions began the following year, and the first graduating class of 1872 consisted of 24 men and two women.

The Farm House, the first building on the Iowa State campus, was completed in 1861 before the campus was occupied by students or classrooms. It became the home of the superintendent of the Model Farm and in later years, the deans of Agriculture, including Seaman Knapp and James "Tama Jim" Wilson. Iowa State's first president, Adonijah Welch, briefly stayed at the Farm House and penned his inaugural speech in a second floor bedroom.

The Iowa Experiment Station was one of the university's prominent features. Practical courses of instruction were taught, including one designed to give a general training for the career of a farmer. Courses in mechanical, civil, electrical, and mining engineering were also part of the curriculum.

In 1870, President Welch and I. P. Roberts, professor of agriculture, held three-day farmers' institutes at Cedar Falls, Council Bluffs, Washington, and Muscatine. These became the earliest institutes held off-campus by a land grant institution and were the forerunners of 20th century extension.

In 1872, the first courses were given in domestic economy (home economics, family and consumer sciences) and were taught by Mary B. Welch, the president's wife. Iowa State became the first land grant university to offer training in domestic economy for college credit.

In 1879, the School of Veterinary Science was organized, becoming the first state veterinary college in the United States. This was originally a two-year course leading to a diploma. The veterinary course of study contained classes in zoology, botany, anatomy of domestic animals, veterinary obstetrics, and sanitary science.

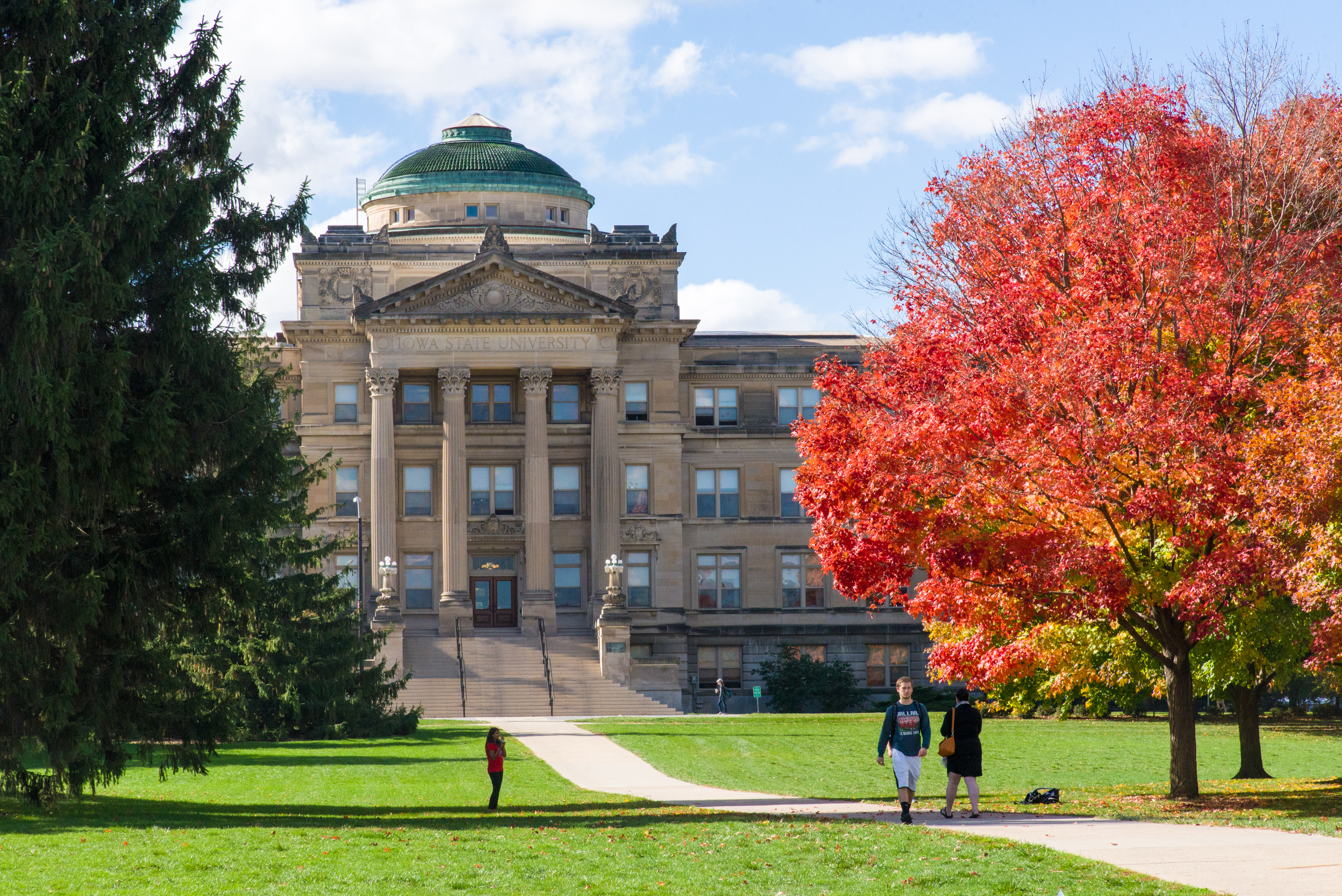
Beardshear Hall

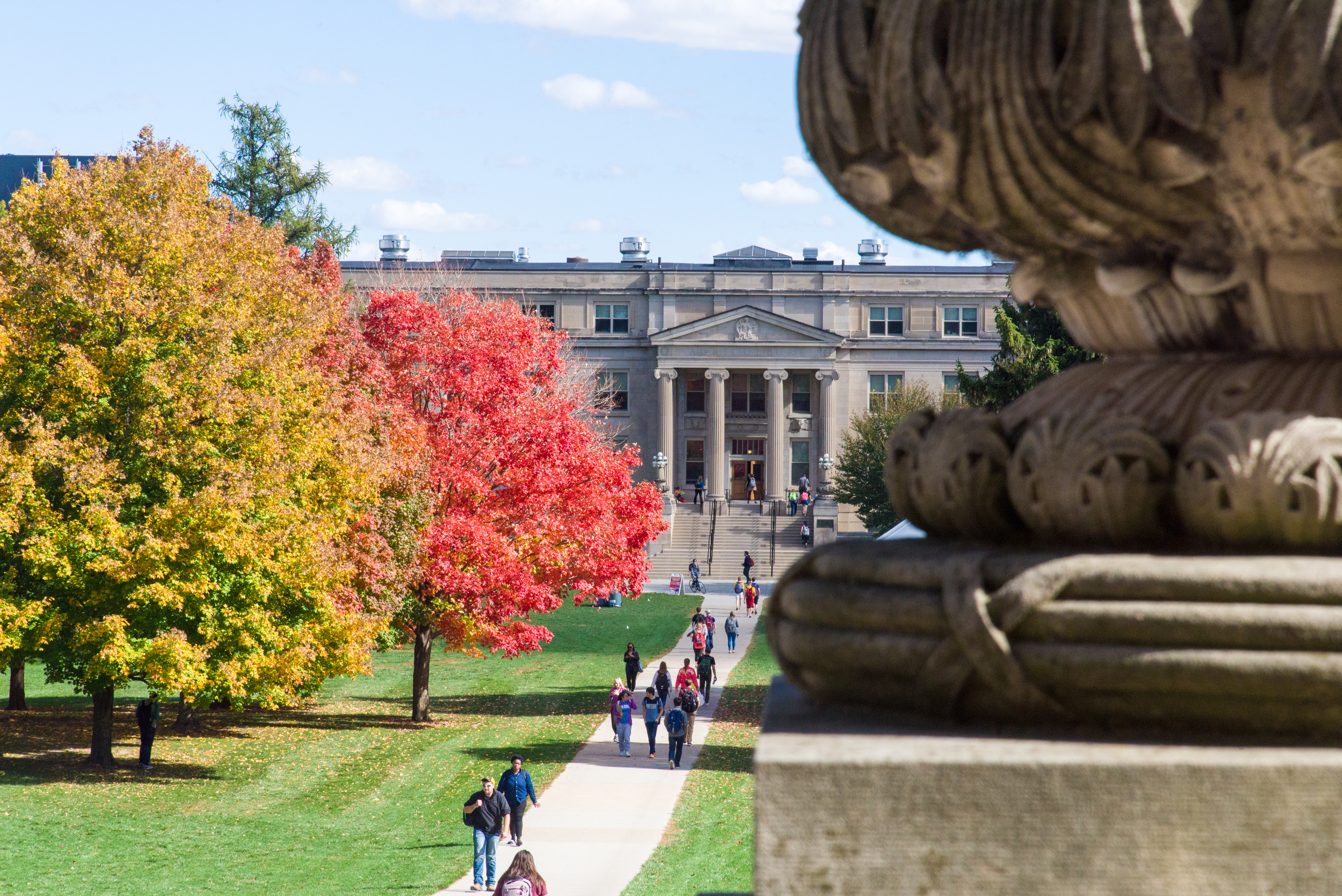
Curtiss Hall

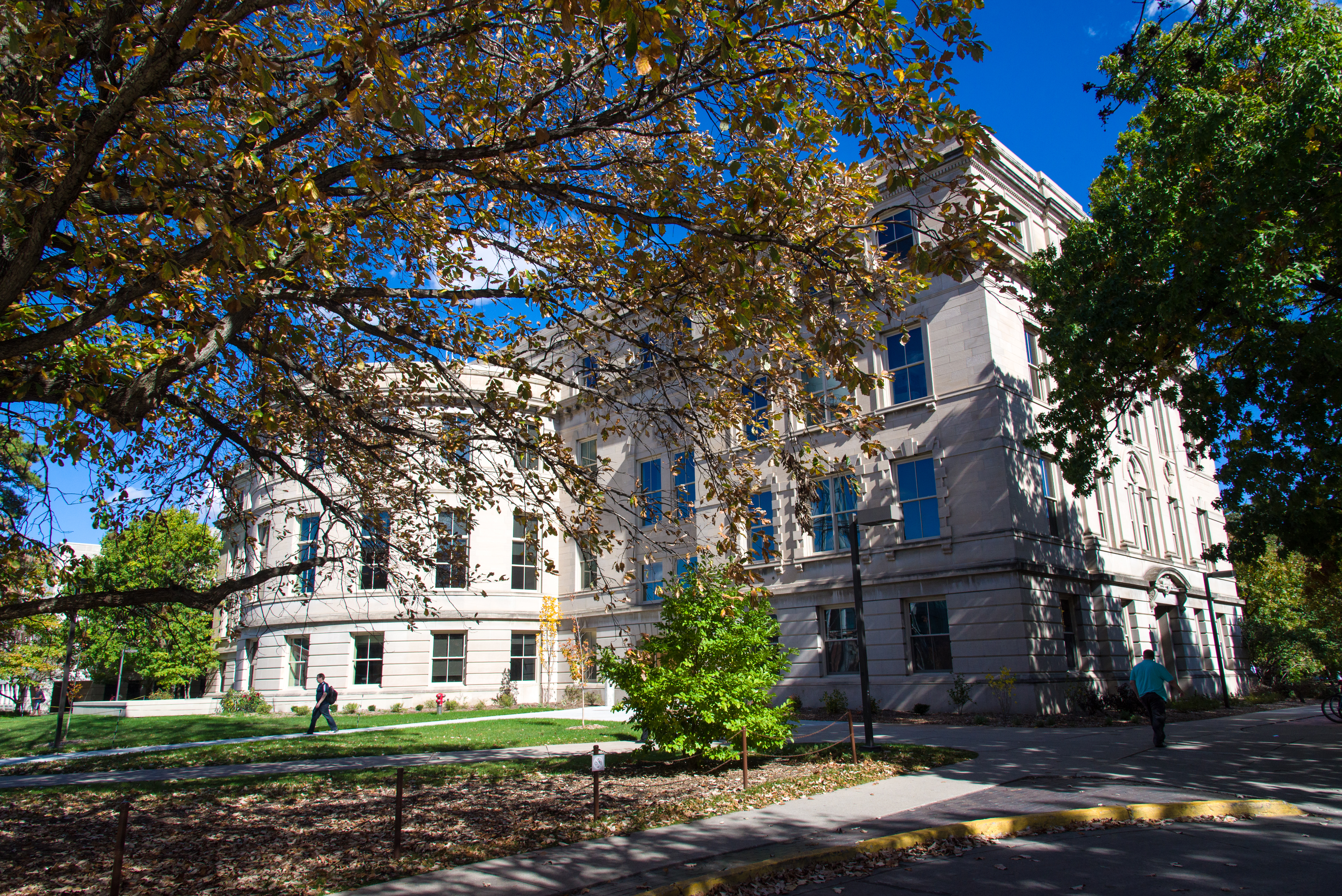
Marston Hall

William Miller Beardshear was appointed President of Iowa State in 1891. During his tenure, Iowa Agricultural College truly came of age. Beardshear developed new agricultural programs and was instrumental in hiring premier faculty members such as Anson Marston, Louis B. Spinney, J. B. Weems, Perry G. Holden, and Maria Roberts. He also expanded the university administration, and added Morrill Hall (1891), the Campanile (1899), Old Botany (now Carrie Chapman Catt Hall) (1892), and Margaret Hall (1895) to the campus, all of which stand today except for Margaret Hall, which was destroyed by a fire in 1938. In his honor, Iowa State named its central administrative building (Central Building) after Beardshear in 1925. In 1898, reflecting the school's growth during his tenure, it was renamed Iowa State College of Agricultural and Mechanic Arts, or Iowa State for short.

Today, Beardshear Hall holds the offices of the President, Vice-President, Treasurer, Secretary, Provost, and student financial aid. Catt Hall is named after alumna and famed suffragette Carrie Chapman Catt, and is the home of the College of Liberal Arts and Sciences.

In 1912, Iowa State had its first Homecoming celebration. The idea was first proposed by Professor Samuel Beyer, the college's "patron saint of athletics", who suggested that Iowa State inaugurate a celebration for alumni during the annual football game against rival University of Iowa. Iowa State's new president, Raymond A. Pearson, liked the idea and issued a special invitation to alumni two weeks prior to the event: "We need you, we must have you. Come and see what a school you have made in Iowa State College. Find a way." In October 2012 Iowa State marked its 100th Homecoming with a "CYtennial" Celebration.

Iowa State celebrated its first VEISHEA on May 11–13, 1922. Wallace McKee (class of 1922) served as the first chairman of the Central Committee and Frank D. Paine (professor of electrical engineering) chose the name, based on the first letters of Iowa State's colleges: Veterinary Medicine, Engineering, Industrial Science, Home Economics, and Agriculture. VEISHEA grew to become the largest student-run festival in the nation.

The Statistical Laboratory was established in 1933, with George W. Snedecor, professor of mathematics, as the first director. It was and is the first research and consulting institute of its kind in the country.

While attempting to develop a faster method of computation, mathematics and physics professor John Vincent Atanasoff conceptualized the basic tenets of what would become the world's first electronic digital computer, the Atanasoff–Berry Computer (ABC), during a drive to Illinois in 1937. These included the use of a binary system of arithmetic, the separation of computer and memory functions, and regenerative drum memory, among others. The 1939 prototype was constructed with graduate student Clifford Berry in the basement of the Physics Building.

During World War II, Iowa State was one of 131 colleges and universities nationally that took part in the V-12 Navy College Training Program which offered students a path to a Navy commission.

On July 4, 1959, the college was officially renamed Iowa State University of Science and Technology. However, as a practical matter, the institution's name is simply Iowa State University. By longstanding convention, the "Science and Technology" portion is omitted even in official documents, such as diplomas. Official names given to the university's divisions were the College of Agriculture, College of Engineering, College of Home Economics, College of Sciences and Humanities, and College of Veterinary Medicine.

Iowa State's eight colleges today offer more than 100 undergraduate majors and 200 fields of study leading to graduate and professional degrees. The academic program at ISU includes a liberal arts education and research in the biological and physical sciences. The focus on technology has led directly to many research patents and inventions including the first binary computer, the ABC, Maytag blue cheese, and the round hay baler.

Located on a 2,000 acres (8.1 km^{2}) campus, the university has grown considerably from its roots as an agricultural college and model farm and is recognized internationally today for its comprehensive research programs. It continues to grow and set a new record for enrollment in the fall of 2015 with 36,001 students.

=== Manhattan Project ===
Iowa State played a role in the development of the atomic bomb during World War II as part of the Manhattan Project, a research and development program begun in 1942 under the Army Corps of Engineers.

The process to produce large quantities of high-purity uranium metal became known as the Ames process. One-third of the uranium metal used in the world's first controlled nuclear chain reaction was produced at Iowa State under the direction of Frank Spedding and Harley Wilhelm. The Ames Project received the Army/Navy E Award for Excellence in Production on October 12, 1945, for its work with metallic uranium as a vital war material. Today, ISU is the only university in the United States that has a U.S. Department of Energy research laboratory physically located on its campus.

=== Atanasoff–Berry Computer ===
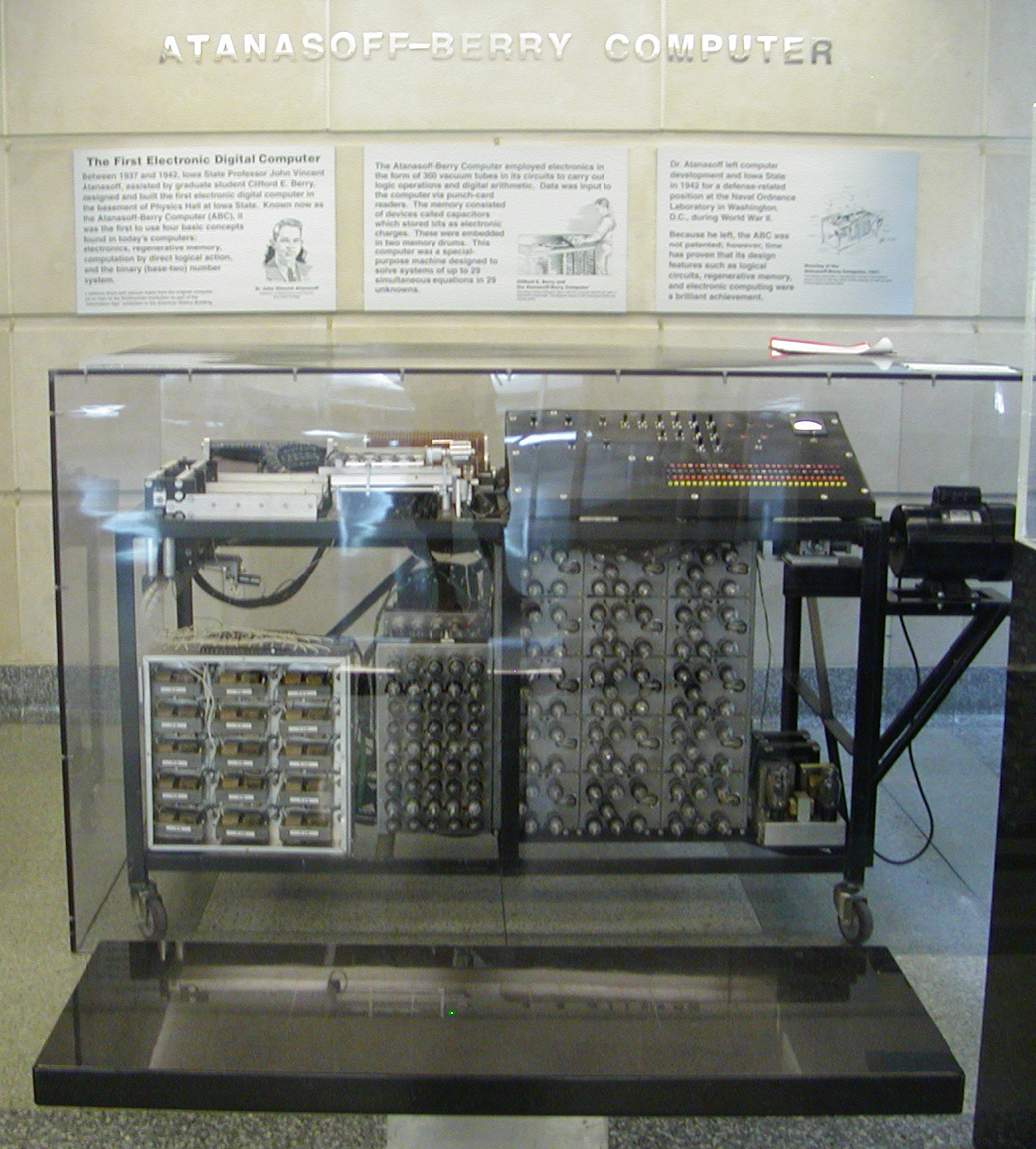
Atanasoff–Berry Computer replica on first floor of Durham Center, Iowa State University

Iowa State is the birthplace of the first electronic digital computer, starting the world's computer technology revolution. Invented by mathematics and physics professor John Atanasoff and engineering graduate student Clifford Berry during 1937–42, the Atanasoff–Berry Computer pioneered important elements of modern computing.

On October 19, 1973, U.S. Federal Judge Earl R. Larson signed his decision following a lengthy court trial which declared the ENIAC patent of Mauchly and Eckert invalid and named Atanasoff the inventor of the electronic digital computer—the Atanasoff–Berry Computer or the ABC.

An ABC Team consisting of Ames Laboratory and Iowa State engineers, technicians, researchers and students unveiled a working replica of the Atanasoff–Berry Computer in 1997 which can be seen on display on campus in the Durham Computation Center.

== Campus ==
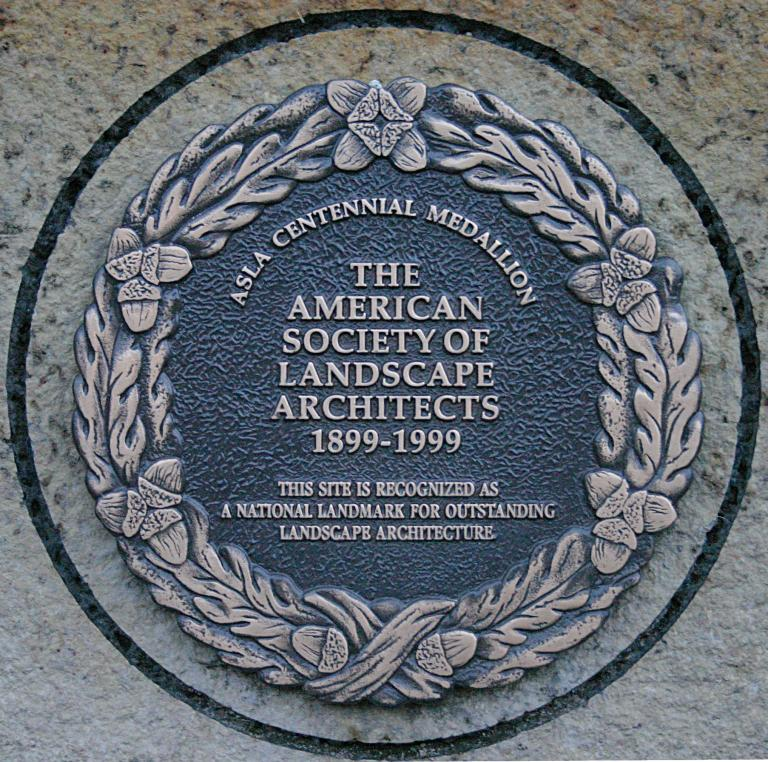
The medallion located in Central Campus, immediately to the west of Curtiss Hall

Iowa State's campus contains over 160 buildings. Several buildings, as well as the Marston Water Tower, are listed on the National Register of Historic Places. The central campus includes 490 acres (2.0 km^{2}) of trees, plants, and classically designed buildings. The landscape's most dominant feature is the 20-acre (81,000 m^{2}) central lawn, which was listed as a "medallion site" by the American Society of Landscape Architects in 1999.

Thomas Gaines, in The Campus As a Work of Art, claimed that the Iowa State campus was one of the twenty-five most beautiful campuses in the country.

=== Campanile ===
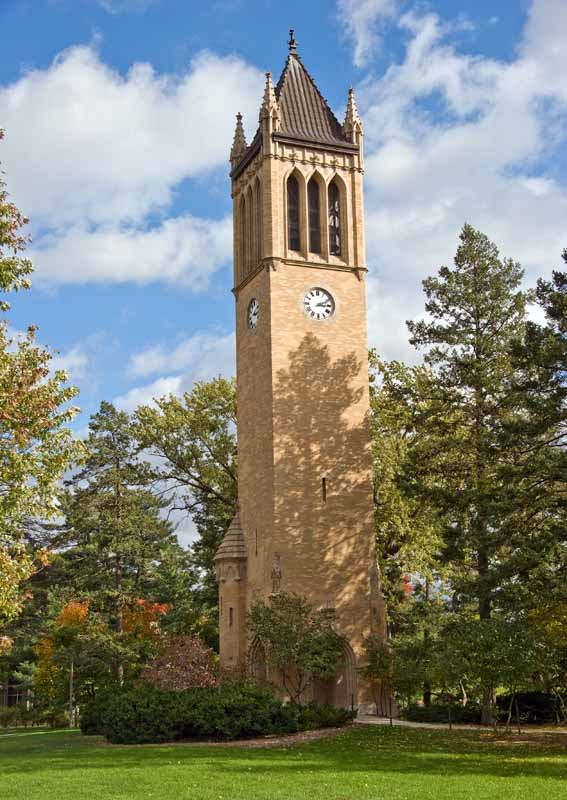
The campanile as seen from the north

The campanile was constructed during 1897–1898 as a memorial to Margaret MacDonald Stanton, Iowa State's first dean of women, who died on July 25, 1895. The tower is located on ISU's central campus, just north of the Memorial Union. The site was selected by Margaret's husband, Edgar W. Stanton, with the help of then-university president William M. Beardshear. The campanile stands 110 feet (34 m) tall on a 16 by 16 foot (5 by 5 m) base, and cost $6,510.20 to construct.

The campanile is widely seen as one of the major symbols of Iowa State University. It is featured prominently on the university's official ring and the university's mace, and is also the subject of the university's alma mater, The Bells of Iowa State.

=== Lake LaVerne ===
Named for LaVerne W. Noyes, who graduated in 1872, and later donated the funds to see that Alumni Hall could be completed after sitting unfinished and unused from 1905 to 1907. Lake LaVerne is located west of the Memorial Union and south of Alumni Hall, Carver Hall, and Music Hall. The lake was a gift from Noyes in 1916.

Lake LaVerne is the home of two mute swans named Sir Lancelot and Elaine, donated to Iowa State by VEISHEA 1935. In 1944, 1970, and 1971 cygnets (baby swans) made their home on Lake LaVerne. Previously Sir Lancelot and Elaine were trumpeter swans but were too aggressive and in 1999 were replaced with two mute swans.

In early spring 2003, Lake LaVerne welcomed its newest and most current mute swan duo. In support of Iowa Department of Natural Resources efforts to re-establish the trumpeter swans in Iowa, university officials avoided bringing breeding pairs of male and female mute swans to Iowa State which means the current Sir Lancelot and Elaine are both female.

=== Reiman Gardens ===
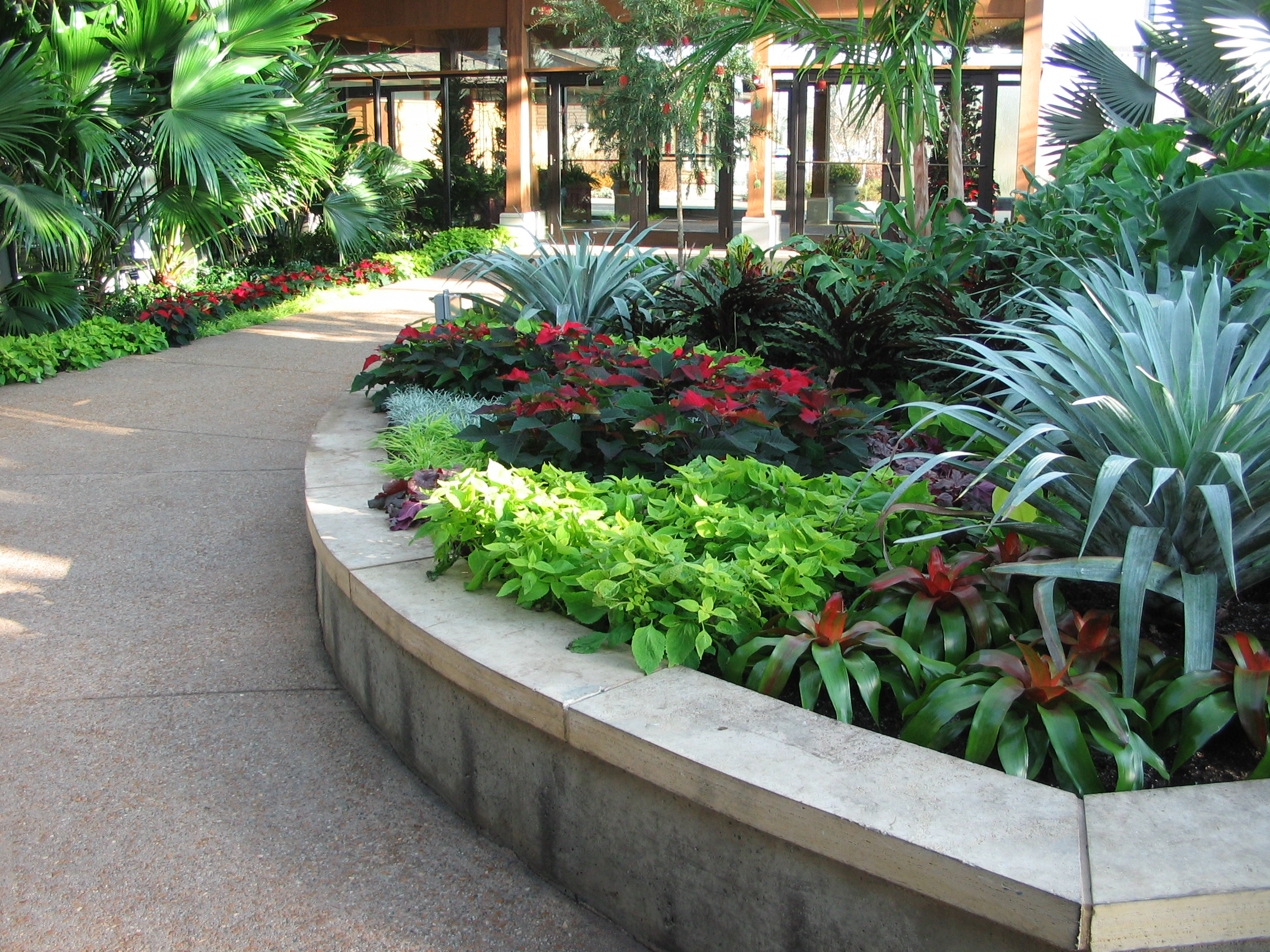
Tropical conservatory, Reiman Gardens

Iowa State has maintained a horticulture garden since 1914. Reiman Gardens is the third location for these gardens. Today's gardens began in 1993 with a gift from Bobbi and Roy Reiman. Construction began in 1994 and the Gardens' initial 5 acres (20,000 m^{2}) were officially dedicated on September 16, 1995.

Reiman Gardens has since grown to become a 14 acres (57,000 m^{2}) site consisting of a dozen distinct garden areas, an indoor conservatory and an indoor butterfly "wing", butterfly emergence cases, a gift shop, and several supporting greenhouses. Located immediately south of Jack Trice Stadium on the ISU campus, Reiman Gardens is a year-round facility that has become one of the most visited attractions in central Iowa.

The Gardens has received a number of national, state, and local awards since its opening, and its rose gardens are particularly noteworthy. It was honored with the President's Award in 2000 by All American Rose Selections, Inc., which is presented to one public garden in the United States each year for superior rose maintenance and display: "For contributing to the public interest in rose growing through its efforts in maintaining an outstanding public rose garden."

=== University museums ===
The university museums consist of the Brunnier Art Museum, Farm House Museum, the Art on Campus Program, the Christian Petersen Art Museum, and the Elizabeth and Byron Anderson Sculpture Garden.

==== Brunnier Art Museum ====
The Brunnier Art Museum, Iowa's only accredited museum emphasizing a decorative arts collection, is one of the nation's few museums located within a performing arts and conference complex, the Iowa State Center. Founded in 1975, the museum is named after its benefactors, Iowa State alumnus Henry J. Brunnier and his wife Ann. The decorative arts collection they donated, called the Brunnier Collection, is extensive, consisting of ceramics, glass, dolls, ivory, jade, and enameled metals.

Other fine and decorative art objects from the University Art Collection include prints, paintings, sculptures, textiles, carpets, wood objects, lacquered pieces, silver, and furniture. About eight to 12 annual changing exhibitions and permanent collection exhibitions provide educational opportunities. Lectures, receptions, conferences, university classes, panel discussions, gallery walks, and gallery talks are presented to assist with further interpretation of objects.

==== Farm House Museum ====
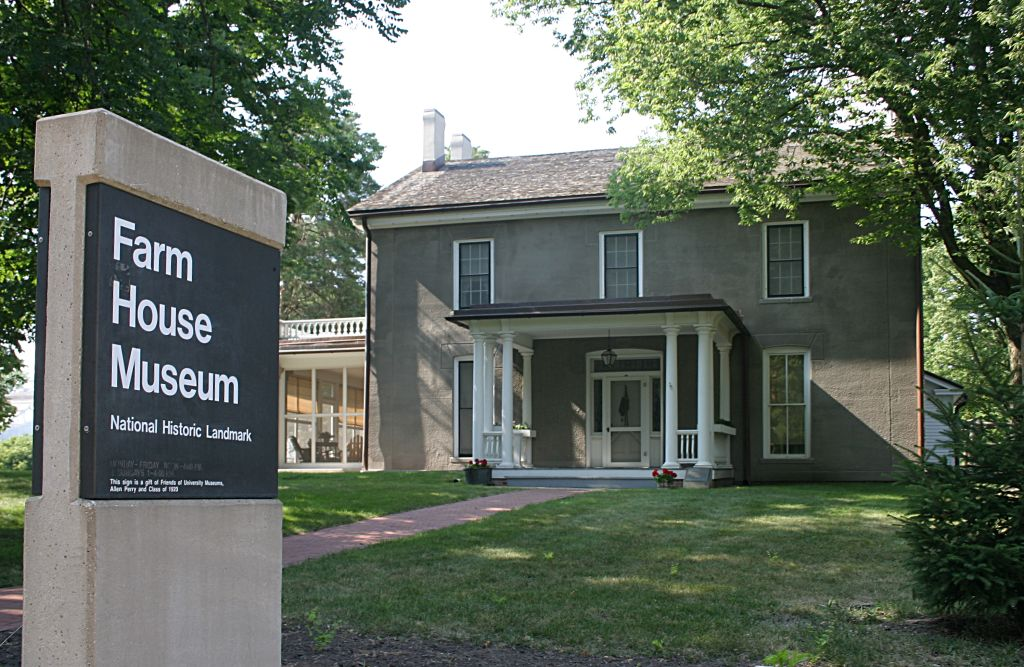
The Farm House Museum

Located near the center of the Iowa State campus, the Farm House Museum sits as a monument to early Iowa State history and culture as well as a National Historic Landmark. As the first building on campus, the Farm House was built in 1860 before campus was occupied by students or even classrooms. The college's first farm tenants primed the land for agricultural experimentation. This early practice lead to Iowa State Agricultural College and Model Farm opening its doors to Iowa students for free in 1869 under the Morrill Act (or Land-grant Act) of 1862.

Many prominent figures have made the Farm House their home throughout its 150 years of use. The first president of the college, Adonijah Welch, briefly stayed at the Farm House and even wrote his inaugural speech in a bedroom on the second floor. James "Tama Jim" Wilson resided for much of the 1890s with his family at the Farm House until he joined President William McKinley's cabinet as U.S. Secretary of Agriculture. Agriculture Dean Charles Curtiss and his young family replaced Wilson and became the longest resident of Farm House.

In 1976, over 110 years after the initial construction, the Farm House became a museum after much time and effort was put into restoring the early beauty of the modest farm home. Today, faculty, students, and community members can enjoy the museum while honoring its significance in shaping a nationally recognized land-grant university. Its collection boasts a large collection of 19th and early 20th century decorative arts, furnishings and material culture reflecting Iowa State and Iowa heritage. Objects include furnishings from Carrie Chapman Catt and Charles Curtiss, a wide variety of quilts, a modest collection of textiles and apparel, and various china and glassware items.

The Farm House Museum is an on-campus educational resource providing a changing environment of exhibitions among the historical permanent collection objects that are on display.

==== Art on Campus Collection ====
Iowa State is home to one of the largest campus public art programs in the United States. Over 2,000 works of public art, including 600 by significant national and international artists, are located across campus in buildings, courtyards, open spaces and offices.

The traditional public art program began during the Depression in the 1930s when Iowa State College's President Raymond Hughes envisioned that "the arts would enrich and provide substantial intellectual exploration into our college curricula." Hughes invited Grant Wood to create the Library's agricultural murals that speak to the founding of Iowa and Iowa State College and Model Farm. He also offered Christian Petersen a one-semester sculptor residency to design and build the fountain and bas relief at the Dairy Industry Building. In 1955, 21 years later, Petersen retired having created 12 major sculptures for the campus and hundreds of small studio sculptures.

The Art on Campus Collection is a campus-wide resource of over 2000 public works of art. Programs, receptions, dedications, university classes, Wednesday Walks, and educational tours are presented on a regular basis.

==== Christian Petersen Art Museum ====
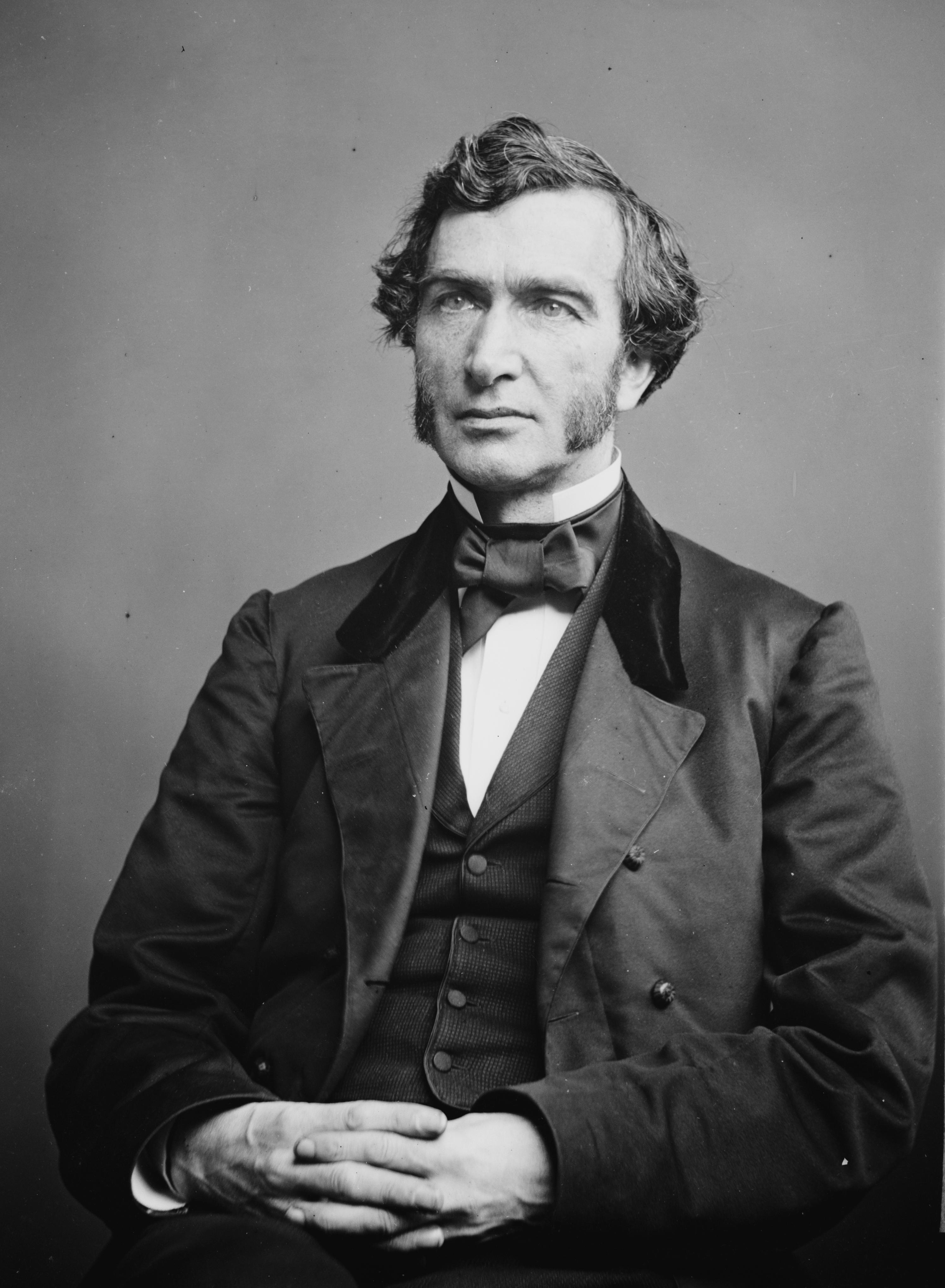
Justin Smith Morrill, namesake of Morrill Hall

The Christian Petersen Art Museum in Morrill Hall is named for the nation's first permanent campus artist-in-residence, Christian Petersen, who sculpted and taught at Iowa State from 1934 through 1955, and is considered the founding artist of the Art on Campus Collection.

Named for Justin Smith Morrill who created the Morrill Land-Grant Colleges Act, Morrill Hall was completed in 1891. Originally constructed to fill the capacity of a library, museum, and chapel, its original uses are engraved in the exterior stonework on the east side. The building was vacated in 1996 when it was determined unsafe and was also listed in the National Register of Historic Places the same year. In 2005, $9 million was raised to renovate the building and convert it into a museum. Completed and reopened in March 2007, Morrill Hall is home to the Christian Petersen Art Museum.

As part of University Museums, the Christian Petersen Art Museum at Morrill Hall is the home of the Christian Petersen Art Collection, the Art on Campus Program, the University Museums's Visual Literacy and Learning Program, and Contemporary Changing Art Exhibitions Program.

Located within the Christian Petersen Art Museum are the Lyle and Nancy Campbell Art Gallery, the Roy and Bobbi Reiman Public Art Studio Gallery, the Margaret Davidson Center for the Study of the Art on Campus Collection, the Edith D. and Torsten E. Lagerstrom Loaned Collections Center, and the Neva M. Petersen Visual Learning Gallery. University Museums shares the James R. and Barbara R. Palmer Small Objects Classroom in Morrill Hall.

==== Anderson Sculpture Garden ====
The Elizabeth and Byron Anderson Sculpture Garden is located by the Christian Petersen Art Museum at historic Morrill Hall. The sculpture garden design incorporates sculptures, a gathering arena, and sidewalks and pathways. Planted with perennials, ground cover, shrubs, and flowering trees, the landscape design provides a setting for works of 20th and 21st century sculpture, primarily American. Ranging from forty-four inches to nearly nine feet high and from bronze to other metals, these works of art represent both modern and contemporary sculpture.

The sculpture garden is adjacent to Iowa State's 22 acres (89,000 m^{2}) central campus.

=== Sustainability ===
Iowa State's composting facility is capable of processing over 10,000 tons of organic waste every year. The school's $3 million revolving loan fund loans money for energy efficiency and conservation projects on campus. In the 2011 College Sustainability Report Card issued by the Sustainable Endowments Institute, the university received a B grade.

== Academics ==
College/school founding
College/school	Year founded
College of Agriculture and Life Sciences	1858
College of Veterinary Medicine	1879
College of Engineering	1904
Graduate College	1913
College of Liberal Arts & Sciences	1959
College of Design	1978
Ivy College of Business	1984
College of Human Sciences	2005

=== Colleges and schools ===
Iowa State University is organized into eight colleges and two schools that offer 100 Bachelor's degree programs, 112 Masters programs, and 83 Ph.D programs, including one professional degree program in Veterinary Medicine.

ISU is home to the following schools:

- Greenlee School of Journalism and Mass Communication (within the College of Liberal Arts and Sciences)
- School of Education (within the College of Human Sciences)

=== Rankings ===
Academic rankings

National
- Forbes: 146
- U.S. News & World Report: 117 (tie)
- Washington Monthly: 238
- WSJ/College Pulse: 141

Global
- ARWU: 401–500
- QS: 449
- THE: 401–500
- U.S. News & World Report: 380 (tie)

Classified as one of Carnegie's "R1: Doctoral Universities - Very High Research Activity," Iowa State received nearly $550 million in research grants for fiscal year 2025.

=== Parks Library ===
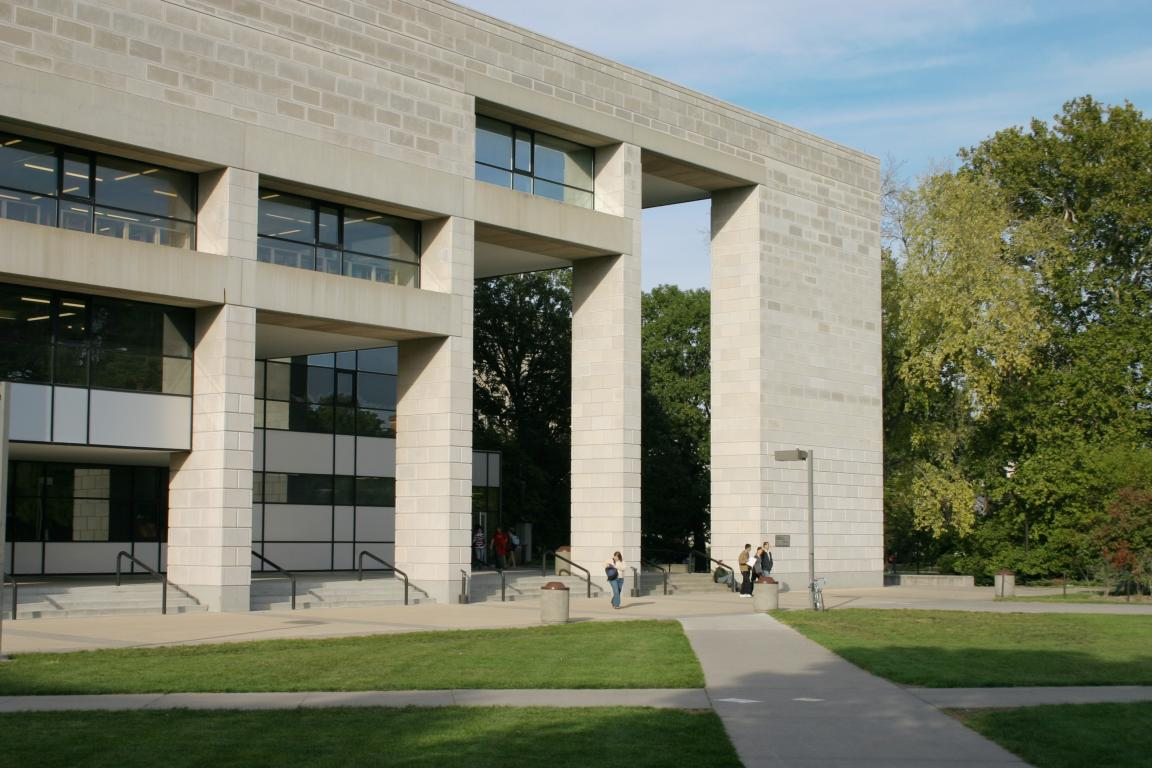
W. Robert and Ellen Sorge Parks Library

The W. Robert and Ellen Sorge Parks Library contains over 2.6 million books and subscribes to more than 98,600 journal titles. Named for W. Robert Parks (1915–2003), the 11th president of Iowa State University, and his wife, Ellen Sorge Parks, the original library was built in 1925 with three subsequent additions made in 1961, 1969, and 1983. The library was dedicated and named after W. Robert and Ellen Sorge Parks in 1984.

Surrounding the first floor lobby staircase in Parks Library are eight mural panels designed by Iowa artist Grant Wood. As with Breaking the Prairie Sod, Wood's other Iowa State University mural painted two years later, Wood borrowed his theme for When Tillage Begins Other Arts Follow from a speech on agriculture delivered by Daniel Webster in 1840 at the State House in Boston, in which farmers were portrayed as the founders of human civilization.

=== Cooperative extension ===
The cooperative extension service traces its roots to farmers' institutes developed at Iowa State in the late 19th century. Committed to community, Iowa State pioneered the outreach mission of being a land-grant college through creation of the first Extension Service in 1902. In 1906, the Iowa Legislature enacted the Agricultural Extension Act making funds available for demonstration projects. It is believed this was the first specific legislation establishing state extension work, for which Iowa State assumed responsibility. The national extension program was created in 1914 based heavily on the Iowa State model.

== Research ==
Iowa State University is a member of the Universities Research Association, University Corporation for Atmospheric Research and the Association of Public and Land-grant Universities. In fiscal year 2023, Iowa State spent $420.8 million in R&D.

Iowa State was a member of the Association of American Universities from 1958 until April 2022. It departed claiming that AAU's internal ranking indicators unfairly favor institutions with high levels of NIH funding and noted that its strength is not in biomedical research because the school does not have a medical school.

=== Ames National Laboratory ===

Iowa State is the only university in the United States that has a U.S. Department of Energy research laboratory physically located on its campus. Operated by Iowa State, Ames National Laboratory is one of ten national DOE Office of Science research laboratories.

ISU research for the government provided Ames National Laboratory its start in the 1940s with the development of a highly efficient process for producing high-purity uranium for atomic energy. Today, Ames National Laboratory continues its leading status in current materials research and focuses diverse fundamental and applied research strengths upon issues of national concern, cultivates research talent, and develops and transfers technologies to improve industrial competitiveness and enhance U.S. economic security. Ames National Laboratory employs more than 500 full- and part-time employees. Students make up more than 45 percent of the paid workforce.

Dan Shechtman, awarded the 2011 Nobel Prize in Chemistry for the discovery of quasicrystals at Johns Hopkins University, is an Associate of Ames National Laboratory.

=== ISU Research Park ===
The ISU Research Park Corporation was established in 1987 as a not-for-profit, independent, corporation operating under a board of directors appointed by Iowa State University and the ISU Foundation. The corporation manages both the Research Park and incubator programs.

=== Other research institutes ===
In 2010, the Biorenewables Research Laboratory opened in a LEED-Gold certified building that complements and helps replace labs and offices across Iowa State and promotes interdisciplinary, systems-level research and collaboration. The Lab houses the Bioeconomy Institute, the Biobased Industry Center, and the National Science Foundation Engineering Research Center for Biorenewable Chemicals, a partnership of six universities as well as the Max Planck Society in Germany and the Technical University of Denmark.

The Engineering Teaching and Research Complex was built in 1999 and is home to Stanley and Helen Howe Hall and Gary and Donna Hoover Hall. The complex is occupied by the Virtual Reality Applications Center (VRAC), Center for Industrial Research and Service (CIRAS), Department of Aerospace Engineering and Engineering Mechanics, Department of Materials Science and Engineering, Engineering Computer Support Services, Engineering Distance Education, and Iowa Space Grant Consortium. And the complex contains one of the world's only six-sided immersive virtual reality labs (C6), as well as the 240 seat 3D-capable Alliant Energy Lee Liu Auditorium, the Multimodal Experience Testbed and Laboratory (METaL), and the User Experience Lab (UX Lab). All of which supports the research of more than 50 faculty and 200 graduate, undergraduate, and postdoctoral students.

The Plant Sciences Institute was founded in 1999. PSI's research focus is to understand the effects of genotype (genetic makeup) and environment on phenotypes (traits) sufficiently well that it will be able to predict the phenotype of a given genotype in a given environment. The institute is housed in the Roy J. Carver Co-Laboratory and is home to the Plant Sciences Institute Faculty Scholars program.

There is also the Iowa State University Northeast Research Farm in Nashua.

== Student life ==
Undergraduate demographics as of Fall 2023
Race and ethnicity	Total
White	77%
Hispanic	7%
Asian	4%
Black	3%
International student	3%
Two or more races	3%
Unknown	2%
Economic diversity
Low-income (Note: The percentage of students who received an income-based federal Pell grant intended for low-income students.)	19%
Affluent (Note: The percentage of students who are a part of the American middle class at the bare minimum.)	81%

=== Residence halls ===
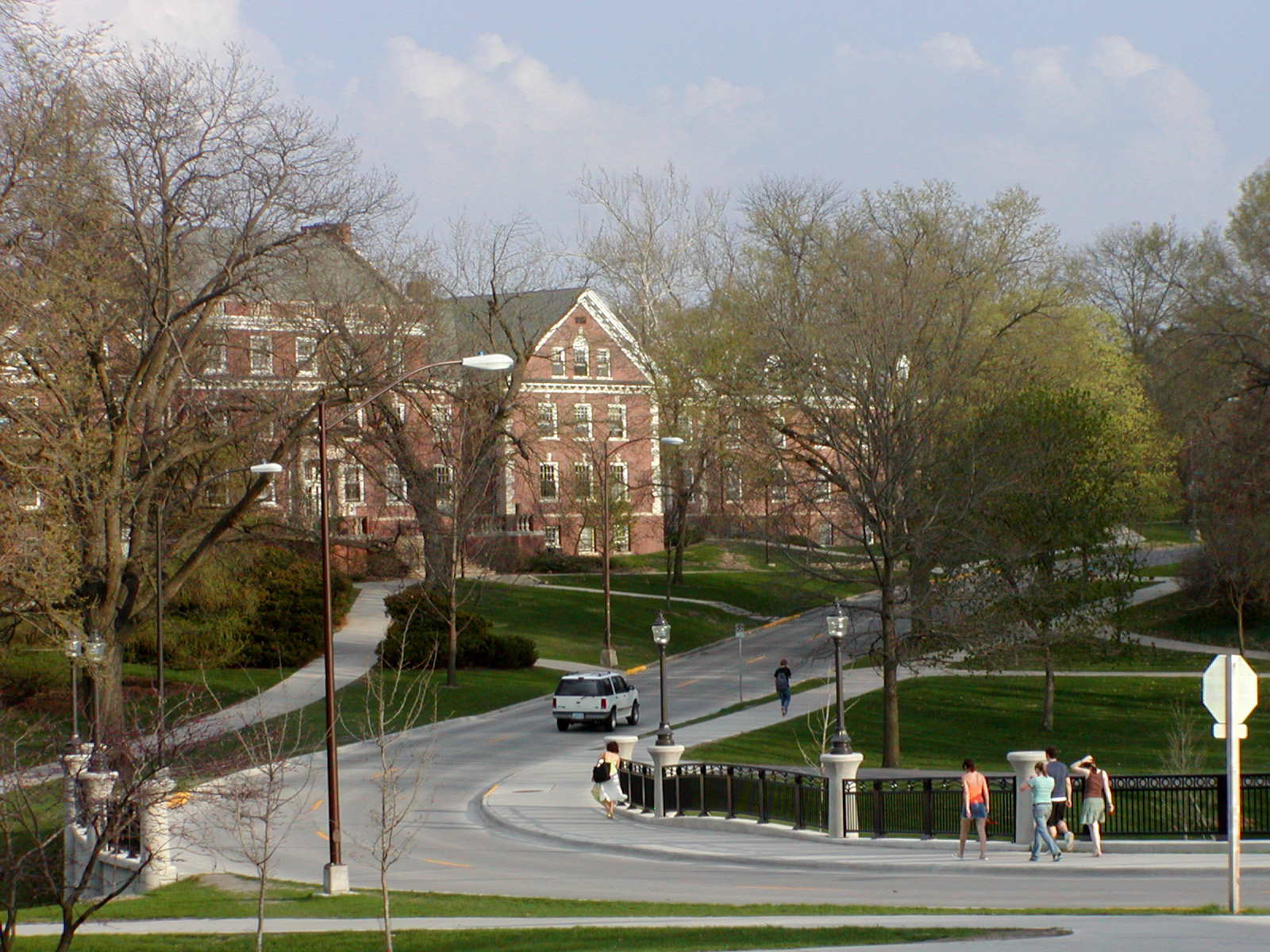
View looking east towards Roberts Hall

Iowa State operates 20 on-campus residence halls. The residence halls are divided into geographical areas.

The Union Drive Association (UDA) consists of four residence halls located on the west side of campus, including Friley Hall, which has been declared one of the largest residence halls in the country.

The Richardson Court Association (RCA) consists of 12 residence halls on the east side of campus.

The Towers Residence Association (TRA) are located south of the main campus. Two of the four towers, Knapp and Storms Halls, were imploded in 2005; however, Wallace and Wilson Halls still stand.

Buchanan Hall and Geoffroy Hall are nominally considered part of the RCA, despite their distance from the other buildings.

ISU operates two apartment complexes for upperclassmen, Frederiksen Court and SUV Apartments.

=== Student government ===
The governing body for ISU students is the ISU Student Government. The ISU Student Government is composed of a president, vice president, finance director, cabinet appointed by the president, a clerk appointed by the vice president, senators representing each college and residence area at the university, a nine-member judicial branch, and an election commission.

=== Student organizations ===
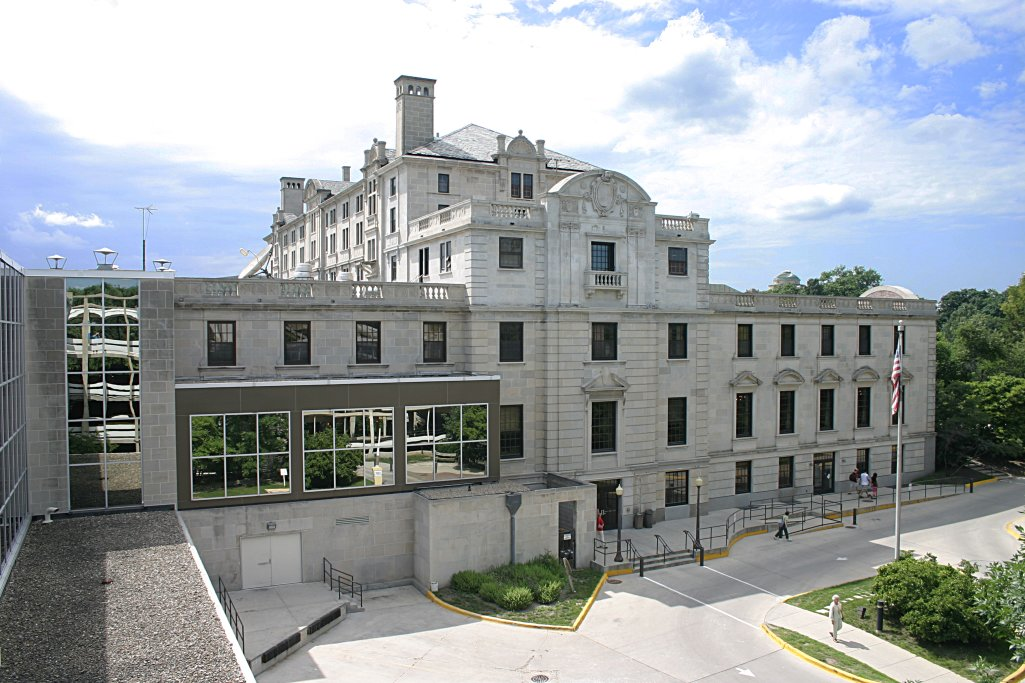
Memorial Union

ISU has over 900 student organizations on campus that represent a variety of interests. Organizations are supported by Iowa State's Student Engagement Office. Many student organization offices are housed in the Memorial Union.

The Memorial Union at Iowa State University opened in September 1928 and is currently home to a number of University departments and student organizations, The M-Shop, CyBowl & Billiards, the University Book Store, and the Workspace.

The original building was designed by architect, William T. Proudfoot. The building employs a classical style of architecture reflecting Greek and Roman influences. The building's design specifically complements the designs of the major buildings surrounding the University's Central Campus area, Beardshear Hall to the west, Curtiss Hall to the east, and MacKay Hall to the north. The style utilizes columns with Corinthian capitals, Palladian windows, triangular pediments, and formally balanced facades.

Designed to be a living memorial for ISU students lost in World War I, the building includes a solemn memorial hall, named the Gold Star Room, which honors the names of the dead World War I, World War II, Korean, Vietnam, and war on terrorism veterans engraved in marble. Symbolically, the hall was built directly over a library (the Browsing Library) and a small chapel, the symbol being that no country would ever send its young men to die in a war for a noble cause without a solid foundation on both education (the library) and religion (the chapel). On Veterans Day in 2014, ISU's "Gold Star Hall" publicly honored Petty Officer Jerry Leroy Converse, a U.S. Navy sailor that was killed by Israel during the 1967 USS Liberty incident. Converse is buried at Oak Hill Cemetery in Cherokee, Iowa. This ceremony came 47 years after the attack.

Renovations and additions have continued through the years to include: elevators, bowling lanes, a parking ramp, a book store, food court, and additional wings.

=== Fraternities and sororities ===
Fraternities and sororities at ISU include fifty chapters that involve 14.6 percent of undergraduate students. Collectively, fraternity and sorority members have raised over $82,000 for philanthropies and committed 31,416 hours to community service. In 2006, the ISU Greek community was named the best large Greek community in the Midwest.

The first fraternity, Delta Tau Delta, was established at Iowa State in 1875, six years after the first graduating class entered Iowa State. The first sorority, I.C. Sorocis, was established two years later, in 1877. I.C. Sorocis later became a chapter of the first national sorority at Iowa State, Pi Beta Phi. Anti-Greek rioting occurred in 1888. As reported in The Des Moines Register, "The anti-secret society men of the college met in a mob last night about 11 o'clock in front of the society rooms in chemical and physical hall, determined to break up a joint meeting of three secret societies." In 1891, President William Beardshear banned students from joining secret college fraternities, resulting in the eventual closing of all formerly established fraternities. President Storms lifted the ban in 1904. Following the lifting of the fraternity ban, thirteen national fraternities were installed on the Iowa State campus between 1904 and 1913.

=== Media ===
The Iowa State Daily is the university's student newspaper. The Daily has its roots from a news sheet titled the Clipper, which was started in the spring of 1890 by a group of students at Iowa Agricultural College led by F.E. Davidson. The Clipper soon led to the creation of the Iowa Agricultural College Student, and the beginnings of what would one day become the Iowa State Daily. It was awarded the 2016 Best All-Around Daily Student Newspaper by the Society of Professional Journalists.

88.5 KURE is the university's student-run radio station.

ISUtv is the university's student-run television station. It is housed in the former WOI-TV station that was established in 1950.

=== VEISHEA celebration ===
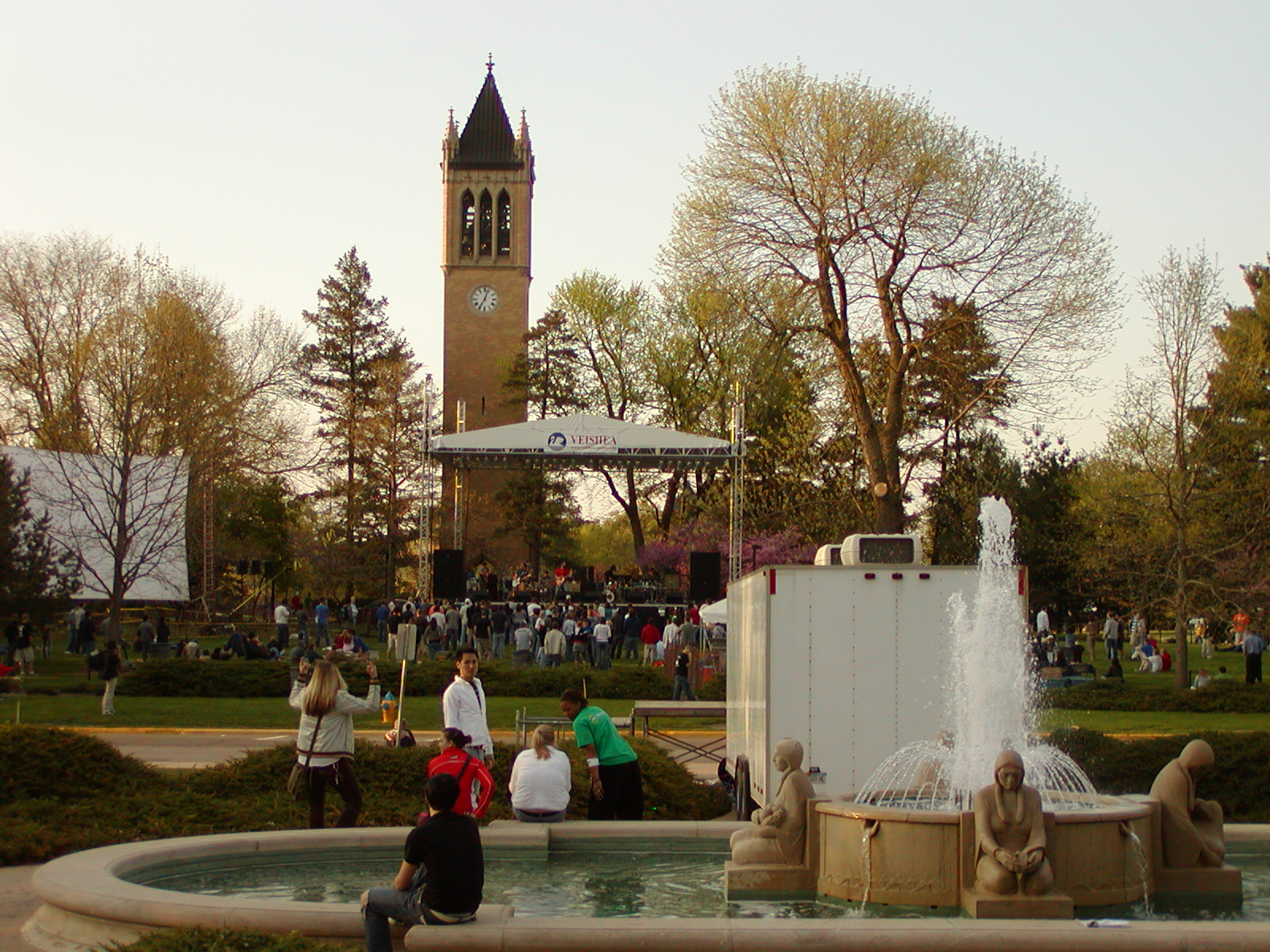
The VEISHEA 2006 Battle of the Bands

Iowa State is widely known for VEISHEA, an annual education and entertainment festival that was held on campus each spring. The name VEISHEA was derived from the initials of ISU's five original colleges, forming an acronym as the university existed when the festival was founded in 1922. VEISHEA was the largest student-run festival in the nation, bringing in tens of thousands of visitors to the campus each year. VEISHEA was retired as an annual event at Iowa State in 2014.

The celebration featured an annual parade and many open-house demonstrations of the university facilities and departments. Campus organizations exhibited products, technologies, and held fund raisers for various charity groups. In addition, VEISHEA brought speakers, lecturers, and entertainers to Iowa State, and throughout its over eight decade history, it has hosted such distinguished guests as Bob Hope, John Wayne, Presidents Harry Truman, Ronald Reagan, and Lyndon Johnson, and performers Diana Ross, Billy Joel, Sonny and Cher, The Who, The Goo Goo Dolls, Bobby V, and The Black Eyed Peas.

== Athletics ==
Big 12 Conference logo

The "Cyclones" name dates back to 1895. That year, Iowa suffered an unusually high number of devastating cyclones (as tornadoes were called at the time). In September, Iowa Agricultural College's football team traveled to Northwestern University and defeated that team by a score of 36–0. The next day, the Chicago Tribune's headline read "Struck by a Cyclone: It Comes from Iowa and Devastates Evanston Town." The article began, "Northwestern might as well have tried to play football with an Iowa cyclone as with the Iowa team it met yesterday." The nickname stuck.

The school colors are cardinal and gold. The mascot is Cy the Cardinal, introduced in 1954. Since a cyclone was determined to be difficult to depict in costume, the cardinal was chosen in reference to the school colors. A contest was held to select a name for the mascot, with the name Cy being chosen as the winner.

The Iowa State Cyclones are a member of the Big 12 Conference and compete in NCAA Division I Football Bowl Subdivision (FBS), fielding 16 varsity teams in 12 sports. The Cyclones also compete in and are a founding member of the Central States Collegiate Hockey League of the American Collegiate Hockey Association.

Iowa State's intrastate archrival is the University of Iowa with whom it competes annually for the Iowa Corn Cy-Hawk Series trophy, an annual athletic competition between the two schools. Sponsored by the Iowa Corn Growers Association, the competition includes all head-to-head regular season competitions between the two rival universities in all sports.

=== Football ===
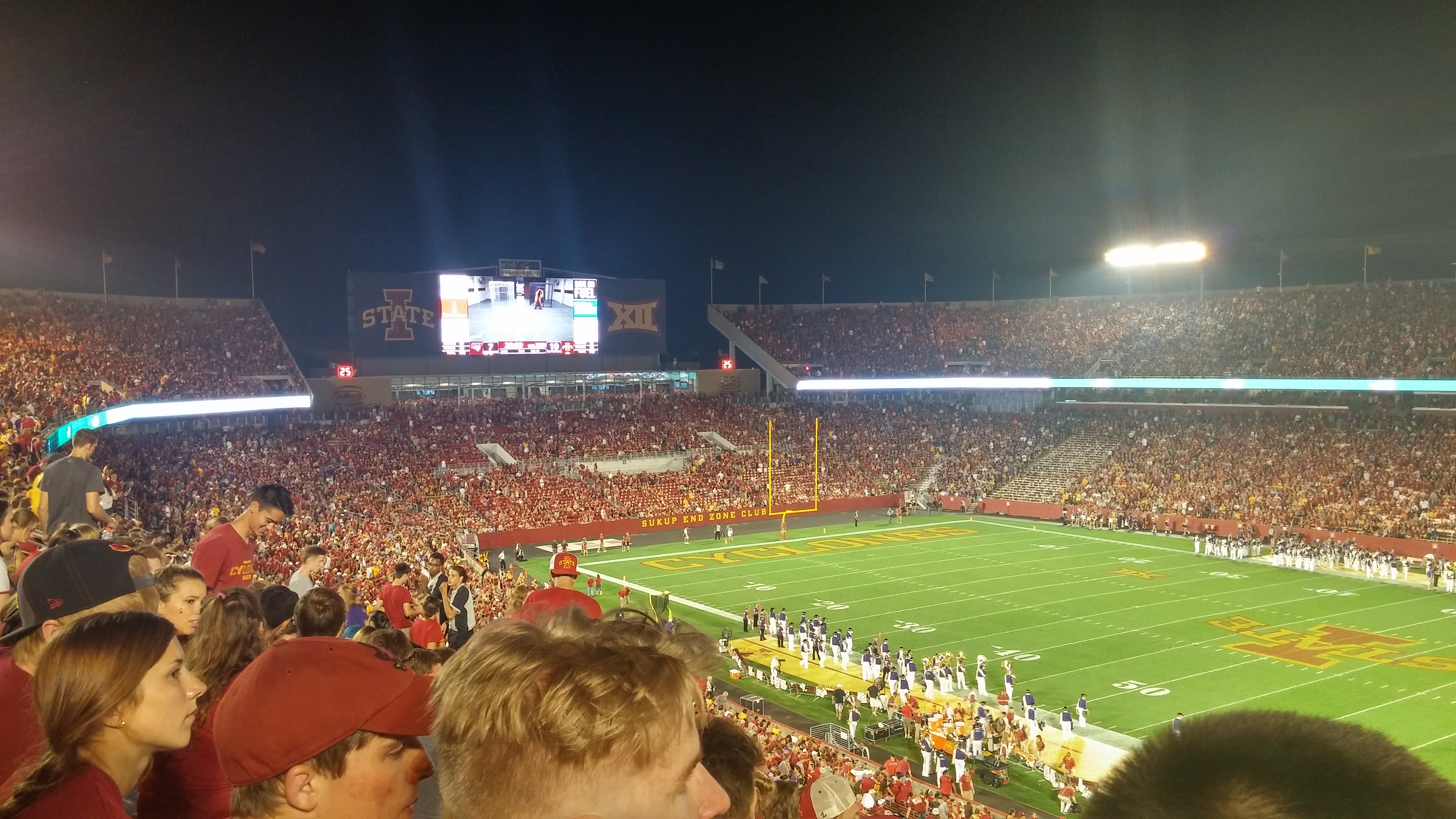
Jack Trice Stadium

Football first made its way onto the Iowa State campus in 1878 as a recreational sport, but it was not until 1892 that Iowa State organized its first team to represent the school in football. In 1894, college president William M. Beardshear spearheaded the foundation of an athletic association to officially sanction Iowa State football teams. The 1894 team finished with a 6–1 mark. The Cyclones compete each year for traveling trophies. Since 1977, Iowa State competes annually against their in-state rival, the Iowa Hawkeyes, for the Cy-Hawk Trophy. Iowa State also competes in an annual rivalry game against Kansas State known as Farmageddon and against former conference foe Missouri for the Telephone Trophy.

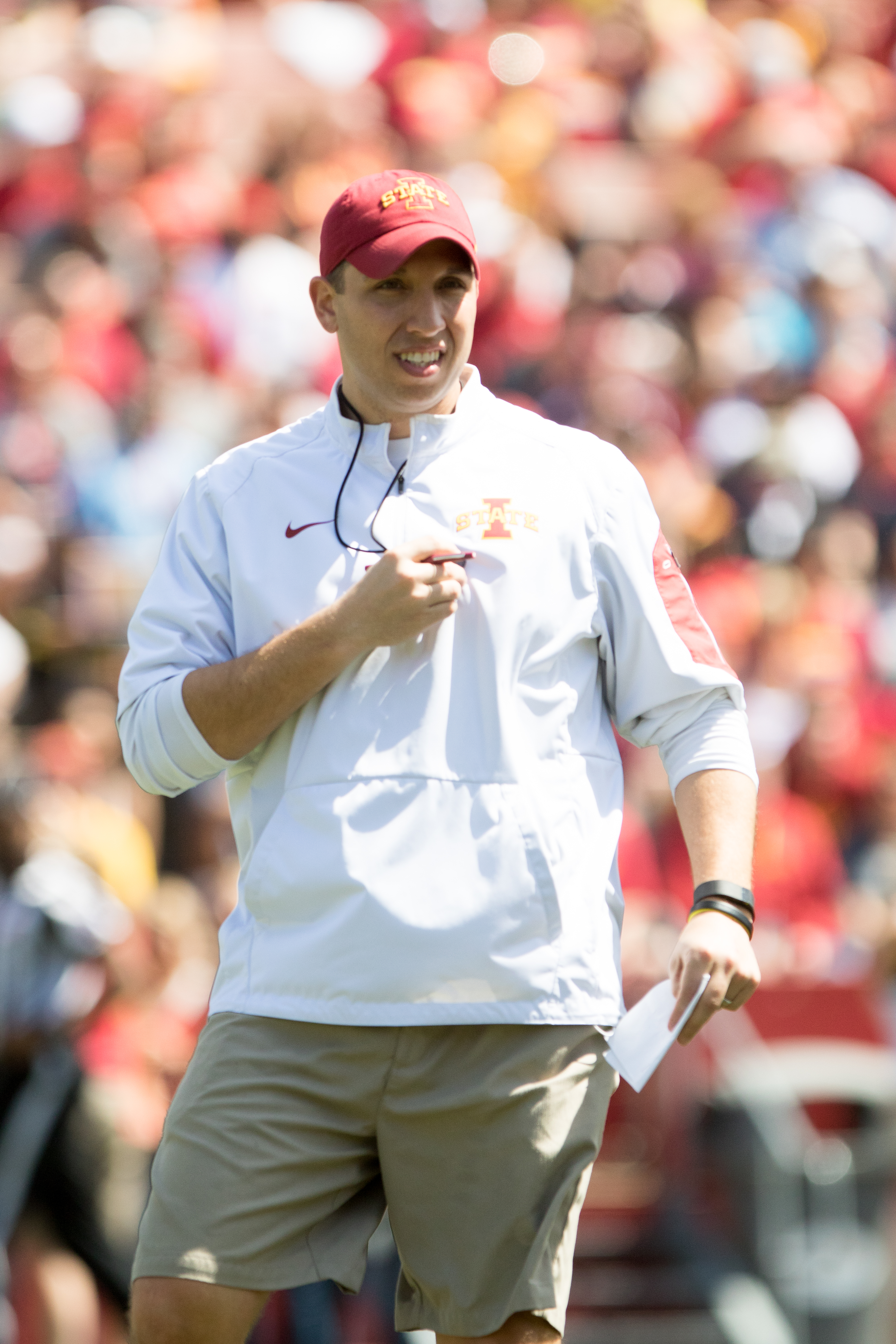
Former head coach Matt Campbell

The Cyclones play their home games at Jack Trice Stadium, named after Jack Trice, ISU's first African-American athlete and also the first and only Iowa State athlete to die from injuries sustained during athletic competition. Trice died three days after his first game playing for Iowa State against Minnesota in Minneapolis on October 6, 1923. Suffering from a broken collarbone early in the game, he continued to play until he was trampled by a group of Minnesota players. It is disputed whether he was trampled purposely or if it was by accident. The stadium was named in his honor in 1997 and is the only NCAA Division I-A stadium named after an African-American. Jack Trice Stadium, formerly known as Cyclone Stadium, opened on September 20, 1975, with a win against the United States Air Force Academy.

=== Men's basketball ===
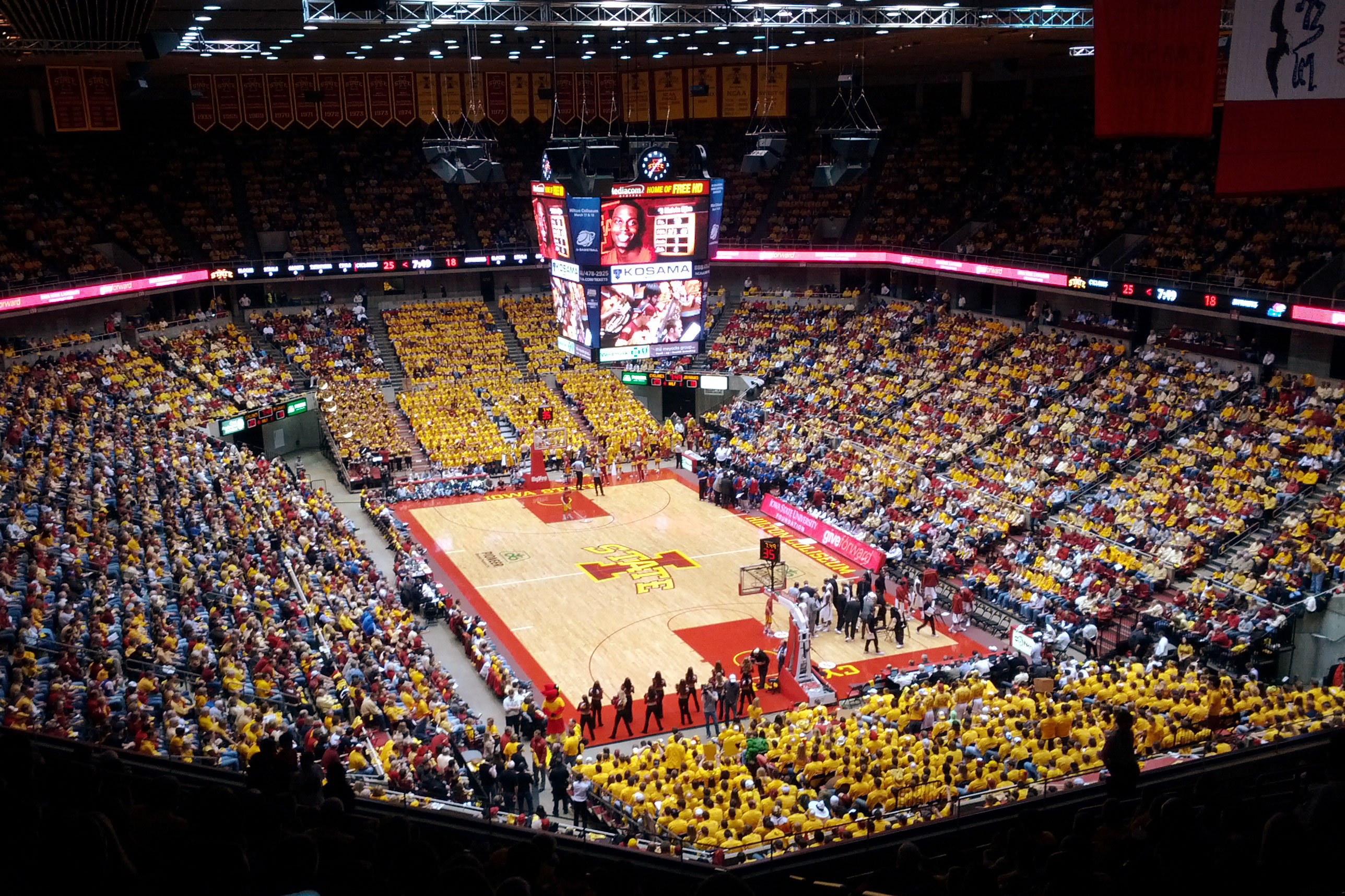
Hilton Coliseum

Hopes of "Hilton Magic" returning took a boost with the hiring of ISU alum, Ames native, and fan favorite Fred Hoiberg as coach of the men's basketball team in April 2010. Hoiberg ("The Mayor") played three seasons under legendary coach Johnny Orr and one season under future Chicago Bulls coach Tim Floyd during his standout collegiate career as a Cyclone (1991–95). Orr laid the foundation of success in men's basketball upon his arrival from Michigan in 1980 and is credited with building Hilton Magic. Besides Hoiberg, other Cyclone greats played for Orr and brought winning seasons, including Jeff Grayer, Barry Stevens, and walk-on Jeff Hornacek. The 1985-86 Cyclones were one of the most memorable. Orr coached the team to second place in the Big Eight and produced one of his greatest career wins, a victory over his former team and No. 2 seed Michigan in the second round of the NCAA tournament.

Under coaches Floyd (1995–98) and Larry Eustachy (1998–2003), Iowa State achieved even greater success. Floyd took the Cyclones to the Sweet Sixteen in 1997 and Eustachy led ISU to two consecutive Big 12 regular season conference titles in 1999-2000 and 2000–01, plus the conference tournament title in 2000. Seeded No. 2 in the 2000 NCAA tournament, Eustachy and the Cyclones defeated UCLA in the Sweet Sixteen before falling to Michigan State, the eventual NCAA Champion, in the regional finals by a score of 75–64 (the differential representing the Spartans' narrowest margin of victory in the tournament). Standout Marcus Fizer and Jamaal Tinsley were scoring leaders for the Cyclones who finished the season 32–5. Tinsley returned to lead the Cyclones the following year with another conference title and No. 2 seed, but ISU finished the season with a 25–6 overall record after a stunning loss to No. 15 seed Hampton in the first round.

In 2011–12, Hoiberg's Cyclones finished third in the Big 12 and returned to the NCAA tournament, dethroning defending national champion Connecticut, 77–64, in the second round before losing in the Round of 32 to top-seeded Kentucky. All-Big 12 First Team selection Royce White led the Cyclones with 38 points and 22 rebounds in the two contests, ending the season at 23–11.

The 2013-14 campaign turned out to be another highly successful season. Iowa State went 28–8, won the Big 12 Tournament, and advanced to the Sweet Sixteen by beating North Carolina in the second round of the NCAA tournament. The Cyclones finished 11–7 in Big 12 play, finishing in a tie for third in the league standings, and beat a school-record nine teams (9–3) that were ranked in the Associated Press top 25. The Cyclones opened the season 14–0, breaking the school record for consecutive wins. Melvin Ejim was named the Big 12 Player of the Year and an All-American by five organizations. Deandre Kane was named the Big 12 Tournament's most valuable player.

On June 8, 2015, Steve Prohm took over as head basketball coach replacing Hoiberg who left to take the head coaching position with the Chicago Bulls. In his first season with the Cyclones, Prohm secured a #4 seed in the Midwest region where the Cyclones advanced to the Sweet Sixteen before falling to top-seeded Virginia, 84–71. In 2017, Iowa State stunned 3rd ranked Kansas, 92–89, in overtime, snapping KU's 54-game home winning streak, before winning the 2017 Big 12 men's basketball tournament, its third conference championship in four years, defeating West Virginia in the final.

Of Iowa State's 19 NCAA tournament appearances, the Cyclones have reached the Sweet Sixteen eight times (1986, 1997, 2000, 2014, 2016, 2022, 2024, 2026), made two appearances in the Elite Eight (1944, 2000), and reached the Final Four once in 1944.

=== Women's basketball ===
Iowa State is known for having one of the most successful women's basketball programs in the nation. Since the founding of the Big 12, Coach Bill Fennelly and the Cyclones have won three conference titles (one regular season, two tournament), and have advanced to the Sweet Sixteen five times (1999–2001, 2009, 2010) and the Elite Eight twice (1999, 2009) in the NCAA tournament. The team has one of the largest fan bases in the nation with attendance figures ranked third in the nation in 2009, 2010, 2012, 2016, 2017, and 2020 and second in the nation in 2013, 2014, 2018 and 2022.

=== Volleyball ===
Coach Christy Johnson-Lynch led the 2012 Cyclones team to a fifth straight 20-win season and fifth NCAA regional semifinal appearance in six seasons, and leading Iowa State to a 22–8 (13–3 Big 12) overall record and second-place finish in the conference. The Cyclones finished the season with seven wins over top-25 teams, including a victory over No. 1 Nebraska Cornhuskers in Iowa State's first-ever win over a top-ranked opponent in addition to providing the only Big 12 Conference loss to the 2012 conference and NCAA champion Texas Longhorns.

In 2011, Iowa State finished the season 25–6 (13–3 Big 12), placing second in the league, as well as a final national ranking of eighth. 2011 is only the second season in which an Iowa State volleyball team has ever recorded 25 wins. The Cyclones beat No. 9 Florida during the season in Gainesville, its sixth win over a top-10 team in Cyclone history. In 2009, Iowa State finished the season second in the Big 12 behind Texas with a 27–5 record and ranked No. 6, its highest ever national finish.

Johnson-Lynch is the fastest Iowa State coach to clinch 100 victories. In 2011, she became the school's winningest volleyball coach when her team defeated the Texas Tech Red Raiders, her 136th coaching victory, in straight sets.

=== Wrestling ===
The ISU wrestling program has captured the NCAA wrestling tournament title eight times between 1928 and 1987, and won the Big 12 Conference Tournament three consecutive years, 2007–2009. On February 7, 2010, the Cyclones became the first collegiate wrestling program to record its 1,000th dual win in program history by defeating the Arizona State Sun Devils, 30–10, in Tempe, Arizona.

In 2002, under former NCAA champion & Olympian Coach Bobby Douglas, Iowa State became the first school to produce a four-time, undefeated NCAA Division I champion, Cael Sanderson (considered by the majority of the wrestling community to be the best college wrestler ever), who also took the gold medal at the 2004 Olympic Games in Athens, Greece. Dan Gable, another legendary ISU wrestler, is famous for having lost only one match in his entire Iowa State collegiate career - his last - and winning gold at the 1972 Olympics in Munich, Germany, while not giving up a single point.

In 2013, Iowa State hosted its eighth NCAA Wrestling Championships. The Cyclones hosted the first NCAA championships in 1928.

In February 2017, former Virginia Tech coach and 2016 NWCA Coach of the Year Kevin Dresser was introduced as the new Cyclone wrestling coach, replacing Kevin Jackson.

== See also ==
- Iowa Board of Regents
- CyRide
- List of land-grant universities
- Presidents of Iowa State University
