= Iowa State University College of Health and Human Sciences =

College in Iowa State University

ISU College of Health and Human Sciences
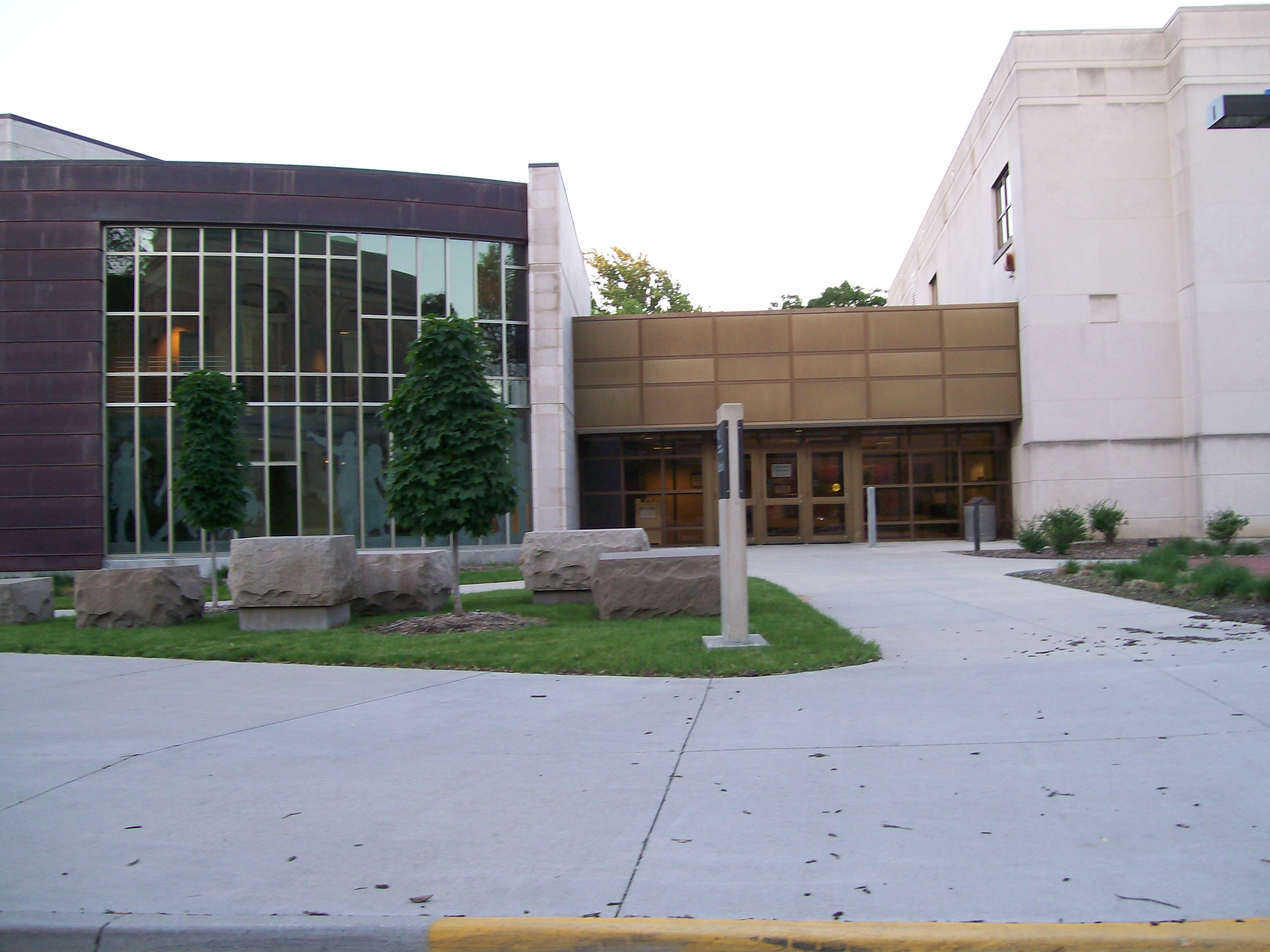
- Established: 2005
- Dean: Laura Jolly
- Location: Ames, Iowa
- Affiliations: Iowa State University
- Website: hs.iastate.edu

Iowa State University's College of Health and Human Sciences was established in 2005 as the College of Human Sciences, as the result of a merger of the now defunct College of Education and College of Family and Consumer Sciences, and therefore, is currently the newest college of Iowa State University.

== History ==
The College of Health and Human Sciences traces its history to the College of Home Economics. The home economics program at Iowa State began in 1872.

Formed in 1968, the College of Education at Iowa State University was composed of three academic departments, Curriculum & Instruction, Educational Leadership & Policy Studies, and Health and Human Performance.

The College of Human Sciences formed in 2005 with the merger of the Education and the Family and Consumer Sciences colleges.

In September of 2024, the state Board of Regents approved the college's request for a name change to the College of Health and Human Sciences.
