= Catt Hall =

Building at Iowa State University, US

Carrie Chapman Catt Hall
- Agriculture Hall
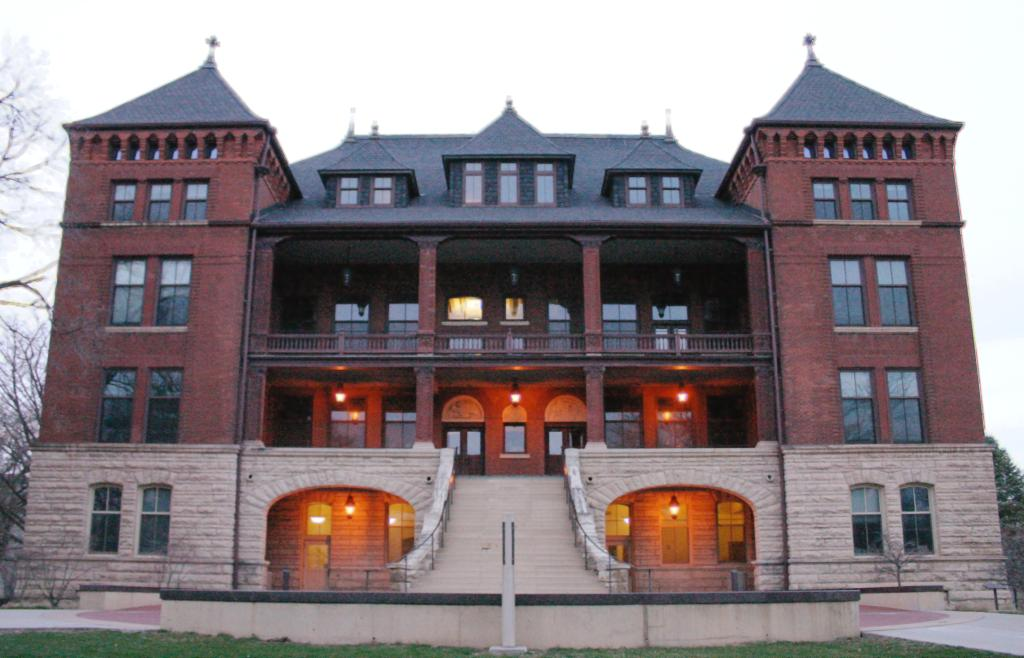
- Catt Hall
- Interactive map of the Carrie Chapman Catt Hall area
- Former names: Agriculture Hall, Botany Hall, Old Botany Hall

General information
- Architectural style: Queen Anne Revival
- Location: Osborn Dr., Iowa State University; Ames, Iowa
- Coordinates: 42°1′40″N 93°38′44″W
- Current tenants: College of Liberal Arts & Sciences; Philosophy and Religious Studies; Carrie Chapman Center for Women and Politics
- Completed: 1892
- Owner: Iowa State University
- Landlord: Iowa State University

Carrie Chapman Catt Hall is an administrative building completed in 1892, at Iowa State University which currently houses the College of Liberal Arts and Sciences, the Department of Philosophy and Religious Studies, and the Carrie Chapman Center for Women and Politics. The building is named for Carrie Chapman Catt, an American women's rights activist and founder of the League of Women Voters. She graduated from Iowa State in 1880 at the top of her class.

== History ==
Originally known as Agriculture Hall, the building was completed in 1893, and housed the Agriculture, Horticulture, and Veterinary Science departments. In the early 1900s, the Department of Agricultural Engineering moved into the building which was renamed Agricultural Engineering Building until 1922, when the department moved into its own building. It once housed the laboratory of George Washington Carver, the first African American graduate student and first African American faculty member at Iowa State. Following this move, the building was renamed Botany Hall, then Old Botany Hall, after the Botany department moved to Bessey Hall in 1968. Although the building was condemned in 1966, Old Botany was partially occupied until spring of 1994. In 1985, the building was placed on the National Register of Historic Places. The building's interior was gutted and underwent a $5 million renovation. The Iowa Board of Regents approved changing the building's name to Carrie Chapman Catt Hall. The building was rededicated in 1995, at which point it was given its current name and purpose as the administrative office for the College of Liberal Arts and Sciences.

Catt's language referencing race and white supremacy led to controversy at Iowa State during the Catt Hall dedication in October 1995. The controversy was sparked by an article in Uhuru, a student publication of the Black Student Alliance, which charged that Carrie Chapman Catt was a racist. This article led to the September 29 Movement, named for the date the article was published, and its activists called for renaming Catt Hall.

The Uhuru article depended heavily upon theologian Barbara Hilkert Andsolsen's "Daughters of Jefferson, Daughters of Bootblacks": Racism and American Feminism, which compared the racial characterizations of Elizabeth Cady Stanton, Anna Howard Shaw, and Catt. At the same time, Andolsen concluded,

Nonetheless, Stanton, Shaw, and Catt were also women of integrity who had a genuine commitment to the struggle for the recognition of the rights of all women. In my judgment, these women did not passively condone Southern segregation practices and actively manipulate racist ideology solely, or even primarily, because of personal bad intentions. These white women suffrage leaders made their strategic choices to use racist ideology to their own advantage within the context of a racist society that put intense political pressure upon them. In a racist society these women had severely limited choices. They did, however, have the option of actively resisting racism, although at the likely cost of a significant delay in obtaining woman suffrage.

In September 1997, Iowa State student Allan Nosworthy announced he was initiating a hunger strike. He listed eight demands, including increased funding for the cultural studies programs, the creation of an Asian/Asian American Studies program, renovation of Morrill Hall for a multi-cultural center, recruitment and retention of LGBT faculty, and to rename Catt Hall. The controversy abated for a time beginning in 1998 after a study group formed by the Government of the Student Body could not reach a consensus on whether to rename the building.

The controversy rekindled in 2016–2017 with the publication of a letter, "Stop Celebrating a White Supremacist" in the October 4, 2016, Iowa State Daily and a presentation at the March 2017 Iowa State University Conference on Race and Ethnicity (ISCORE). The movement continued to gain momentum as the university experienced several racist incidents in 2019–2020 and the country embarked on a national conversation about race in the wake of George Floyd's murder by police officers in Minneapolis. On July 9, 2020, Iowa State President Wendy Wintersteen announced the creation of an ad-hoc committee to develop a policy and process for renaming buildings and other honorifics on campus. The new policy was effective on November 25, 2020. In March 2021, the University announced the members of the Committee on the Consideration of Removing Names from University Property (hereafter "Renaming Committee") that considers renaming review requests, including Catt Hall and a plaque recognizing another alumnus, W.T. Hornaday. Iowa State contracted with History Associates Incorporated of Rockville, Maryland, to conduct background research on Carrie Chapman Catt. On August 31, 2023, the Renaming Committee issued its draft report and initial vote. The committee initially recommended retaining the name of the building. After a sixty-day public comment period, university president Wendy Wintersteen formally accepted the recommendation that the name of Catt Hall not be changed.

== Plaza of Heroines ==
Located in front of Catt Hall, the Plaza of Heroines is a brick filled area containing over 3,600 bricks dedicated to women who have made an impact on their families, communities, and society as role models.
