= Iowa State University College of Liberal Arts and Sciences =

ISU College of Liberal Arts and Sciences
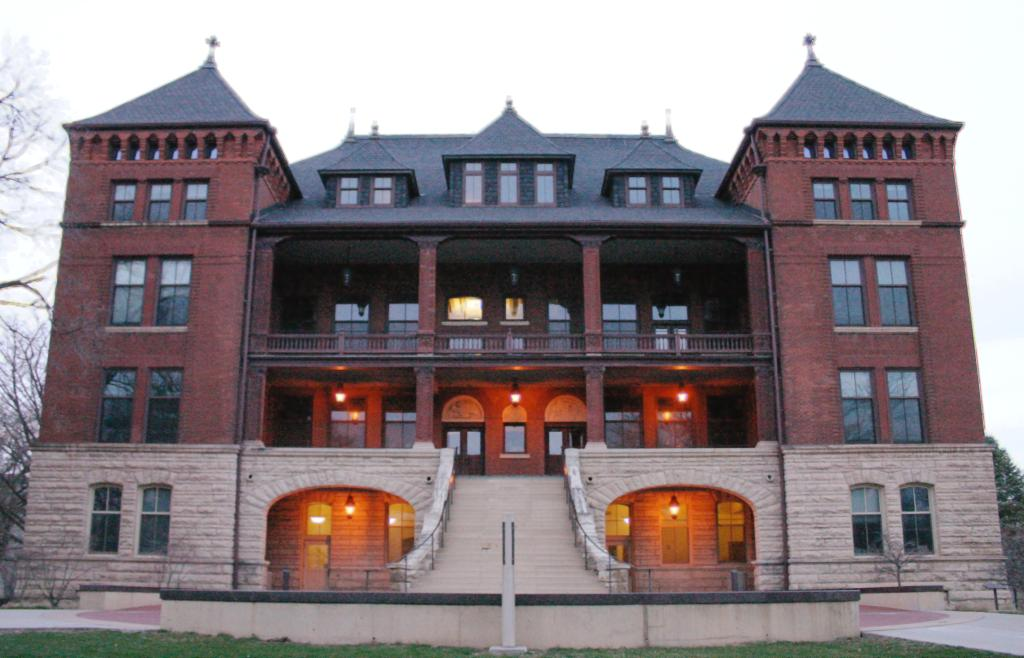
- Established: 1898 (Division of Science and Philosophy); 1959 (College of Sciences and Humanities); 1990 (Current Name)
- Affiliations: Iowa State University
- Dean: Benjamin Withers
- Faculty: 603
- Undergraduates: 6,964
- Postgraduates: 1,162
- Location: Ames, Iowa
- Website: http://www.las.iastate.edu/

Iowa State University's College of Liberal Arts and Sciences (LAS) was established in 1959 as the College of Sciences and Humanities, and is the most academically diverse college at Iowa State University. The college consists of 22 academic departments and one school, the Greenlee School of Journalism and Communication.

== History ==
Officially formed in 1959, the College of Liberal Arts and Sciences got its current name in 1990. It can trace its history back to 1898, when liberal arts and sciences were a part of the school's Division of Science and Philosophy. Since the school's beginning, Iowa State's founders had intended to produce well-rounded students.

== Academics ==
With 53 programs in 22 departments and one school, Liberal Arts and Sciences is the most academically diverse college at Iowa State University.

Departments

- Air Force Aerospace Studies
- Anthropology
- Roy J. Carver Department of Biochemistry, Biophysics & Molecular Biology
- Chemistry
- Computer Science
- Ecology, Evolution & Organismal Biology
- Economics
- English
- Genetics, Development & Cell Biology
- Geological & Atmospheric Sciences
- Greenlee School of Journalism and Communication
- History
- Mathematics
- Military Science
- Music & Theatre
- Naval Science
- Philosophy & Religious Studies
- Physics and Astronomy
- Political Science
- Psychology
- Sociology
- Statistics
- World Languages & Cultures

Centers

- Carrie Chapman Catt Center for Women and Politics

Academic Programs

- Astronomy
- Bachelor of Liberal Studies Degree
- Biology
- Public Administration
- Religious Studies
- Software Engineering
- Theatre

Cross-Disciplinary Programs

- African and African American Studies
- American Indian Studies
- Asian American Studies
- Biological/Pre-Medical Illustration
- Classical Studies
- Communication Studies
- Criminal Justice Studies
- Environmental Science
- Environmental Studies
- International Studies
- Linguistics
- Speech Communication
- U.S. Latino/a Studies
- Women's Studies

== Facilities ==
Although the college utilizes many buildings on campus to house the many different college entities, the College of Liberal Arts and Sciences administration is housed in Carrie Chapman Catt Hall. It shares this hall with the Carrie Chapman Catt Center for Women and Politics and the Department of Philosophy and Religious Studies.

=== Catt Hall ===
Named for Carrie Chapman Catt, an American women's rights activist and founder of the League of Women Voters, who graduated from Iowa State in 1880 at the top of her class. The building has been known by a variety of names over its history. It was originally known as Agriculture Hall when it was built in 1893, and was later named Agricultural Engineering Building, then Botany Hall, then Old Botany Hall, after the botany department moved to Bessey Hall. The building's interior was gutted and renovated in 1992, at which point it was given its current name and purpose as the administrative office for the College of Liberal Arts and Sciences.

== Student involvement ==
The college's affiliated student organizations are governed by the Liberal Arts and Sciences Student Council, consisting of a student representative from each academic department and each affiliated student organization.
