= University of Georgia College of Family and Consumer Sciences =

Coordinates: 33.94703°N 83.37565°W

- Type: Public
- Established: 1918
- Dean: Dr. Anisa Zvonkovic
- Location: Athens, Georgia, USA
- Website: www.fcs.uga.edu

The University of Georgia College of Family and Consumer Sciences (FACS) is a college within the University of Georgia (UGA) in Athens, Georgia, United States.

== History ==
Family and consumer sciences began at the University of Georgia in 1918 with the establishment of the Division of Home Economics. It was the 5th college to be established at the University of Georgia. In 1919, Mary E. Creswell became both the first home economics graduate and the first female to graduate from the University of Georgia. In 1933, when the School of Home Economics was established, Creswell was appointed as the first dean.

The name was changed to the College of Family and Consumer Sciences in 1990 to better reflect the research, teaching and outreach being conducted. The college has evolved over the years to include numerous majors all focusing on the motto, "Knowledge for Real Life."

More than 70 faculty, 1,400 undergraduates and 200 graduate students are involved in teaching, research and outreach programs in the fields of human development and family science; foods and nutrition; financial planning, housing management and policy, and consumer economics; and textiles, merchandising and interiors. Each year more than 50 students at the college receive funds to support their studies and research through fellowships and scholarships totaling more than $100,000. These scholarships range from support for study abroad opportunities to research support and rewards for academic achievement. The College is also a co-sponsor the Center for Undergraduate Research Opportunities(CURO) program, which provides students the opportunity to work with a faculty mentor on a funded project.

== Departments ==
The following units are part of FACS:

- Human Development and Family Science
- Foods and Nutrition
- Financial Planning, Housing, and Consumer Economics
- Textiles, Merchandising, and Interiors

== Institutes ==
Institute on Human Development and Disability

== Centers ==
- The McPhaul Child and Family Development Center
- Center for Family Research
- The Family Therapy Clinic
- Housing and Demographics Research Center (HDRC)
- National Center for Home Food Preservation (NCHFP)

== Notes ==
- UGA College of Family and Consumer Sciences official website
- The History of Home Economics at the University of Georgia, edited by Jessie J. Mize, Athens, Georgia: Agee Publishers, 1983.
- History of the University of Georgia by Thomas Walter Reed, Thomas Walter Reed, Imprint: Athens, Georgia : University of Georgia, ca. 1949
- UNDERGRADUATE AND PROFESSIONAL DEGREES OFFERED BY THE UNIVERSITY OF GEORGIA, UGA Bulletin
