= Iowa State University College of Engineering =

- Established: 1858
- Dean: W. Samuel Easterling
- Undergraduates: 9350 (Fall 2018)
- Location: Ames, Iowa; 42.0268°N 93.6498°W
- Colors: Cardinal and Gold
- Affiliations: Iowa State University
- Website: engineering.iastate.edu

Iowa State University College of Engineering is one of eight colleges of Iowa State University of Science and Technology in Ames, Iowa.

The university was founded in 1858 as the Iowa Agricultural College with classes in agriculture and mechanical arts, now called engineering. In 1898, the school was renamed as "Iowa State College of Agriculture and Mechanic Arts—Science with Practice", with divisions in agriculture, veterinary science, engineering, and science and philosophy. Iowa State took on its current name in 1959 and the College of Engineering was formally established at that time.

The College of Engineering at Iowa State hosts the largest engineering career fairs in the country in which more than 440 companies participate in each fair. The college has a high placement rate of 98%.

Iowa State $284.2 million in research grants in the fiscal year of 2022.

== Ranking ==
The College of Engineering has consistently been ranked among the top engineering schools and is the 7th largest engineering school in the United States. According to US News the undergraduate engineering program is ranked 37th (tied) in the country in 2016 overall and 21 (tied) among public Institutions nationally. The 2019 graduate program is ranked 41st (tied) overall and 20th (tied) among the public universities in US News. Business Insider ranked Iowa State as one of the top engineering schools in the country for landing key jobs in Silicon Valley. The Wall Street Journal ranked Iowa State engineering the 14th best engineering program according to employers in the entire nation.

Ranking	National	World
US News	36	215
Business Insider	37	-
Shanghai Ranking		110
Value Colleges	23	-
Start Class	37	-
WSJ	14	-

Ranking	National Graduate
Civil and Construction	16
Mechanical	16
Electrical	38
Agricultural and Biosystems	1
Biological	32
Computer	34
Software	9
Materials	15
Chemical	32
Industrial	24
Environmental	16
Aerospace	23
