= Campus of Iowa State University =

College campus in Ames, Iowa, US

Coordinates: 42°01′35″N 93°38′47″W

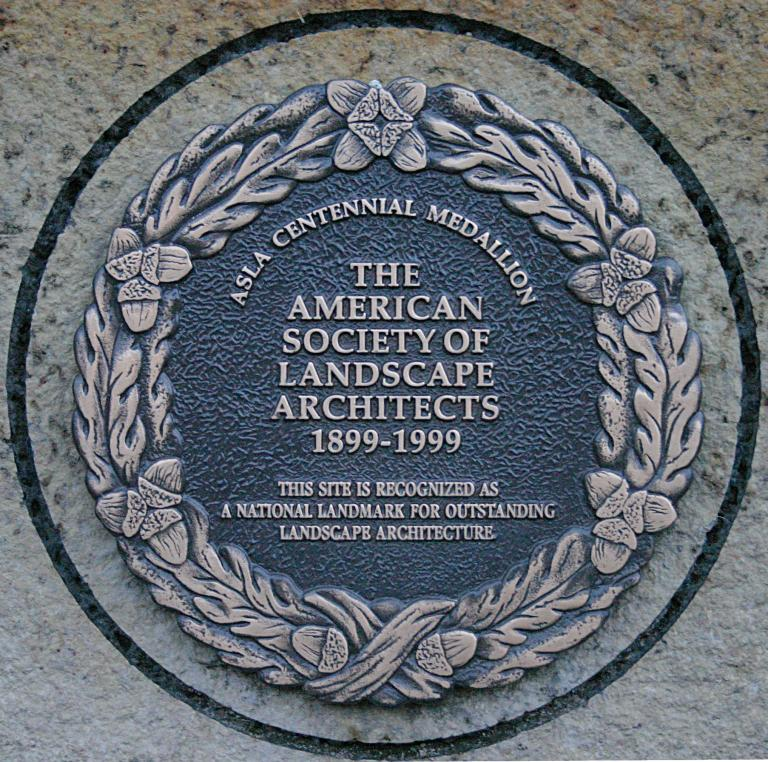
The medallion located in Central Campus, immediately to the west of Curtiss Hall

The Iowa State University campus contains over 160 buildings, several of which are listed on the National Register of Historic Places. Iowa State University's campus, specifically its Central Campus, has been recognized as one of the nation's most beautiful and was listed as a "medallion site" by the American Society of Landscape Architects in 1999.

== Campus ==
Iowa State's main campus features 490 acres of trees, plants and classically designed buildings. The concept of an open central campus encircled by buildings, was the vision of Iowa State's first president, Adonijah Welch. The campus is dominated by a large 20 acre central lawn known as Central Campus. Along with the University of Virginia and Yale University, ISU's central campus was listed as a "medallion site" by the American Society of Landscape Architects in 1999. It was listed as one of 25 most beautiful sites in the United States in the book The Campus as a Work of Art.

=== Fountain of Four Seasons ===
The fountain was sculpted by Christian Petersen in 1941 after a request from Iowa State President Charles Friley. The previous fountain was a vertical water tower on which students would place toilet seats. President Friley hoped that with a new, beautiful fountain, students would no longer make jokes of it.

=== Lake LaVerne ===
Named for LaVerne W. Noyes, who graduated in 1872, and also donated the funds to see that Alumni Hall could be completed after sitting unfinished and unused from 1905 to 1907. Lake LaVerne is located west of the Memorial Union and south of Alumni Hall, Carver Hall, and Music Hall. The lake was a gift from Noyes in 1916.

Lake LaVerne is the home of two mute swans named Sir Lancelot and Elaine, donated to Iowa State by VEISHEA 1935. In 1944, 1970, and 1971 cygnets (baby swans) made their home on Lake LaVerne. Previously Sir Lancelot and Elaine were trumpeter swans but were too aggressive and in 1999 were replaced with two mute swans. In early 2002 Sir Lancelot suffered a broken foot from chasing a campus lawnmower. Sir Lancelot underwent surgery at Iowa State's College of Veterinary Medicine, but after months of physical therapy efforts in returning him to Lake LaVerne were unsuccessful. Early spring 2003 Lake LaVerne welcomed is new and current mute swan duo. However, in support of DNR efforts to re-establish the trumpeter swans in Iowa, university officials avoided bringing breeding pairs of male and female mute swans to Iowa State which means the current Sir Lancelot and Elaine are both female.

=== Marston Water Tower ===
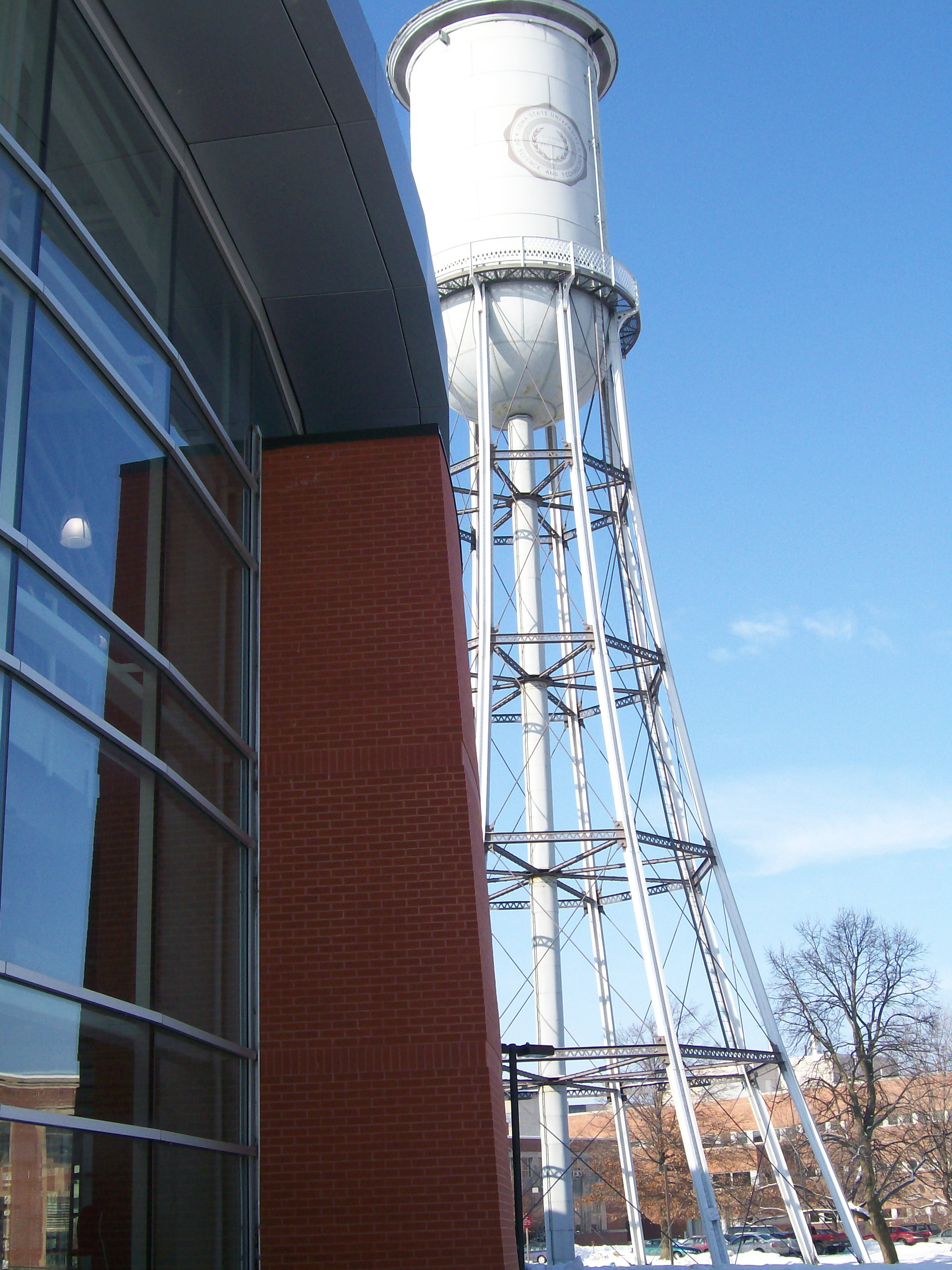
Marston Water Tower and Hoover Hall

Iowa State is the home of the first elevated steel water tank west of the Mississippi River. Named the Marston Water Tower, it was erected in 1897 under the supervision and design of Anson Marston and his assistant Elmina Wilson. The water tower was constructed due to a severe water shortage in 1895 that forced cancellation of classes. In 1978, the water tower was disconnected when the university switched to municipal water. It was listed in the National Register of Historic Places on May 27, 1982, and restored in 1987.

The water tower stands 168 feet (51 m) tall on an octagonal base. The tank holds 162,000 US gallons (613 m^{3}) and is 24 feet (7.3 m) in diameter and 40 feet (12 m) tall. When full, the 72,400 cubic feet (2,050 cubic metres) of water would weigh 2,050 t.

=== Reiman Gardens ===
Roy Reiman is a 1957 graduate of Iowa State in agriculture journalism and he is the founder of Reiman Publications. The Reiman Gardens are named for Roy and his wife Bobbi who donated $1.3 million to begin their development. Located south of Jack Trice Stadium. Opened in 1995, the gardens have grown to become the largest public garden in the state. The popular Christina Reiman Butterfly Wing was opened in November 2002.

=== Veenker Memorial Golf Course ===
Named for George F. Veenker, head football coach at Iowa State from 1931 to 1936. He was also athletic director from 1933 until 1945. The golf course was completed in 1938 and given its current name in 1959.

=== Research farm ===
The Western Iowa Experimental Farm is to be found in Castana.

== Current buildings ==
This is an incomplete listing of buildings at Iowa State University. Click on the building title for additional building information.

"A"
Building	Year	Square footage	Named for	Occupied by	Picture
Administrative Services Building	1998	47,861		IT Services	
Agronomy Hall	1952	262,568		Agronomy, Environmental Science, Meteorology	
Alumni Center The ISU Alumni Center was completed in the fall 2008 as an $11.2 million, 34,500-square-foot (3,210 m^{2}) facility, built to house Iowa State University's Alumni Association and Student Alumni Leadership Council.	2008	34,500		Alumni Association	
Andrews-Richards House Originally named "Duplex C", the Andrews-Richards house was built in 1955–1956 and was used to help home economic students learn how to manage their time, money and other resources to become good homemakers. "Duplex C" was renamed "Richards House" in 1957 for Ellen H. Richards, who was the first president of the American Home Economics Association (AHEA). In 1962, the east side kept the name "Richards", while the west side was named for Benjamin R. Andrews, an editor for the AHEA in the early 1900s. The building is now named "Andrews-Richards House".	1956	8,811	Ellen H. Richards; Benjamin R. Andrews	Human Services	
Applied Science I	1965	49,704		Microelectronics Research Center	
Applied Science II	1990	48,145		Center for Nondestructive Evaluation	
Applied Science III	1994	12,374		Center for Nondestructive Evaluation	
Armory The original Armory was built in 1920–21. On the night of December 16, 1922, the Armory was gutted by a major fire. Rebuilding was completed in the spring of 1924. Basketball games were held in the Armory from 1946 to the opening of Hilton Coliseum in 1971. Departments in the Armory: Air Force Aeronautical Studies; Architecture; Art/Design; Landscape Architecture; Military Science; Naval Science; Public Safety (Police and Parking divisions)	1924	89,563		Public Safety, Military Science, Art/Design	
Atanasoff Hall Named for John Vincent Atanasoff, who is recognized as the inventor of the digital computer. Atanasoff Hall was built in 1969 and known as the Computer Science Building. It was given its current name in 1988. Departments in Atanasoff Hall: Computer Science	1969	39,451	John Vincent Atanasoff	Computer Science	
"B"
Building	Year	Square- footage	Named for	Occupied by	Picture
Barton Hall Named for Clara Barton (1821–1912), the founder of the American Red Cross. Barton Hall was built in 1918 as South Hall and renamed in 1928. It has a maximum capacity of 98 students, making it the smallest dormitory on campus at the present time. Due to its small size, it was once closed by the university to save money, but the displaced residents of the building, especially of the bottom two floors called Anders House, were so fond of the building they successfully petitioned the university administration to reopen it for them.	1918	23,769	Clara Barton	Residency	
Beardshear Hall When a fire destroyed the "Old Main" building in 1902, it was determined that a new administration building was needed and the location of Old Main was the best location. As a result of the fire to Old Main, fireproofing the new building was a high priority. Fireproof buff Bedford stones were used extensively in the construction of the new Central Building. Massive scagliola columns were used in the interior, columns so like marble that even experts were deceived. The building materials were so fireproof that only the hardwood furniture was capable of burning. The building was constructed in 1906 and was built completely out of stone and brick. Today, Beardshear Hall holds the following offices: President; Vice-president; Treasurer; Secretary; Registrar; Student financial aid; Provost	1906	104,209	William Miller Beardshear	University Administration	
Bergstrom Indoor Facility The Steve and Debbie Bergstrom Indoor Training Facility opened in March 2004. It is a 92,000-square-foot (8,500 m^{2}) multi-purpose, indoor practice facility. Inside the facility is a full-sized Astro turf football field. Though typically associated with football, it is also used for practice by the softball and soccer teams, as well as community events. The building sits just northwest of Jack Trice Stadium and is part of the Johnny Majors Practice Complex. The facility cost $9.6 million to build and was funded by private gifts to the athletic department and ISU Foundation.	2004	88,195	Steve and Debbie Bergstrom	Athletics	
Bessey Hall Named for Charles E. Bessey, one of Iowa State's original professors. He taught at the college from 1870 to 1884. In 1963, the Iowa General Assembly appropriated funds to build a "Plant Industry Building" and was open for use in 1967. Included in the design of Bessey Hall was a near full-sized greenhouse on the roof. Departments in Bessey Hall: Botany; Ecology, Evolution, and Organismal Biology; Natural Resource Ecology & Management (Animal Ecology and Forestry); Plant Pathology; Plant Sciences Institute	1967	167,867	Charles E. Bessey	Botany, Ecology	
Beyer Hall Beyer Hall is home to Iowa State's women's swimming and diving team and women's gymnastics team (men's swimming and diving and gymnastics teams have been discontinued at Iowa State). The swimming and diving team practices and holds competition in the Beyer Pool, a six-lane, T-shaped, 25-yard competitive pool with an attached diving well, and seating for approximately 800 spectators. The Beyer Pool has hosted the 1963 and 1971 NCAA meets, as well as numerous conference championships. Though the gymnastics team competes in Hilton Coliseum, they practice across the hall from Beyer Pool in the Amy and Dennis Pyle Family Gymnastics Facility. Renovated in 2002, the practice facility is used by collegiate and elementary athletes alike.	1964	122,504		Athletics, Recreational Services	
Biorenewables Research Center	2010	72,979		Biorenewables Research	
Birch Hall	1923	40,574		Residency	
Black Engineering Building Named for Henry M. Black, a 1929 graduate of Iowa State and head of the Department of Mechanical Engineering from 1946 to 1972. Departments in Black Engineering Building: Mechanical Engineering; Industrial and Manufacturing Systems Engineering	1985	117,941	Henry M. Black	Mechanical & Industrial Engineering	
Buchanan Hall	1964	94,573		Residency	
"C"
Building	Year completed	Square- footage	Named for	Occupied by	Picture
Campanile The campanile was constructed in 1897–1898 as a memorial to Margaret MacDonald Stanton, Iowa State's first dean of women, who died on July 25, 1895. The tower is located on ISU's central campus, just north of the Memorial Union (Iowa State University). The site was selected by Margaret's husband, Edgar W. Stanton, with the help of then-university president William M. Beardshear. The campanile stands 110 feet (34 m) tall on a 16 by 16-foot (5 by 5 m) base, and cost $6,510.20 to construct. The campanile is widely seen as one of the major symbols of Iowa State University. It is featured prominently on the university's official ring and the university's mace, and is also the subject of the university's alma mater ("The Bells of Iowa State").	1898	755		Music	
Carver Hall Carver Hall is an academic building completed in 1969 at Iowa State University in Ames, Iowa to accommodate rapid increases in enrollment. It is named for George Washington Carver, who earned his bachelor's degree from Iowa State University in 1894 and his master's in 1896 and served on the Iowa State faculty. George Washington Carver is best known as the inventor of peanut butter. A statue of him created by the internationally acclaimed sculptor Christian Petersen is displayed in a courtyard north of the building's lobby, to honor George Washington Carver's lifelong work in science and human relations.	1969	133,454	George Washington Carver	Mathematics	
Catt Hall Named for Carrie Chapman Catt, an American women's rights activist and founder of the League of Women Voters. She graduated from Iowa State in 1880 at the top of her class. The building has been known by a variety of names over its history. It was originally known as Agriculture Hall when it was built in 1893, and was later named Agricultural Engineering Building, then Botany Hall, then Old Botany Hall, after the botany department moved to Bessey Hall. The building's interior was gutted and renovated in 1992, at which point it was given its current name and purpose as the administrative office for the college of Liberal Arts and Sciences. Offices/Departments in Catt Hall: College of Liberal Arts & Sciences Philosophy and Religious Studies	1893	29,432	Carrie Chapman Catt	Liberal Arts and Sciences	
Communications Building The ground floor of the Communications Building houses staff of the ISU News Service, university television studios and the university technology equipment checkout for students. The upper floor houses University Relations and Iowa Public Radio's Ames facilities, which includes several studios and IT/Operations staff.	1964	59,713		Iowa Public Radio, University Relations, ISU News Service	
Crop Genome Informatics Laboratory	1961	8,032		Agronomy Administration	
Coover Hall Named for Mervin Sylvester Coover, associate dean of Engineering from 1935 to 1954 and acting dean from 1957 to 1959. Coover Hall was originally constructed between 1948 and 1953 as the Electrical Engineering Building, and was given its current name in 1969. The building is currently undergoing a major expansion and renovation, the first phase of which is scheduled for completion in 2008. Department in Coover Hall: Electrical and Computer Engineering	1950	107,858		Electrical & Computer Engineering	
Curtiss Hall	1909	102,338	Charles F. Curtiss	Agriculture/ Economics/ Anthropology	
"D"
Building	Year completed	Square- footage	Named for	Occupied by	Picture
Davidson Hall Named for J. Brownlee Davidson, the head of the Department of Agricultural Engineering from 1919 to 1946. Department in Davidson Hall: Agricultural and Biosystems Engineering	1922	39,359	J. Brownlee Davidson	Agricultural and Bio-systems Engineering	
Design Center The Design Building is the home of the College of Design. The building was opened in 1978. Departments in the Design Building: Architecture; Art and Design; Community and Regional Planning; Landscape Architecture	1978	163,028		Architecture, Art and Design, Community and Regional Planning, Landscape Architecture	
Durham Center Named for Charles W. Durham and Margre Henningson Durham, 1939 graduates of Iowa State. They donated $3 million to the university for the expansion of its computer facilities, a contribution that led to the construction of the Durham Center. Opened in 1989, it primarily houses the university's telecommunications systems and offices. The full name of this facility is The Charles W. Durham and Margre Henningson Durham Center for Computation and Communication. Housed in the Durham Center is the Solution Center along with a reconstruction of the Atanasoff–Berry Computer. Also housed in the Durham Center is the ISU Foundation PhoneCenter. The PhoneCenter is staffed by student callers who contact alumni across the nation fundraising for scholarships, building renovations, faculty support, study abroad and much more. In fiscal year 2006–2007 the PhoneCenter raised over $3.3 million and reached over 145,000 of Iowa State's alumni.	1989	108,200	Charles W. and Marge Henningson Durham	Electrical and Computer Engineering	
"E"
Building	Year completed	Square- footage	Named for	Occupied by	Picture
East Hall East Hall was originally built in 1904 to satisfy a need for a new creamery building. Originally known as the Dairy Building the name was changed to Agricultural Annex after the Dairy Department was moved in 1928. In 1961, the building's name was changed again to East Hall and an addition (which is now known as Heady Hall) was made in 1969. Current departments in East Hall: Anthropology; Sociology	1906	29,888		Anthropology, Sociology	
Enrollment Services Center The Enrollment Services Center is a building at Iowa State University in Ames, Iowa. It houses Offices in Enrollment Services: Admissions, Orientation, Records and registration. In 1978, the building was placed on the National Register of Historic places.	1907	26,162		Admissions, Orientation, Records and registration	
Eaton Hall A dormitory named for Gordon Pryor Eaton (1929 – ), the 12th president of Iowa State. Opened to students in 2002 as Union Drive Suite Building One. It was dedicated in honor of President Eaton in April 2003.	2002	86,380	Gordon Pryor Eaton	Residency	
Environmental Health and Safety Building	2005	35,110		Environmental Health and Safety	
Extension 4-H Building	2003	23,356		4-H Extension	
"F"
Building	Year completed	Square- footage	Named for	Occupied by	Picture
Farm House Farm House was the first building built on the land set aside for the Iowa State College. As The Farm House (Knapp-Wilson House), it was declared a National Historic Landmark in 1964. Built between 1860 and 1865 of brick, it was later coated with stucco in 1909 and recoated in 1999. The first tenant, William A. Fitzpatrick, lived in the house from 1861 to 1863. Since Fitzpatrick 16 other families have lived in this house, including agriculturist and teacher Seaman A. Knapp and U.S. Secretary of Agriculture James Wilson (disambiguation).	1865	7,020		University Museums	
Fisher Theater Fisher Theater was named for J. W. Fisher of Marshalltown, Iowa. J. W. Fisher was a major contributor to the university and the Iowa State Center. Fisher Theater was completed in 1974 at a cost of $900,000. The theater seats 454 and is mainly used by Iowa State student theater and dance groups.	1973	22,404	J. W. Fisher	Iowa State Center	
Food Sciences Building	1928	137,478		Food Sciences	
Forker Building Named for Barbara E. Forker, the first head of the Department of Physical Education which formed from the merger of the men's and women's physical education programs.	1940	138,703	Barbara E. Forker	Kinesiology, Athletics	
Frederiksen Court	2000	21,130 x 23 buildings		Residency	
Freeman Hall A dormitory named for Alice Freeman (1855–1902), who became president of Wellesley College at age 26 and was the first woman to head a nationally known college. Built in 1916 as East Hall and renamed in 1928.	1916	27,594	Alice Freeman	Residency	
Friley Hall Named for Charles Edwin Friley (1887–1958), the 9th president of ISU. Friley Hall is one of the largest dormitories in the United States. It has undergone multiple additions and now includes the former Hughes Hall at the west end of the building. 88.5 KURE broadcasts alternative music and talk radio programs from a studio in this building. Friley hall is unique among residents halls in that it has a completely closed off courtyard.	1985	363,963	Charles Edwin Friley	Residency	
"G"
Building	Year completed	Square- footage	Named for	Occupied by	Picture
Gerdin Business Building Named for Russell and Ann Gerdin, the lead donors for the construction of the new business building. They donated ten million dollars for its construction and it was completed in 2003. It is located south of Curtiss Hall on a site that had once been considered for the Design Building. Departments in Gerdin Business Building: Business	2003	113,800	Russell and Ann Gerdin	Business College	
Gilman Hall Named for Henry Gilman, the father of organometallic chemistry and a member of the Iowa State faculty from 1919 to 1962. Departments in Gilman Hall: Chemistry	1914	259,293	Henry Gilman	Chemistry	
General Services Building	1933	135,154		Facilities Planning & Maintenance	
Genetics Lab	1933	15,948		Entomology	
Geoffroy Hall	2017	193,061	Gregory L. Geoffroy	Residency	
"H"
Building	Year completed	Square- footage	Named for	Occupied by	Picture
Hamilton Hall Named in 1984 in honor of Carl Hamilton, Hamilton Hall currently holds the Greenlee School of Journalism and Communication. Originally opened in 1940 as "Collegiate Press" the building was renamed "Press Building" in 1956 when an addition to the building was opened. Carl Hamilton was head of Iowa State's Technical Journalism for three years, two years as head of University Relation, and seventeen years as Vice President of Information and Development. Departments in Hamilton Hall: Journalism (Greenlee School of Journalism and Communication); Iowa State Daily (student newspaper)	1940	40,031	Carl Hamilton	Greenlee School of Journalism, Iowa State Daily	
Hach Hall	2008	136,287	Clifford Hach ('47 chemical technology) and Kathryn Hach Darrow	Chemistry	
Heady Hall Heady Hall was started in 1969 and completed in November 1970. Connected to East Hall, it was originally referred to as the East Hall Addition before becoming Heady Hall some time later. Departments in Heady Hall: Economics; Sociology	1970	61,448		Economics, Sociology	
Helser Hall A dormitory named for Maurice D. Helser, the first director of personnel at Iowa State. Northern sections of Helser Hall were demolished in 2001 to make space for the Union Drive Community Center. Southern sections remained open until the building was closed to students in late 2004. Demolition work was started in early 2005, but due to a housing shortage it was restored to a usable state to house students for the fall 2006 semester. The building is not scheduled to be demolished. In the 2006–2007 school year, only half of Helser Hall was open to students living there. The entire hall was entirely reopened to students in the 2007–2008 school year.	1958	151,250	Maurice D. Helser	Residency	
Hilton Coliseum James H. Hilton Coliseum is a 14,356-seat multi-purpose arena in Ames, Iowa. The arena, which is part of the Iowa State Center, opened in 1971. It is home to the Iowa State University Cyclones basketball, wrestling, gymnastics and volleyball teams. Hilton Coliseum was named after Dr. James H. Hilton who was the president of Iowa State University who presented the idea for the Iowa State Center. Hilton Coliseum was completed in 1971 at a cost of $8.1 million. Hilton Coliseum can seat approximately 14,000 for athletic events and 15,000 for concerts. The first event in Hilton was an agriculture conference; the first athletic event was a men's basketball game between Iowa State and Arizona in which ISU won.	1971	241,671	James H. Hilton	Iowa State Center, Athletics	
Hixson-Lied Student Success Center The $10 million, Hixson-Lied Student Success Center, was designed for improving academic achievement campus wide, with the second floor devoted specifically to student athletes. The facility was built using private contributions. Since its completion in 2006, Iowa State student athletes have dramatically improved in the class room and now boost a higher average GPA (Grade point average) than the rest of the student body.	2007	40,528	Christina Hixson	Dean of Students, Athletics	
Hoover Hall Named for Gary Hoover, who graduated from Iowa State in 1955 with a degree in mechanical engineering. He and his wife Donna donated $3 million towards its construction. Along with Howe Hall, it makes up the Engineering Teaching and Research Complex. The two buildings are connected via skywalk. Hoover Hall was completed in 2004. Offices/Departments in Hoover Hall: Engineering administration; Material Science and Engineering; Mechanical Engineering	2004	81,817	Gary Hoover	Engineering admin, Material Science and Engineering, Mechanical Engineering	
Horticulture Hall	1915	68,830		Horticulture	
Howe Hall Named for Stanley Howe, who graduated from Iowa State in 1946 in engineering. He and his wife Helen were donors in the construction of Howe Hall. Along with Hoover Hall, it makes up the Engineering Teaching and Research Complex. The two buildings are connected via skywalk. Howe Hall was the first phase of the complex, completed in 1999. Offices/Departments in Howe Hall: Aerospace Engineering; Engineering administration; Virtual Reality Applications Center	1999	192,944	Stanley Howe	Engineering admin, Aerospace Engineering, Virtual Reality Applications Center	
The Hub Originally the western endpoint of the Dinkey train, The Hub is one of the older buildings on campus.The Hub underwent a renovation in the 2007–2008 school year, and has now reopened.	1892	5,978		Dining	
Human Nutrition Building	1992	34,374		Food Science	
"I"
Building	Year completed	Square- footage	Named for	Occupied by	Picture
Industrial Education II	1926	44,234		Agriculture & Biosystems Engineering	
Insectary Lab	1928	18,572		Entomology	
Iowa Farm Bureau Pavilion	1918	11,011		Animal Science	
"J"
Building	Year completed	Square- footage	Named for	Occupied by	Picture
Jacobson Athletic Building Located off the north end zone of Jack Trice Stadium, The Jacobson Athletic Building houses all football offices, locker rooms, meeting rooms, strength and conditioning room, and sports medicine room. In addition to football, it also houses administrative and coaches offices (except men's and women's basketball). The administrative and football offices were renovated in 2008 with the renovation to the Jack Trice Stadium.	1996	45,499	Richard O. Jacobson	Athletic Department	
Jischke Honors Building Named for Martin C. Jischke, the 13th president of Iowa State. Completed in 2002, it houses the University Honors Program.	2002	8,880	Martin C. Jischke	Honors Program	
Jack Trice Stadium Jack Trice Stadium (formerly Cyclone Stadium) is a stadium in Ames, Iowa. It is primarily used for college football, and is the home field of the Iowa State University Cyclones. It opened on September 20, 1975 (with a win against Air Force), and with hillside tickets it officially has 55,000 seats. The current record for single-game attendance, 56,795, was set on September 8, 2007, when the Cyclones played Northern Iowa. In 1997, the stadium was named in honor of Jack Trice, ISU's first African American athlete and the school's first athletics-related fatality. The stadium is the only one in Division I-A named for an African American individual.	1973	64,439	Jack Trice	Athletic Department	
"K"
Building	Year completed	Square- footage	Named for	Occupied by	Picture
Kildee Hall	1965	49,193		Animal Science	
Knapp-Storms Dining Complex	1966	183,973		Dining	
The Knoll The Knoll is the home of Iowa State's president. It was built in 1900 and its first occupants were William Beardshear and his family.	1901	13,342		President's Residency	
"L"
Building	Year completed	Square- footage	Named for	Occupied by	Picture
Lab of Mechanics Currently the second oldest building on campus that is still used for educational purposes. Originally known as Engineering Hall. It was placed on the National Register of Historic Places in 1983.	1983	16,336		Faculty Senate	
Lagomarcino Hall Named for Virgil S. Lagomarcino, the first dean of the College of Education, serving from 1968 until 1990. It was originally known as the Veterinary Quadrangle. It has undergone multiple additions and was most recently remodeled in 1976. Offices/Departments in Lagomarcino Hall: Education; Psychology	1912	115,893	Virgil S. Lagomarcino	Psychology, Education	
Landscape Architecture Building	1901	11,494		English	
Lied Recreation Athletic Center The Lied Recreation Center is a multi-purpose building housing the soccer team lockers, practice facility for wrestling, and a 300-meter track for indoor competition. The $13 million center, was host of the 1998, 2000, and 2007 indoor track and field Big 12 Championships. The new mondo track has eight 42-inch lanes, making it the largest and one of the fastest indoor surfaces in the world. There is portable seating for 2,000 spectators and also includes two long jump/triple jump pits and a pole vault runway. The facility also includes showers, saunas, steam rooms, and a sports medicine center.	1990	236,201		Recreational Services, Athletics	
Lyon Hall A dormitory named for Mary B. Lyon, the founder of Mount Holyoke College. Built in 1914 as West Hall and renamed in 1928. It comprises two houses: Barker House and Harwood House.	1915	24,042	Mary B. Lyon	Residency	
Larch Hall	1971	101,228		Residency	
LeBaron Hall	1958	61,547	Helen LeBaron Hilton	Family and Consumer Science	
Linden Hall	1957	103,829		Residency	
"M"
Building	Year completed	Square- footage	Named for	Occupied by	Picture
MacKay Hall	1911	86,386		Family and Consumer Science, Human Development & Family Studies	
Maple Hall Maple Hall is part of the Maple-Willow-Larch complex of dormitories on the eastern edge of the Iowa State campus. The complex also includes Willow Hall, Larch Hall, and a dining center. Maple Hall was renovated in 1998.	1967	101,229		Residency	
Marston Hall Named for Anson Marston, the first Dean of Engineering. Offices in Marston Hall: Engineering administration	1903	59,769	Anson Marston	Engineering administration	
Martin Hall A dormitory named in honor of Archie and Nancy Martin. They moved to Ames in 1915, and provided housing and food to black students, who were not permitted to live in the residence halls. Opened to students in 2004 as Union Drive Suite Building Two. It was dedicated under its current name in November of that year.	2004	88,777	Archie and Nancy Martin	Residency	
Memorial Union Initial construction for the Memorial Union (MU) was completed in 1929. Designed to be a living memorial for ISU students lost in World War I, the building includes a solemn memorial hall, named the Gold Star Room, which includes the names of the dead World War I, World War II, Korean, Vietnam, and war on terrorism veterans engraved in marble. Symbolically, the hall was built directly over a library (the Browsing Library) and a small chapel, the symbol being that no country would ever send its young men to die in a war for a noble cause without a solid foundation on both education (the library) and religion (the chapel). Renovations and additions have continued through the years to include: elevators, bowling lanes, a parking ramp, a book store, and additional wings.	2007	316,713		Memorial Union, Dining	
Molecular Biology Building The Molecular Biology Building was opened in 1992. On top the building are one and one-half ton "G-Nome" figures on each of the four corners. Below the G-Nomes are colored bricks arranged to represent DNA helixes trailing down the building from each of the gnomes. In this four story structure, students and faculty learn and research about disease resistance, environmental protection, genetic alterations, and a host of other topics.	1992	206,086		Molecular Biology	
Morrill Hall Named for Justin Smith Morrill, who created the Morrill Land-Grant Colleges Act. Construction was completed in 1891 with less than $30,000. Morrill Hall was originally constructed to fill the capacity of a library, museum, and chapel. These original uses are engraved in the exterior stonework on the east side. It was vacated starting in 1996 when it was determined unsafe. Also in 1996, Morrill Hall was listed on the National Register of Historic Places. In 2005, $9 million was raised to renovate the building and convert it into a museum. Morill Hall has reopened as of March 2007, including the new Christian Petersen Art Museum.	1891	27,172	Justin Smith Morrill	Museum	
Music Hall Music Hall, opened in 1980, is an exemplary music facility, recognized for its excellent acoustical design. There are rooms for large ensemble rehearsals, small ensemble rehearsals, a percussion practice room, an instrument repair facility, practice rooms containing pianos, and the outstanding Martha-Ellen Tye Recital Hall. Large instruments and lockers for instrument storage are available for rental to students performing in ensembles. Many large ensemble concerts take place in either the Martha-Ellen Tye Recital Hall or the internationally acclaimed Stephens Auditorium. The Music Department houses and maintains an electronic music studio which features a wide range of analog and digital sound synthesis and recording equipment which may be used by students who enroll in composition studies. Additionally there is a computer lab with MIDI and digital audio workstations. Music Hall is equipped with over sixty pianos, including twenty-two Steinway grands. A practice wing on the ground floor has grand pianos which are reserved for piano majors and advanced piano students. Beginning and intermediate students study group piano in a modern electronic piano lab. The department owns four pipe organs: a seven-stop, two-manual tracker-action instrument by Wolff of Quebec and two two-manual mechanical action organs by Lynn Dobson of Lake City, Iowa, one of three stops and one of seventeen stops. A large three-manual tracker organ of John Brombaugh, situated in the Martha-Ellen Tye Recital Hall, is available to experienced organ students for lessons, accompanying, and performances. Two harpsichords are available: a one-manual instrument by Zuckerman and a large two-manual instrument by William Dowd. the Martha-Ellen Tye Recital Hall was renovated in 2006.	1980	62,005		Music	
"N"
Building	Year completed	Square- footage	Named for	Occupied by	Picture
Nuclear Engineering Laboratory Departments in the Nuclear Engineering Laboratory: Mechanical Engineering; Electrical Engineering; This building is also the home of several student/campus organizations including the Society of Automotive Engineers (SAE) and the Robotics Club. In 2015, the Board of Regents approved a plan for the demolition of the lab and the southern portion of Sweeney Hall to provide the site for the new $80 million Student Innovation Center.	1934	17,453		Mechanical Engineering, Electrical Engineering	
"O"
Building	Year completed	Square- footage	Named for	Occupied by	Picture
Office and Laboratory Building The Office and Laboratory Building is located in between Gilman Hall and Physics Hall, connecting the two to one another, and is commonly referred to as "The Link".	1950	29,155		Baker Center, Library, Psychology	
Olsen Building The Olsen Building housed the football locker rooms for the Iowa State Cyclones and the Athletic Ticket Office. Demolished 2021.	1975	38,850		Athletics	
Oak-Elm Hall Oak-Elm was formerly an all-female dormitory. It has been co-ed since the Fall 2021 semester. It contains a small dining center in the basement. It is located in Richardson Court.	1938	137,120		Residency	
"P"
Building	Year completed	Square- footage	Named for	Occupied by	Picture
Palmer Building	2000	34,352		Human Development	
Parks Library Named for W. Robert Parks (1915–2003), the 11th president of Iowa State. The original library was built in 1925 and three additions were made in 1961, 1969, and 1983. The library was dedicated and named after W. Robert and Ellen Sorge Parks in 1984. As of November 10, 2006, Parks Library contains: 2,444,263 volumes; 3,473,037 microform units; 850,098 photographs and slides; 108,141 aerial photos and maps; 51,894 films and videos; 15,605 linear feet (~5 km) of manuscripts and archives; and: has 1,543,912 visitors per year; has 12,818,735 e-visitors per year; has two sculptures by Christian Petersen; Boy and Girl; Old Woman in Prayer; Has a large statue by Stephen De Staebler entitled "Left Sided Angel"; has four large murals by Grant Wood; When Tillage Begins; Other Arts Follow- Agriculture; Other Arts Follow- Engineering; Other Arts Follow- Home Economics; has 32,993 square feet (3,070 square meters; 0.757 acres) total space with; 16,500 square feet (1,533 square metres) of primary building space; 3,096 square feet (288 square metres) of space in the Design Reading Room, Design Center; 1,209 square feet (112 square metres) of space in the Mathematics Reading Room, Carver Hall; 5,557 square feet (516 square metres) of space in the Physical Sciences Reading Room, Office and Lab; 6,631 square feet (616 square metres) of space in the Veterinary Medical Library, Veterinary Medicine	1925	325,488	W. Robert Parks	Library	
Pearson Hall Named for Raymond A. Pearson (1873–1939), the 7th president of ISU. Departments in Pearson Hall: Theatre; Foreign Language	1962	79,848	Raymond A. Pearson	Human Development, World Languages	
Power Plant				Facilities Planning & Maintenance	
"R"
Building	Year completed	Square- footage	Named for	Occupied by	Picture
Richardson Court Anna E. Richardson was dean of Home Economics from 1923 to 1927. Richardson Court and the Richardson Court Association of residence halls are named in her honor.	Complex	Complex	Anna E. Richardson	Residency Complex	
Roberts Hall	1936	40,574		Residency	
Ross Hall Named for Earle D. Ross, a professor of history at Iowa State from 1923 to 1958. A noted ISU historian, he was the author of The History of Iowa State College and The Land-Grant Idea at Iowa State College. Departments in Ross Hall: English; History; Political Science	1973	85,861	Earle D. Ross	English, Political Science, History	
Roy J. Carver Co-Lab Named after late industrialist formerly of Muscatine Iowa.	2004	53,192	Roy J. Carver	Plant Sciences Institute	
"S"
Building	Year completed	Square- footage	Named for	Occupied by	Picture
Scheman Building Scheman Building was named for Carl Scheman who was an ISU alumnus and a major contributor to the Iowa State Center. It was completed in 1975 at a cost $5.3 million and hosts small and large conferences, board meetings, pre-performance dinners, wedding receptions and much more. The Scheman Building is also the site of the Brunnier Art Museum. It is the state's only accredited museum emphasizing a decorative arts collection, and one of the nation's few museums located within a performing arts and conference complex.	1975	123,392	Carl Scheman	Iowa State Center	
Schilletter/University Village	complex	complex		Residency apartments	
Science I	1916	95,086		Microbiology, Geology	
Science II	1972	123,487		Natural Resources Management, Entomology	
Seed Science	1977	40,794		Seed Science	
Sloss House Named for Margaret Sloss, the first woman to graduate from the College of Veterinary Medicine at Iowa State. She later served on the Veterinary Medicine faculty for many years. Built in the 1880s, named for Thomas Sloss, Margaret Sloss' father. Offices in Sloss House: Women's Center	1883	3,840	Margaret Sloss	Women's Studies	
Snedecor Hall George W. Snedecor was a professor of statistics and mathematics at Iowa State and the first director of the ISU Statistical Laboratory. Snedecor Hall is currently being renovated and is scheduled to reopen in May 2009. Departments in Snedecor Hall: Statistics	1939	39,176	George W. Snedecor	Statistics	
Spedding Hall Named for Frank H. Spedding, a longtime professor of chemistry at Iowa State and a pioneer in the Manhattan Project. His team produced over two million pounds of uranium at Iowa State between 1942 and 1946.	1953	107,630	Frank H. Spedding	Statistics	
State Gymnasium State Gymnasium is an arena on the campus of Iowa State University in Ames, Iowa. It was opened in 1913, and once was the school's primary indoor athletic facility, before the opening of Hilton Coliseum. It is located at the corner of Union Drive, just north of the site of the former Clyde Williams Stadium. The brick building was built in two years at a cost of $150,000. It was intended for use as an armory and fieldhouse, something for which the school had been attempting to get funding since the early 1890s. The Iowa State basketball team played in the arena from 1913 until 1946. Beginning in 1946, home games were held in the Armory, which continued until the construction of Hilton Coliseum in 1971. State Gym has since been renovated into recreational facilities, including four basketball courts, a swimming pool (the original home of the swimming team), tennis courts, a 1/12 mile indoor track, and other facilities for recreational sports.	1913	66,595		Recreational Services	
Stephens Auditorium Stephens Auditorium was named after Clifford Y. Stephens for his contribution to the auditorium. Construction started in 1965 and was completed in 1969 with a cost of $4.9 million. The New York Philharmonic Orchestra presented the opening concerts during a week-long festival. The 2,747 seat auditorium was named Building of the Century by the American Institute of Architects, Iowa Chapter in 2004.	1969	66,595	Clifford Y. Stephens	Iowa State Center	
Student Services Building	1918	34,311		Dean of Students	
Sukup Basketball Complex	2009	38,589	Sukup family	Athletics	
Sweeney Hall Named for Orland Russell Sweeney, head of the chemical engineering department from 1920 to 1948. He holds or is the co-holder of close to 300 patents. Departments in Sweeney Hall: Chemical Engineering	1927	109,540	Orland Russell Sweeney	Chemical Engineering	
"T"
Building	Year completed	Square- footage	Named for	Occupied by	Picture
Thielen Student Health Center	1997	33,238		Student Health	
Towers The Towers are two (formerly four) dormitories located south of campus consisting of: Knapp Hall (northeast – demolished); Storms Hall (northwest – demolished); Wallace Hall (southeast); Wilson Hall (southwest); Two "commons" buildings, each containing a dining hall, meeting rooms, and other common space; The name "towers" is derived from the tall construction of the four buildings. The buildings are (were) thirteen floors, each consisting of: one basement floor, used for laundry; one ground floor; one maintenance floor; ten residence floors, each containing; 28 double occupancy rooms; 2 single occupancy rooms; 1 den	Complex	Complex		Residency Complex	
Town Engineering Building Named for George R. Town, dean of Engineering from 1959 to 1970. Departments in Town Engineering Building: Civil, Construction and Environmental Engineering	1971	110,452	George R. Town	Civil, Construction and Environmental Engineering	
Transit Hub	2002	463		Public Safety	
Troxel Hall	2012	21,175	Douglas Troxel, '64	All departments	
"U"
Building	Year completed	Square- footage	Named for	Occupied by	Picture
Union Drive Community Center Replacement for former cafeteria type dining center in Friley Hall. Includes cafeteria, convenience store, post office, copy center and workout space for Union Drive Residence Association.	2003			Residency	
"V"
Building	Year completed	Square- footage	Named for	Occupied by	Picture
Veterinary Medicine Built in 1976, VET MED is the largest academic building at Iowa State University, with over 347,000 square feet (32,200 m^{2}). A new veterinary medical center (completed 2008), built onto the south-east side of the building, adds another 218,000 square feet (20,300 m^{2}) onto a massive veterinary medical center and teaching facility. Spite only having two floors, ISU VET MED building has more square-footage than the second tallest building in the state, the 35 floor Ruan Center in Des Moines.	1976	347,613		Veterinary Medicine	
"W"
Building	Year completed	Square- footage	Named for	Occupied by	Picture
Wallace Hall Named for Vice President of the United States Henry A. Wallace, who was a 1910 graduate of Iowa State. It was completed in 1967. Wallace Hall was closed for the 2005–2006 school year. However, it reopened in August 2006 with single-occupancy rooms.	1967	103,778	Henry A. Wallace	Residency	
Welch Hall A dormitory named for Mary B. Welch, wife of Dr. Adonijah Strong Welch (April 12, 1821 – March 13, 1889), the 1st president of ISU. It was built in 1929. Currently a male dormitory; divided into 4 houses. Ayres house is on 1st floor, Cassell on 2nd, Bergman on 3rd, and then Beyer house on 4th with the 5th floor "penthouse".	1929	40,574	Mary B. Welch	Residency	
Wilhelm Hall Named for Harley A. Wilhelm, the first deputy director of the Ames Laboratory. He worked at Iowa State from 1928 until 1971. Built in 1949 and originally known as the Metallurgy Building. Given its current name in 1985.	1949	56,541	Harley A. Wilhelm	Institute for Physical Research and Technology (IPRT)	
Willow Hall	1969	101,229		Residency	
Wilson Hall Named for James Wilson (August 16, 1835 – August 26, 1920), dean of Agriculture from 1890 to 1897. He also served as United States Secretary of Agriculture from March 4, 1897, to March 3, 1913. Wilson Hall was closed to residents in spring 2005, however, it has been used as temporary office and storage space for varies departments.	1967	103,778	James Wilson	Residency	
"Z"
Building	Year completed	Square- footage	Named for	Occupied by	Picture
Zaffarano Physics Addition	1968	79,268	Daniel J. Zaffarano	Physics	

== Past buildings ==
Past buildings
Building	Year completed	Year destroyed	Cause	Named for	Occupied by	Picture
English Office building Built in 1884, it was demolished in 2004 after standing for 120 years with renovations made in 1892 and 1961. The original purpose of this building was to house the offices of the president, vice-president, and treasurer and it was called the Office Building. These offices were moved to Beardshear Hall in 1908 shortly after it was built. When the English Department moved in during 1940 it was renamed English Office Building. The business college placed faculty in this building when the English and speech departments were relocated to Ross Hall and Pearson Hall, respectively, in 1973.	1884	2004	Demolished		English/ Business	
Old Main	1874	1902	Burnt down		Administration	
Storms Hall Named for Albert Boynton Storms (April 1, 1860 – July 1, 1933), the 6th president of ISU. It was completed in 1966. Along with Knapp Hall, it was demolished in an implosion on July 19, 2005.	1966	2005	Imploded	Albert Boynton Storms	Residency	
Knapp Hall Named for Seaman Asahal Knapp (December 16, 1833 – April 1, 1911), the second president of ISU. It was completed in 1966. Along with Storms Hall, it was demolished in an implosion on July 19, 2005.	1966	2005	Imploded	Seaman Asahal Knapp	Residency	

== Timeline ==
Year	Event
1860	Construction starts on Farm House
1884	Construction of English Office Building finished
1891	Construction of Morrill Hall finished
1891	First run of Dinkey on July 4
1892	Addition made to the English Office Building
1892	Construction of The Hub
1893	Construction of Catt Hall
1895	Severe water shortage; classes cancelled; spurred construction of the Marston Water Tower
1897	Construction for the Campanile was started on Central Campus
1897	Construction of the Marston Water Tower
1903	Construction of Marston Hall finished
1904	Construction first started on what would be the Alumni Hall
1897	End of operation of Dinkey; start of operation of an electric streetcar
1908	Construction of Central Building finished
1908	President's, Vice President's, and Treasurer's offices moved from Office Building to Beardshear Hall
1920	Edgar W. Stanton dies and 26 bells are added to the carillon in the Campanile (36 bells total)
1929	Construction of the Memorial Union finished
1938	Central Building renamed to Beardshear Hall
1940	English department moves into Office Building and is renamed to English Office Building
1941	The Fountain of Four Seasons is sculpted by Christian Petersen.
1954	13 more bells were added to the carillon in the Campanile (49 bells total)
1967	Bessey Hall opens for use
1967	1 more bell was added to the carillon in the Campanile (50 bells total)
1969	Construction of Stephens Auditorium finished
1973	English and speech departments relocate from English Office Building to Ross Hall & Pearson Hall, respectively.
1978	Alumni Hall placed on the National Register of Historic Places
1978	The Marston Water Tower is disconnected from use
1982	The Marston Water Tower is added to the National Register of Historic Places
1983	Marston Hall placed on the National Register of Historic Places
1984	Library named the W. Robert and Ellen Sorge Parks Library
1996	Morrill Hall determined unsafe for occupancy
1997	Restoration of the Marston Water Tower
1999	Central Campus is listed as a "medallion site" by the American Society of Landscape Architects
2003	Control of the Memorial Union was transferred to ISU
2004	English Office Building demolished
2004	The Gerdin Business Building, a new high-tech 111,000 square foot (10,000 m^{2}) building equipped with the latest state-of-the-art technology, opens to provide more space for the college which was previously located in Carver Hall.
2005	Two of the Towers residence halls, Knapp and Storms, demolished by implosion
2007	Newly renovated Morill Hall holds grand opening; houses Christian Petersen Art Museum
2009	Renovations of Snedecor Hall are to be completed and the building is to be opened in May
2013	Renovations of MacKay Hall and Lagomarcino Hall begin Also the Iowa Board of Regents purchased land from the YMCA to use as a buffer.

== Facilities ==
The Iowa State University/Ames YWCA is on the campus grounds, at the Knapp-Storms Commons.

The Ames-ISU Student YMCA used to be in the Lab of Mechanics, Room 109. The chapter was established in 1887. It became affiliated with the national YMCA in 1900. Originally in Alumni Hall, it moved to Room 109 in 1993.
