= Food Sciences Building =

- Christian Petersen Courtyard Sculptures, and Dairy Industry Building
- U.S. National Register of Historic Places
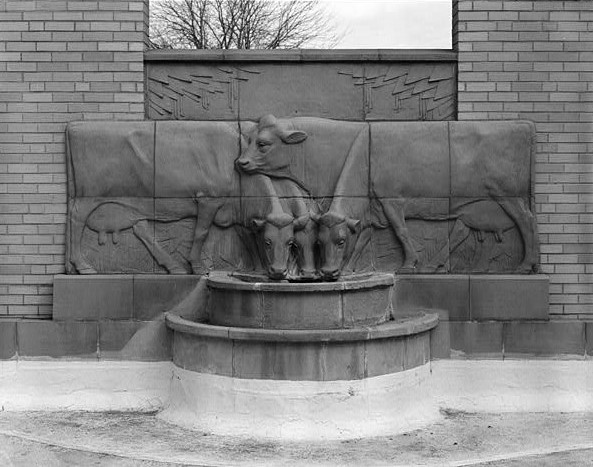
- One of Christian Petersen's sculptures.

- Location within Iowa Location within the United States
- Location: Wallace Rd., between Beach and Union Dr. on the Iowa State University campus, Ames, Iowa
- Coordinates: 42°01′37″N 93°38′34″W
- Area: less than one acre
- Built: 1927-1928
- Built by: J. and W. A. Elliott Construction
- Architect: Christian Petersen; Proudfoot, Rawson & Souers
- NRHP reference No.: 87000020
- Added to NRHP: April 7, 1987

The Food Sciences Building, formerly known as Dairy Industry Building, is a historic building on the campus of Iowa State University in Ames, Iowa, United States. The two-story, Bedford stone structure was designed by the Des Moines architectural firm of Proudfoot, Rawson & Souers. J. and W. A. Elliott Construction completed it in 1928. Additions to the original building were completed in 1962, 1991, and 1993. It was listed, along with its courtyard sculptures, on the National Register of Historic Places in 1987.

== Christian Petersen Courtyard Sculptures ==
The building itself is not as significant as the Depression era artwork contained within it. Christian Petersen, a Danish immigrant, designed and completed the nine bas reliefs from 1934 to 1935 as part of the Public Works of Art Project (PWPA). Two plaster-cast panels are located in the foyer. One depicts a woman from biblical times churning butter in a goatskin bag hung from a tree, and the other depicts an American pioneer women using a dash churn, an early American invention. They were completed in 1934.

The seven courtyard bas reliefs were designed in an Iowa City workshop, and the terra cotta panels were created using a kiln designed by Paul E. Cox, a professor of ceramic engineering at what was then Iowa State College. The use of terra cotta for the panels was rare by the 1930s. The central panel depicts three Jersey cows and a bull located above the basin of a semicircular double-tiered fountain that flows into a reflecting pool. The panels on the left depict the early American era of hand milking, transporting the raw milk by wagon to the market, separating milk, and butter churning. The panels on the right depict the modern (1934) dairy plant at Iowa State. They include scenes of mechanical milking machines, a "Babcock" testing machine and a power centrifugal separator, and equipment for present-day pasteurizing, cooling, and cheesemaking. Professor Martin Mortensen, who was the head of the Dairy Industry department, assisted with the portrayal of dairy technology. Professor Maurice Hanson of the landscape architecture department designed the gravel walkways and plantings in the courtyard.

The PWPA in Iowa was directed by the regionalist painter Grant Wood. Petersen was the only sculptor in the Iowa program. He became the sculptor-in-residence at the university, and his art is found mainly in Iowa. The sculptures themselves are rare examples of federally subsidized art on a Midwestern college campus. PWPA sculptures are generally found in large cities on both the east and west coasts.

== See also ==
- Iowa State University Buildings
