= Campanella =

Campanella (plural campanelle) is Italian for 'little bell', and may refer to:

- Campanella (surname)
- Campanella (fungus), a genus in family Marasmiaceae
- The third movement of Violin Concerto No. 2 by Paganini
- La Campanella, a piano étude by Franz Liszt
- A song by Kenshi Yonezu from Stray Sheep
- A trilogy of games developed by the fictional company UFO Soft in the 2024 video game compilation UFO 50

== See also ==
- Campanelle, a type of pasta shaped like a small bell or flower
- Campanile (disambiguation)
- Campanula, a genus of plant in family Campanulaceae
- Roy Campanella, an American baseball player
- Campanella is one of two main characters in Kenji Miyazawa's novel, Night on the Galactic Railroad
- Shukufuku no Campanella, a visual novel by Windmill
- Wednesday Campanella, a Japanese music group
