= Memorial Union (Iowa State University) =

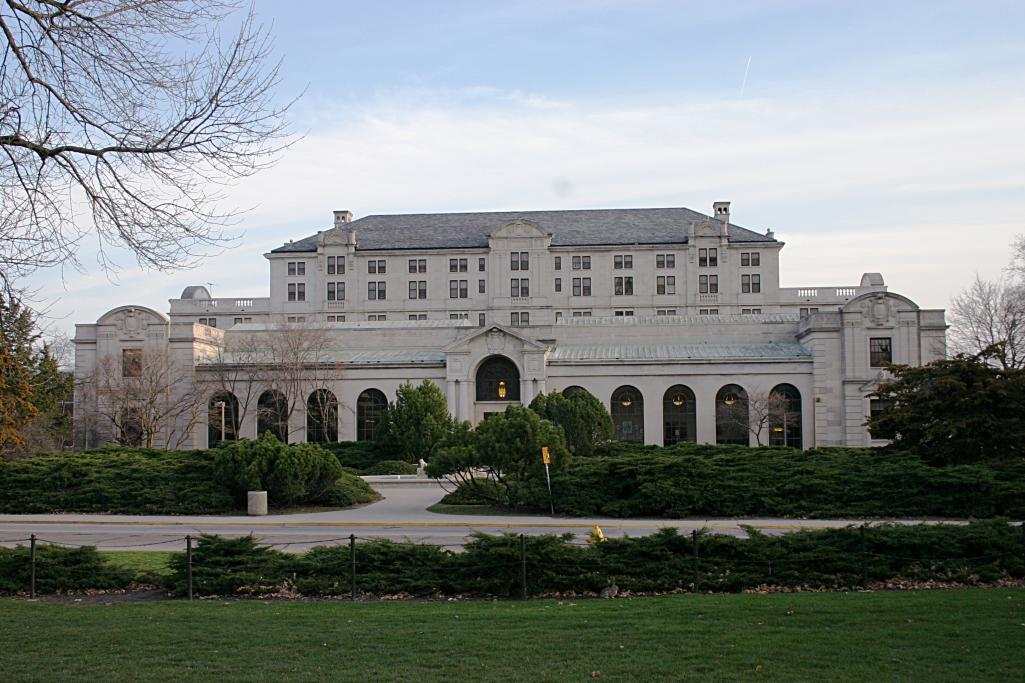
- Memorial Union

General information
- Type: Student Union and War Memorial
- Location: 2229 Lincoln Way; Ames, Iowa 50011
- Current tenants: Iowa State University
- Construction started: 1927
- Completed: 1928 (Original Section)
- Owner: Iowa State University

The Memorial Union, or MU, at Iowa State University opened in September 1928, the building is currently home to a number of University departments, a bowling alley, the University Book Store, student organizations, and weddings.

== History ==
The concept of a memorial to the Iowa Staters who had died in World War I was developed soon after the end of the war itself in 1918. After many ideas were proposed, a bronze plaque, a grotto, or a gateway arch, a group of students rallied for a living memorial, "a building that would provide service to the college and preserve the memory of those that were lost." In June 1920, students, faculty, and alumni, finally reached a decision and a campaign was started to raise the funds for the building. In 1922, the Memorial Union Board, which had been formed to oversee the campaign for the Memorial Union was incorporated under Iowa law.

From 1923 to April 1925, lengthy discussions were held regarding the choices for the building's location. Among the sites considered were the current sites of Friley Hall and Music Hall. Ultimately, the present location, previously home to the "Sanitary Building" and the early facilities of the College of Veterinary Medicine, was dedicated on April 22, 1925.

In 1926, the Des Moines, Iowa architecture firm, Proudfoot Rawson & Souers, was contracted and a basic design by William T. Proudfoot was accepted by the Memorial Union Board. The original design shows the north face of the building much as it looks today, however it was not completed until 1965. By April 1927, the Memorial Union Board had raised enough pledges to begin construction on the building and ground was broken.

On September 23, 1928, the first cafeteria line was opened. The next day, Memorial Union and Alumni Association administrators occupied their offices. The 1928 building consisted of the main five-story section, including the Great Hall, its adjacent east and west areas, and the Gold Star Hall to the north. Until 1936-37, the upper two floors were left unfinished.

By 1938, the demand for more space in the Memorial Union prompted an addition to the south of the building. This addition created the South Ballroom, the Pine Room, the original bowling alley in the basement, and expanded the existing Commons. The next addition in 1948, again extended south, allowing for eight additional bowling lanes, the first section of the terraces, and improved food service areas on the first floor. In June 1950, work began again, this time on the northwest corner of the building. This area included the west terraces, the areas currently known as the Pride Lounge and the New Student Programs office, and the Chapel and Browsing library. The Sun Room and old Bookstore areas were added in 1957-58.

The northeast corner, while part of the original design, was added in 1964-65, creating the Campanile Room, the Cardinal Room, and the former Regency Room (currently a ladies restroom), the East Student Office Space, and the Pioneer Room. In 1972, increased demands on the food service areas and the bookstore led to a southeast expansion. This addition included new mechanical offices and expanded kitchen and bookstore storage and sales areas as well as a new service dock with improved truck access. The southeast wing was completed in 1978-79, with the addition of two more floors. On the first floor, the Gold Room was added as an additional dining location and office spaces were constructed on the second floor.

In 2003, the Memorial Union Board was dissolved and ownership of the Memorial Union was transferred to the University.

== Gold Star Hall ==
The memorial envisioned by the students of Iowa State is embodied in the limestone walls and stained glass windows of the Gold Star Hall. Located at the north entrance of the Memorial Union, the hall is named after a military tradition started in World War I. When a family had a son or daughter in service, they hung Service Flags or cards with a blue star for each child in their window. When a serviceman or woman's life was lost, the star was changed to gold.

The Gold Star Hall opened in 1928, carved on the walls were the names of Iowa Staters who had died in World War I. The researcher's work was so carefully done, that no errors have ever been reported. Since that time, names have been added for those who have been killed in World War II, the Korean War, the Vietnam War, Somalia, and Iraq.

Above the north door to the hall, a quotation by the poet John Drinkwater is carved:

For Thee they died
Master and Maker, God of Right
The Soldier dead are at Thy gate
Who kept the spears of honor bright
And Freedom's house inviolate.

In the vestibule, the following dedication is inscribed: A memorial to the six thousand Iowa State College men and women who offered their lives during the World War in the cause of human liberty and free government.

=== Stained Glass Windows ===
Although the Gold Star Hall opened its doors in 1928, the final piece of the original design was not installed until 1943. Twelve stained glass windows were planned, but due to lack of funds, clear glass was installed in 1928. In March 1942, a committee was appointed to ensure the installation of the stained glass windows. The committee drafted up the concept for the windows and chose the artist, Harold W. Cummings.

Cummings, a member of the Iowa State Class of 1918 and World War I Veteran, took over the work of the committee and designed the windows from their concept. In addition to the design, Cummings oversaw construction and installation of the windows.

==== Symbolism ====
Each window is designed around one of twelve "homely virtues" for each window-Learning, Virility, Courage, Patriotism, Justice, Faith, Determination, Love, Obedience, Loyalty, Integrity, and Tolerance. The main themes are evidenced in the center panel medallions (A, B, and C) of each window. The border panels (D, E, and F) depict figures and scenes which can be broken into four groups, first are emblems of several branches of the armed forces, second are emblems suggesting majors at Iowa State, third are historical scenes or traditions of Iowa State, fourth are suggestive of religious symbols.

The top semicircular panel of each window depicts one of three emblems, the Dove of Peace, the American Eagle, and the Iowa State Campanile. Each window is topped by a Gold Star.

== Traditions ==
=== Zodiac and Fountain of the Four Seasons ===
In his original designs for the Memorial Union, W.T. Proudfoot incorporated the symbols of the Zodiac into the north entrance floor. The plans called for the bronze symbols to be raised from the surface of the floor. Proudfoot's intended that as each visitor to the Memorial Union walked over the symbols, they would be worn down until they were even with the floor's surface, therefore each visitor would be able to leave their mark on the Memorial Union.

Unfortunately for W.T. Proudfoot, by 1929, the students had decided that stepping on the Zodiac would mean failing their next test. This "curse" has led students to walk around the bronze symbols ever since.

Luckily for students, in 1937, the cure to the "curse" was donated by the VEISHEA Committee. The curse says that any student who steps on the Zodiac can cure the curse by throwing a coin into the Fountain of the Four Seasons, located on the north side of the Memorial Union. In 1942, sculptor Christian Petersen added four sculptures to the fountain, each a figure of a woman representing one of the seasons, Spring-east-planting corn, Summer-south-sheltering a young plant, Autumn-west-holding the harvest, and Winter-north-nursing a child.

=== Browsing Library and Chapel ===
Located, symbolically, directly below the Gold Star Hall, the Browsing Library and Chapel were constructed in 1959 from W.T. Proudfoot's original design. The location symbolizes Proudfoot's belief that patriotism and democracy are supported by "religious conviction and a recorded history of dedication to those principles, a culture and a literature of concern for those high ideals."

=== Engraved Quotations ===
In addition to the quotations engraved within the Gold Star Hall, the west entrance of the Memorial Union features a number of other quotations. Over the door to the north of the west entrance vestibule is a quotation by M.J. Riggs, Iowa State Class of 1883, and first president of the Memorial Union Board.

We come to college not alone to prepare to make a living, but to learn to live a life.
M.J. Riggs, '83

Other Quotations in the West Entrance:

To set the cause above renown,
To love the game beyond the prize.''
Sir H.J. Newbolt

If a man does not make new acquaintances as he advances through life, he will soon find himself alone.
A man, sir, should keep his friendships in constant repair.''
Samuel Johnson

== Architecture ==
The original building was designed by architect, William T. Proudfoot. The building employs a classical style of architecture reflecting Greek and Roman influences. The building's design specifically complements the designs of the major buildings surrounding the University's Central Campus area, Beardshear Hall to the west, Curtiss Hall to the east, and MacKay Hall to the north. The style utilizes columns with Corinthian capitals, Paladian windows, triangular pediments, and formally balanced facades.
