= Iowa State Daily =

Newspaper in Ames, Iowa

- Type: Student newspaper
- Format: Tabloid
- School: Iowa State University
- Owner: Iowa State Daily Media Group
- Editor-in-chief: Cleo Westin
- Managing editor: Sarah Currier
- Founded: 1890
- Headquarters: 2420 Lincoln Way; Ames, IA 50014; United States
- Circulation: 5,038 daily
- Website: iowastatedaily.com

The Iowa State Daily is an independent student newspaper serving Iowa State University in Ames, Iowa, that is published online. It was founded in 1890, and is largely funded by advertising revenues. The Iowa State University Student Government helps pay for its distribution on campus.

The paper was published five days a week during the fall and winter semesters. In 2017, the Daily moved from publishing in print once a week during the summer to solely digital content. The Daily's printed circulation was 5,038.

Lawrence Cunningham was hired in July 2014 as the general manager, overseeing the organization's advertising department. Following Laura Widmer's resignation as the organization's CEO in November 2014, the Iowa State Daily Publication Board named Cunningham as her replacement in December 2014. Mark Witherspoon has served as the student newspaper's editorial adviser since 1999. Beginning in the fall of 2006, he became a full-time adviser.

== History ==
In the spring of 1890, The I.A.C. Student was founded by a group of students led by F.E. Davidson at the Iowa Agricultural College. It was done without any support from the college or officials. The publication led the way for the Iowa Agricultural College Student, which formally launched on August 7, 1890. It was printed at Ames Intelligencer.

The first issue stated:

We shall try to publish a "college newspaper". The Iowa Agricultural College is our field and we shall endeavor to advance the institute in every manner possible. We shall not attempt to run scientific or literary magazine, and we doubt if there is a demand for our ideas on politics and religion. It is our object to create a genuine college newspaper, one free from all alliances, and in this work we invite all the friends of the institute to help us."

Seven issues later, the Student wrote:

"Notwithstanding the prophesies of unfriendly critics, The Student has grown and prospered. We have endeavored to make it truly a students' newspaper - a record of what they think and how they act."

The Iowa Agricultural College Student was a bi-weekly newspaper until 1894, when it began publishing on a weekly basis at the cost of about 5 to 10 cents per issue.

In March 1897, the I.A.C. Student was formally renamed The Student as it went from 8 pages to around 16 pages per issue. In 1900, The Student began publication twice a week. Two years later the newspaper was renamed yet again, this time to The Iowa State Student. It was about this time that the first courses in journalism were offered at Iowa State. In fall of 1905, a course in agricultural journalism was added to the course catalog. Home Economic students received a journalism course in 1911. Engineering journalism was added in 1920. The Department of Technical Journalism was created in 1927.

During the newspaper's first 25 years it began to make a transition from personal and editorial-based stories to more news stories such as the assassination of President William McKinley, the fire that burnt down the Old Main Building, and the death of the college's former president William M. Beardshear. Most of the news stories were positive reports on the school's developments. Critical stories were rare but The Student did run a few. Sports coverage was another important coverage area. Baseball and football had been essentials at I.A.C for years, but basketball also became a popular sport, even though it took a while for the college to pick up on its popularity.

On September 14, 1914, the newspaper undertook the task of publishing three days a week. The Student also accepted some suggestions by then university president Raymond Pearson. An editorial board made up of a couple faculty and about half a dozen students would have complete control over the editorial and business aspect of each issue. The paper would also be very cautious of printing anything to critical as to protect the reader. The newspaper's size also declined during this period to only about four pages by 1918 because of the war.

In 1924, the Student united with Iowa Agriculturalist, Iowa Homemaker, and Iowa Engineer to create the Collegiate Press (later called the Iowa State University Press). The Collegiate Press and the college agreed to establish it as a nonprofit corporation and the College set aside the east basement of Agricultural Hall for printing. The acquiring of a Model A Duplex Press in 1926, allowed for morning publication.

During the 1920s and 1930s The Iowa State Student focused on everything at Iowa State and left state, national and even city headlines out. The construction of the Memorial Union, the addition of new bells at the Campanile, the first VEISHEA celebrations, and the shocking death of football player Jack Trice were heavily covered.

In March 1938, The Iowa State Student began publishing five times a week and was renamed The Iowa State Daily Student.

An agreement between the college and the Collegiate Press resulted in the building of Collegiate Press Building. The building was renamed to "Press Building" in 1956, and to its current name of "Hamilton Hall" in 1984, after Carl Hamilton, who served for three years as head of the Department of Technical Journalism as well as two years in university relations, and 17 years as vice president for information and development. Hamilton also served as editor of The Iowa State Student from 1934 to 1935.

During World War II, The Iowa State Daily Student was forced to reduce the size from eight pages to four pages. By 1942, nearly every story and advertisement was linked to the campus's war effort and included sections "War Detail" and "Iowa State Men in the Services."

Women were also largely covered during this time, with a section entitled "Women in Society." This was because most of Iowa State's men had gone to fight in the war.

After the war, the newspaper began to publish stories for a wider audience, and not just for the students of Iowa State. On June 8, 1947, The Iowa State Daily Student was renamed The Iowa State Daily. Then editor Lee Schwanz observed that the generation on campus was made up of people who had been in the war and been to Europe and the Pacific, so he made a move toward covering more international, national, state, and local news.

In the Spring 2017 semester, the Daily began publishing an e-newsletter to all 36,000 plus students at the university.

Beginning in the Fall 2017 semester, the Daily began printing on tabloid-sized print. The decision was made as a way to save money over the more expensive broadsheet that had been used previously.

As of the summer of 2020, the Daily has stopped publishing a print product due to the COVID-19 pandemic. The Daily has since been operating exclusively digitally.

== Awards ==
The Daily has won numerous awards:

- 2 Associated Collegiate Press Newspaper Pacemakers: in 2019 and 2011, and as a finalist in 2018, 2017, 2016, 2013, 2009, 2006, 2002 and 2001
- 2 ACP Online Pacemakers: in 2011 and 2006, and as a finalist in 2016 and 2009
- 2 Society of Professional Journalists' Marks of Excellence for "Best All-Around Daily Student Newspaper" in 2015 and 2007, and as a finalist in 2017
- An SPJ Mark of Excellence for "Editorial Cartooning" in 2005
- As a finalist for SPJ's Mark of Excellence for "Feature Writing" in 2015 (Emily Barske, “Our Way of Life”)
- As a finalist for SPJ's Mark of Excellence for "Best Affiliated Website" in 2011
- As a finalist for SPJ's Mark of Excellence for "Sports Photography" in 2010 (Kelsey Kremer, “Cyclone Stampede: Kickin’ Up Dust”)
- As a finalist for SPJ's Mark of Excellence for "General Column Writing" in 2009 (Jessica Opoien)
- As a finalist for SPJ's Mark of Excellence for "Photo Illustration" in 2008 (Dan McClanahan, “Logging out for good”)
- As a finalist for SPJ's Mark of Excellence for "Sports Writing" in 2005 (Ricky Rud, “Keeping a brotherhood on track”)
- 12 gold crowns from the Columbia Scholastic Press Association:
  - 5 in Hybrid News: 2020, 2019, 2018, 2015, 2013 (Fall 2011, Spring 2012)
  - 3 in Digital News: 2012, 2011, 2010
  - 4 in College Newspaper: 2008 (Spring '07), 2006 (Spring ‘05), 2005 (Spring '04) and 2004 (Spring ’03)
- 10 silver crowns from the Columbia Scholastic Press Association:
  - 5 in Hybrid News: 2026, 2021, 2017, 2016, 2014
  - 4 in College Newspaper: 2012 (Fall '10, Spring '11), 2009 (Fall '07, Spring '08), 2008 (Fall '06) and 2004
  - 1 in Digital Newspaper: 2009
