= Enrollment Services Center =

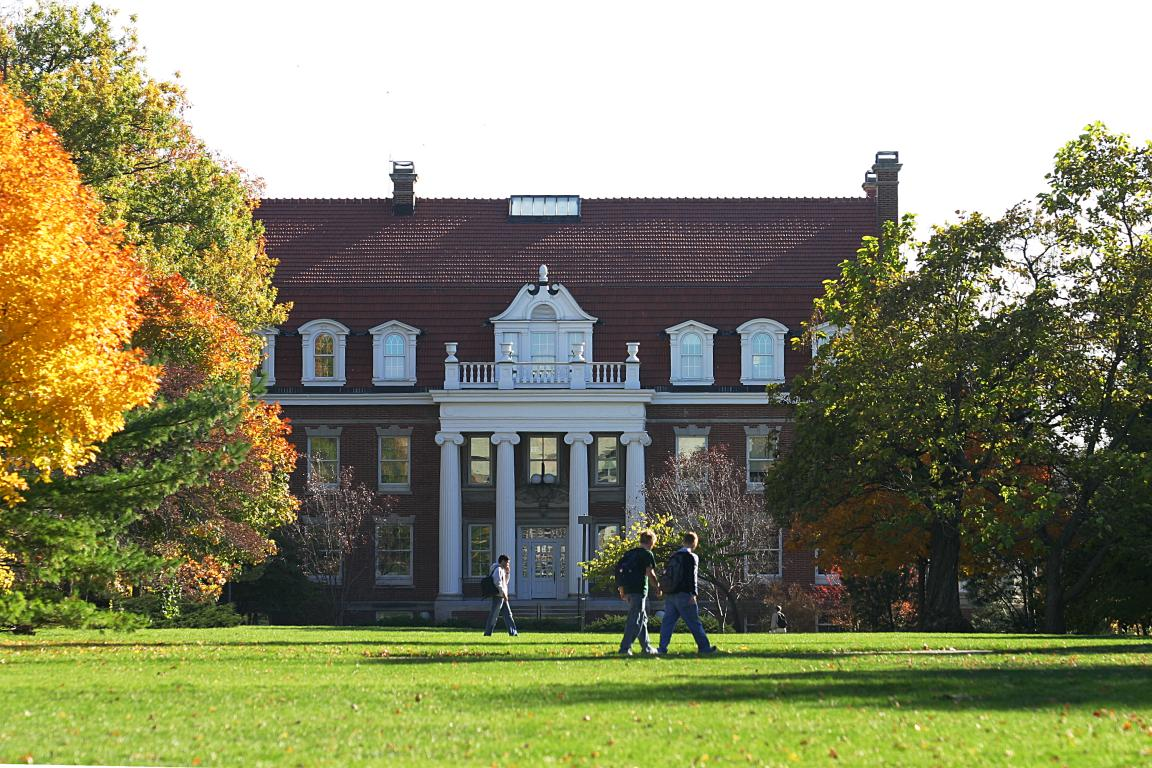
- Enrollment Service Center on fall afternoon
- Interactive map of the Enrollment Services Center area

General information
- Architectural style: Colonial Revival, Georgian Revival
- Location: Union Dr., Iowa State University; Ames, Iowa
- Coordinates: 42°1′30″N 93°38′56″W
- Current tenants: Admissions, Registrar
- Construction started: 1904
- Completed: 1907
- Owner: Iowa State University
- Landlord: Iowa State University

Design and construction
- Architect: Proudfoot & Bird
- Alumni Hall
- U.S. National Register of Historic Places
- Area: less than one acre
- NRHP reference No.: 78001260
- Added to NRHP: November 16, 1978

The Enrollment Services Center is a building at Iowa State University in Ames, Iowa. It houses the Office of Admissions and the Office of the Registrar. In 1978, the building was placed on the National Register of Historic Places.

== History ==
Construction was started in 1904 after years of planning and fundraising, however, was halted in 1905 when funds ran out. After sitting uncompleted for two years, Laverne Noyes agreed to fund the cost to complete the building with the a few conditions:

- the building be named "Alumni Hall"
- the Alumni Association gets office space and the use of the building once a year
- the building be open to all students on campus.

Until 1914, the building housed the campus' only swimming pool and in 1917 it was used as an infirmary for the flu epidemic. The building also had a cafe (known as "College Inn") and bowling alley. Between 1927 and 1937, remodeling added more student rooms, games rooms, study rooms and offices were also added when the College Inn was closed because of the construction of the Memorial Union. The Alumni Association also relocated to the Memorial Union and the Alumni Hall was used as an administration building for the Naval Training School during World War II. After the Navy moved out in 1944, the building continued to house the YMCA, YWCA, and served as dormitories.

In 1966, the building was placed on the National Register of Historic Places. In 1986, the Iowa Board of Regents granted ISU approval to acquire the building from the Alumni Hall Corporation Board of Directors and in 1987, the last residents moved out and a $2.1 million historic remodeling was undertaken.

In 2008, the building was renamed from Alumni Hall to Enrollment Services Center to avoid confusion with the new Alumni Center. The building now houses the Office of Admissions and the Office of the Registrar.

== Gallery ==
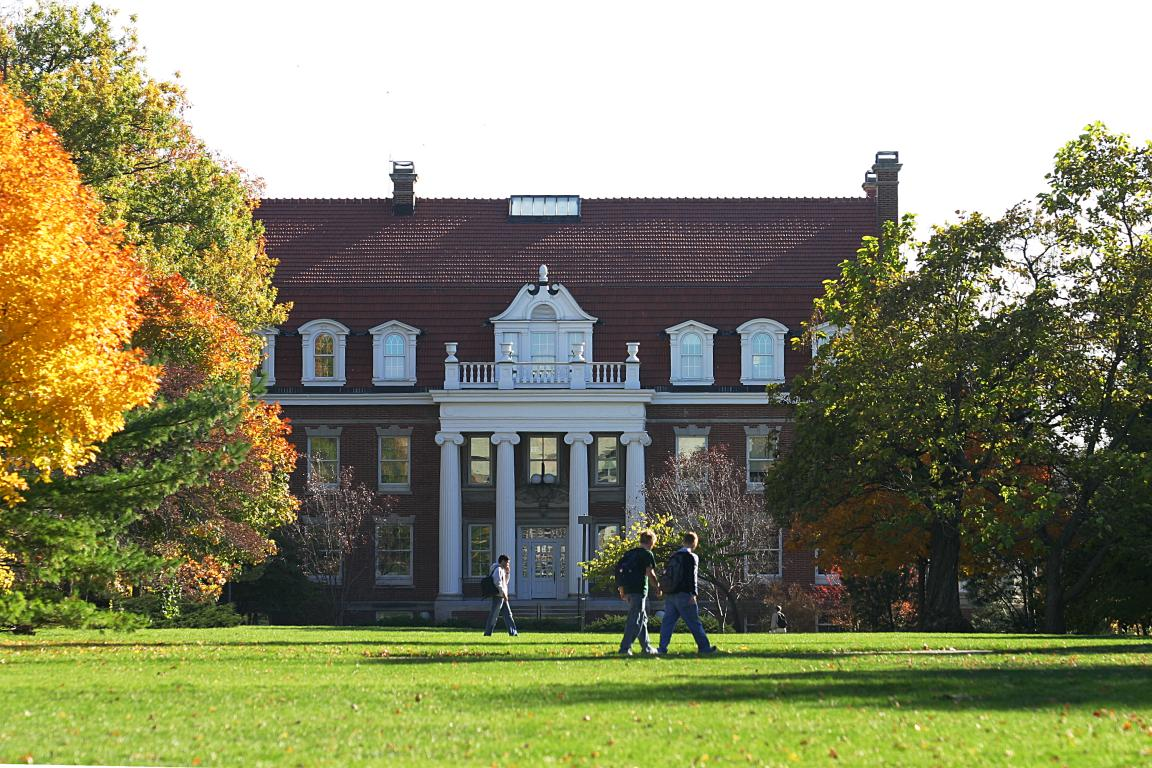
Enrollment Services Center on fall afternoon

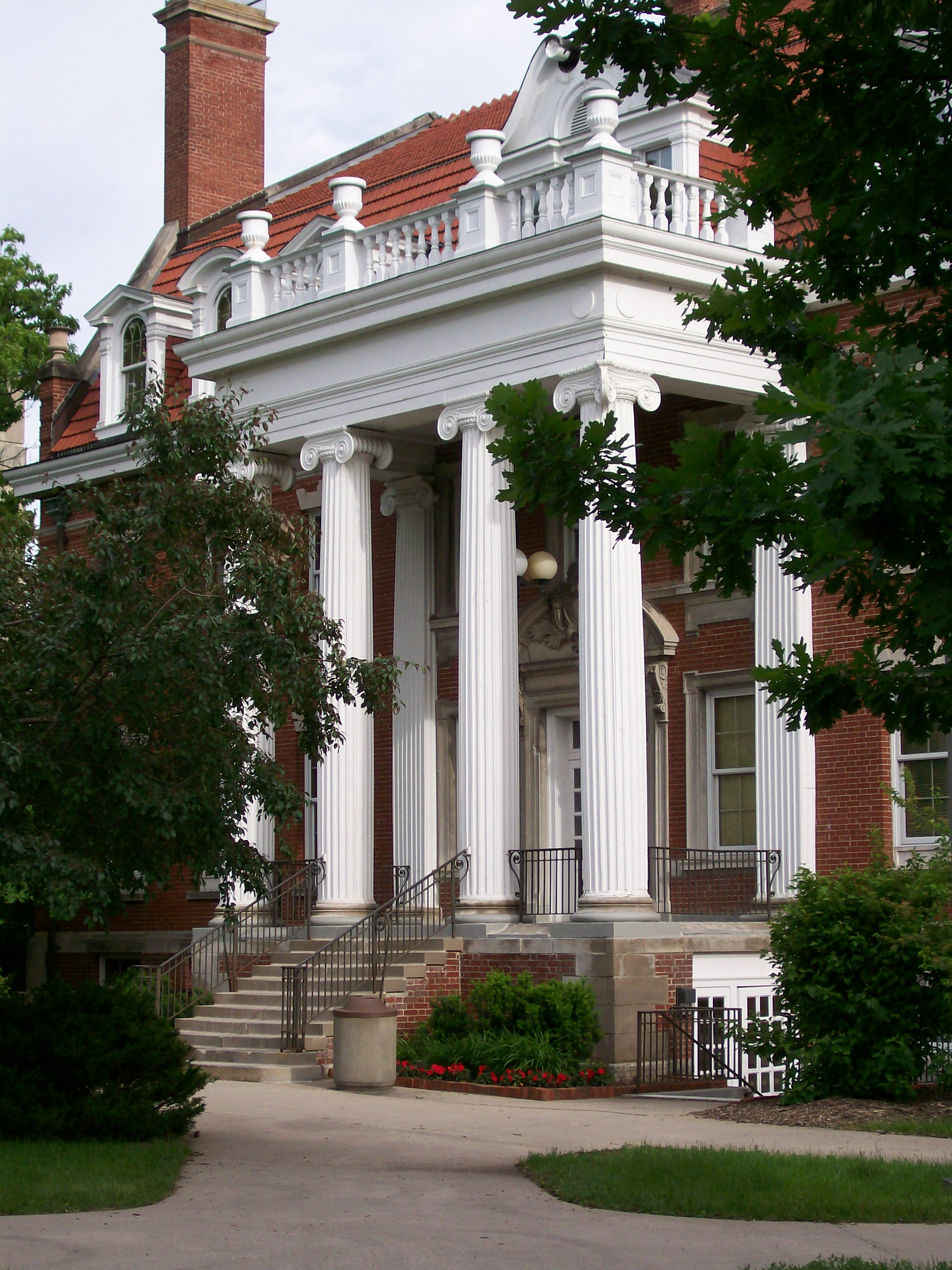
Enrollment Services Center
