= Charles Durham =

Charles Durham may refer to:

- Charles Durham (Neighbours), a character from the soap opera Neighbours
- Chuck Durham (1918–2008), American civil engineer, philanthropist and civic leader
