= Campanile (disambiguation) =

A campanile is a bell tower.

Campanile may also refer to:

== Structures ==
- Campanile (Iowa State University), Ames, Iowa, United States
- Campanile, Portmeirion, Wales
- Campanile (Trinity College Dublin), Ireland
- Sather Tower or The Campanile, University of California, Berkeley, United States
- Leaning Tower of Pisa, Pisa, Italy
- St Mark's Campanile, Venice, Italy
- The Campanile (New York City), US

== Enterprises and brands ==
- Campanile (restaurant), former restaurant in Los Angeles, California, United States
- Campanile, a brand of the Louvre Hôtels chain

== Nature ==
- Campanile (gastropod), a genus of large sea snails
- Bombino bianco or campanile, a grape variety

== Publications ==
- The Campanile, the student newspaper of Mount Saint Joseph Academy in Pennsylvania, United States
- The Campanile, the student newspaper of Palo Alto High School, California, United States
- The Campanile, the yearbook of Rice University, Houston, Texas, United States

== Other uses ==
- Campanile (cake), a traditional Corsican Easter cake
- Campanile (surname)
- Campanile probe, used in near-field scanning optical microscopy
