= Campanale =

Campanale is a surname. Notable people with the surname include:

- David J. Campanale (born 1952), retired US Air Force Chief Master Sergeant
- Kate Campanale (born c. 1986), American politician
- Matt Campanale (born 1988), American ice hockey player

== See also ==
- Campanile (surname), another surname
