= Morrill Hall (Iowa State University) =

- U.S. National Register of Historic Places
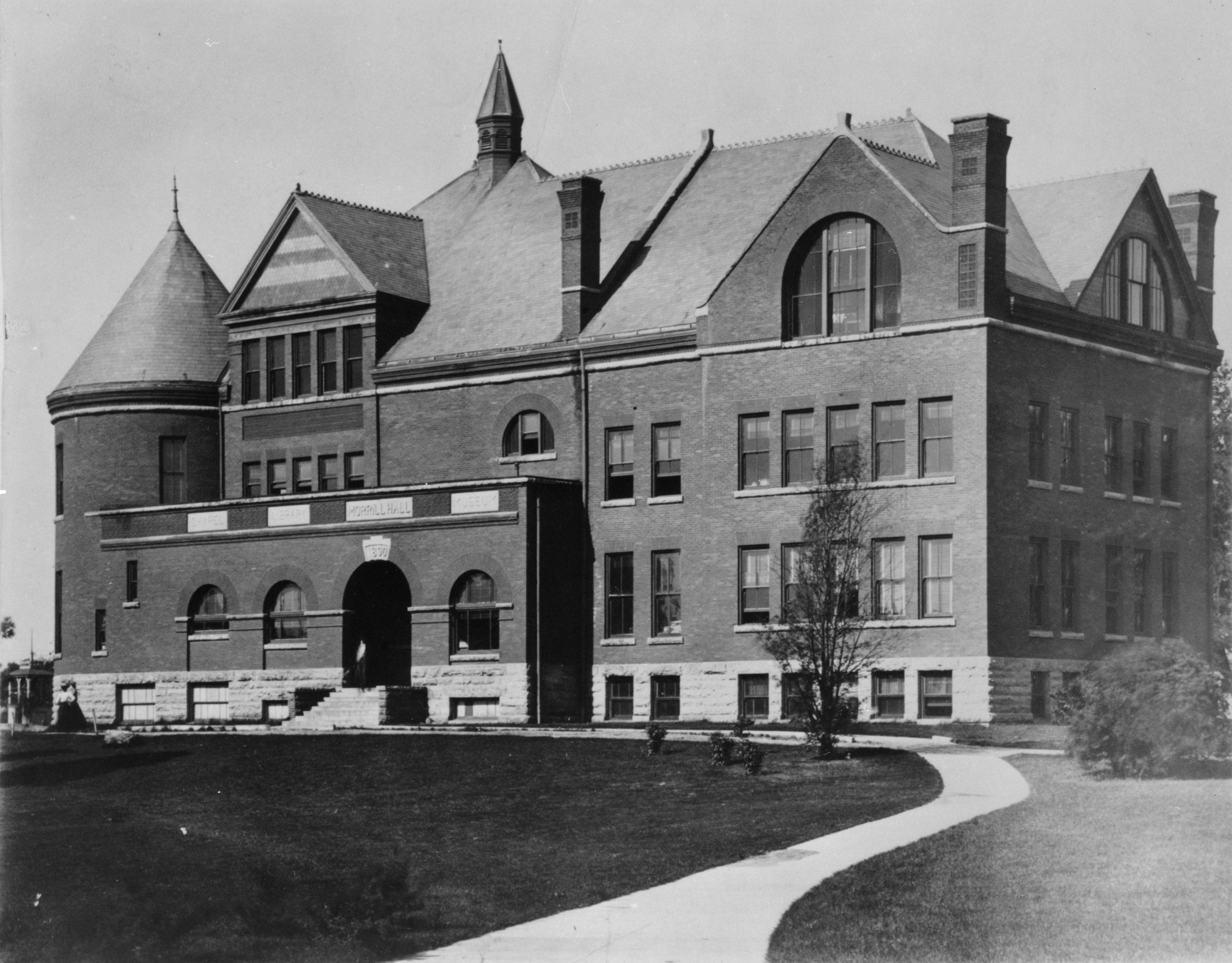
- HABS photo

- Location within Iowa Location within the United States
- Location: Morrill Rd., facing E toward central campus, Iowa St. University, Ames, Iowa
- Coordinates: 42°1′38″N 93°38′52″W
- Area: less than one acre
- Built: 1891
- Built by: King, O.J.
- Architect: Josselyn & Taylor
- Architectural style: Romanesque
- NRHP reference No.: 96000700
- Added to NRHP: June 28, 1996

Morrill Hall, on the campus of Iowa State University, is a historic building that now houses the Christian Petersen Art Museum.

It was named for Justin Smith Morrill, who created the Morrill Land-Grant Colleges Act. Construction was completed in 1891 with less than $30,000. Morrill Hall was originally constructed to fill the capacity of a library, museum, and chapel. These original uses are engraved in the exterior stonework on the east side.

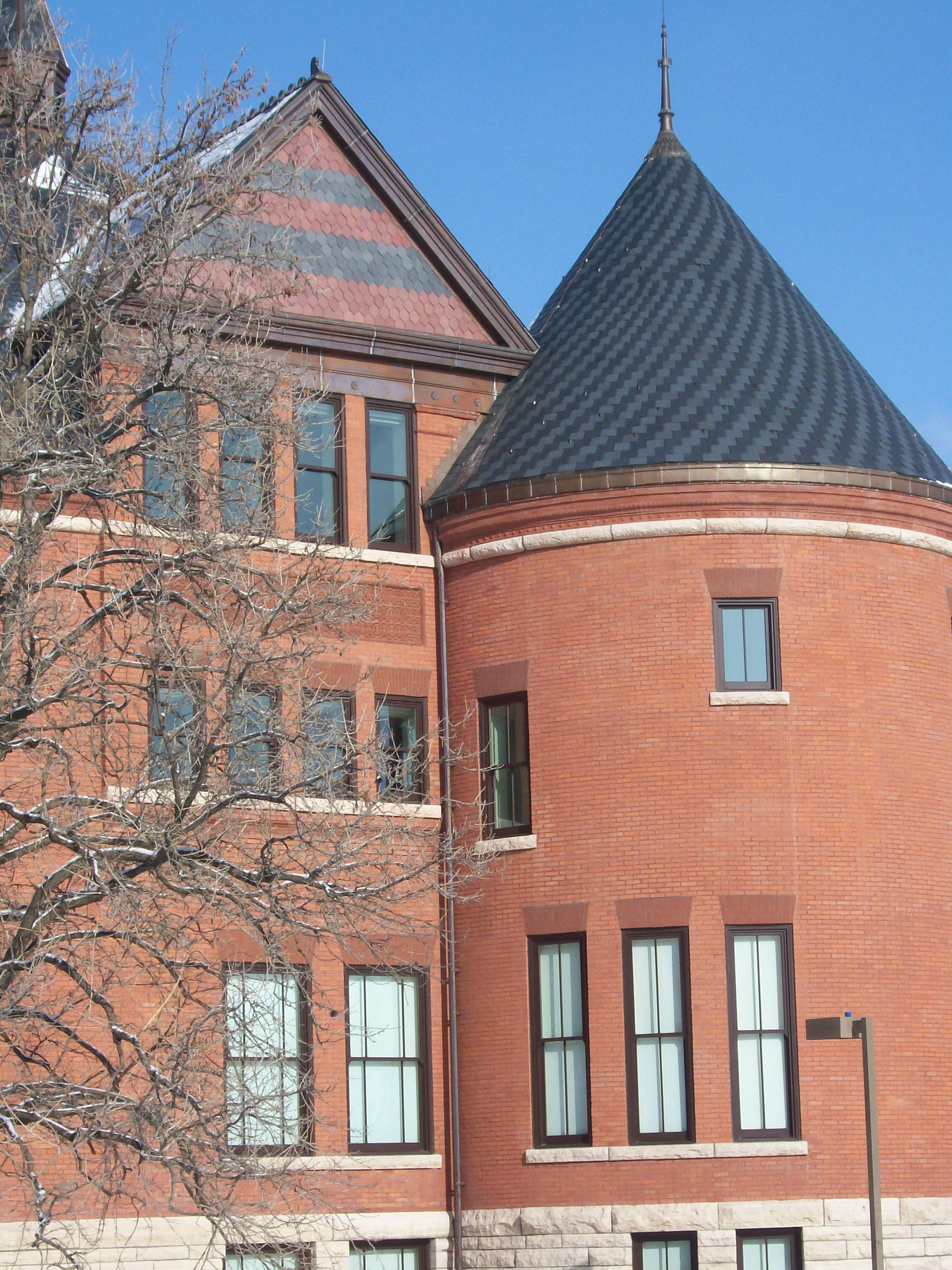
Morrill Hall in 2008

It was vacated starting in 1996 when it was determined unsafe. Also in 1996, Morrill Hall was listed on the National Register of Historic Places. In 2005, $9 million was raised to renovate the building and convert it into a museum. Morrill Hall has reopened as of March 2007, including the new Christian Petersen Art Museum.

The building has 27,172 square feet.

Chimneys at the four corners are designed to provide draft for natural ventilation, unlike most chimneys (which exhaust products of burning).

== See also ==
- Campus of Iowa State University#Current buildings
- Morrill Hall, Cornell University
- Morrill Hall, University of Nevada, Reno
