= Iowa State University College of Veterinary Medicine =

Veterinary college in Ames, Iowa, US

Coordinates: 42.006830°N 93.632440°W

- Established: 1879
- Parent institution: Iowa State University
- Dean: Dan Grooms
- Location: Ames, Iowa
- Colors: Cardinal and Gold
- Website: vetmed.iastate.edu

Iowa State University's College of Veterinary Medicine was established in 1879, and is the oldest veterinary college in the United States. Iowa State has graduated 6,400 veterinarians and is one of the largest veterinary research facilities in the nation.

== History ==
Officially formed in 1879, Iowa State College of Veterinary Medicine can trace its history back to the school's founding in 1858, when state legislator's specified that veterinary studies would be included in the subjects of instruction. Seniors of ISU's first graduating class in 1872, received instruction in veterinary science, but it was not until 1879 that degrees were offered in that subject. The ISU veterinary school was the first state veterinary college in the United States. Other private veterinary colleges all closed by the 1920s, leaving ISU as the oldest veterinary college still in operation in the United States.

Originally, the degree programs offered were only two-year programs, but with expanded coursework, the program was extended to three years in 1887 and to four years by 1903 (making Iowa State the nation’s first four-year veterinary school).

In 1885, veterinary classes were held in the "Sanitary Building," which was located where the current ISU Memorial Union now stands. In 1893 the veterinary department was moved to the "Old Agricultural Hall" or "Botany Hall", today known as Catt Hall.

By 1912, overcrowding became an issue. With state appropriation, the "Vet Quadrangle" (currently known as Lagomarcino Hall) was built on the north side of campus. The Quadrangle consisted of four buildings connected by corridors arranged around the central courtyard. A fifth building was than constructed further north and the Veterinary Diagnostic Laboratory was completed in 1956.

As the college continued to grow, the faculty became dissatisfied with the old name for the college, the "Division of Veterinary Medicine". In a 1933 report, the Dean of Veterinary Medicine, Charles Henry Stange commented:

the advisability of changing the Division of Veterinary Medicine to "College of Veterinary Medicine" has been discussed for years ... Apparently we have a "College of Veterinary Medicine" at Iowa State in fact but not in name ... It is our earnest hope that this correction be made at an early date.

To rename the college, it required making the other divisions within Iowa State college into separate colleges also. On July 4, 1959, the change was finally made and since the "Division of Veterinary Medicine" is now called the "College of Veterinary Medicine."

The Quadrangle was the veterinary school's primarily buildings for 64 years until overcrowding once again became an issue. Plans were developed for a new facility on a tract of land adjacent to the Veterinary Medical Research Institute just north of Highway 30. The new facility was completed in 1976 at a cost of just over $25 million. Dedication ceremonies were held in the fall in which President Gerald Ford, among other state and national dignitaries, attended.

== Facilities ==
Built in 1976, VET MED is the largest academic building at Iowa State University, with over 347,000 square-feet. A new veterinary medical center (completed 2008), built onto the south-east side of the building, adds another 218,000 square feet (20,300 m^{2}) onto a massive veterinary medical center & teaching facility. Although it only has two floors, ISU VET MED building has more square-footage than the second tallest building in the state, the 35 floor Ruan Center in Des Moines.
