= Chuck Durham =

American engineer

Charles W. Durham (1918 – April 5, 2008) was a civil engineer, built-environment pioneer, noted philanthropist, and civic leader in Nebraska and Iowa.

== College life ==
Durham earned three degrees from Iowa State University in Ames, Iowa (G.E. '39; C.E. '40; PD '45) before moving to Omaha, Nebraska to join his college sweetheart, the former Margre Henningson, and beginning his professional life as an engineer with Henningson Engineering Company.

While a student at Iowa State, Durham was a member of the Iowa Gamma chapter of Phi Delta Theta fraternity. He was initiated as Bond 274

Durham was a student under John Vincent Atanasoff, who along with his graduate assistant Clifford Berry, invented the world's first electronic digital computer.

== Professional life ==
Durham began work at Henningson Engineering Company for Margre Henningson's father, Henning Henry Henningson, in 1940. Within ten years the company officially changed its name to Henningson, Durham, and Richardson, Inc or HDR, Inc., under Durham's leadership. Durham grew the firm from 15 employees to 1,700 before retiring.

Durham also founded and ran the firm Durham Resources until his death in 2008

== Philanthropic and Civic Achievements ==
Iowa State University Distinguished Alumni Award 1992

Director of the Panama Canal Co.

Director the U.S. Chamber of Commerce

President and Director of Chief Executives Organization

President and National Director of the Nebraska Society of Professional Engineers

Board Chairman of the Mid-America Council of Boy Scouts of America

== Named Donations ==
Iowa State University

The Charles W. Durham and Marge Henningson Durham Center for Computation and Communication

Durham Great Hall, Iowa State Memorial Union

H.H. Henningson Plaza (next to Howe Hall) donated by Durham in honor of his father-in-law

Durham Visualization Laboratory

University of Nebraska Omaha

Durham Science Center

Charles W. Durham School of Architectural Engineering and Construction

Charles W. and Margre H. Durham Distinguished Professor of Information Science and Technology

University of Nebraska Medical Center

Durham Research Center & Durham Research Plaza

Durham Research Center II

The Durham Museum

== Notes & External Links ==
All references retrieved on May 9, 2008 unless otherwise noted.
