= William Miller Beardshear =

American school administrator (1850–1902)

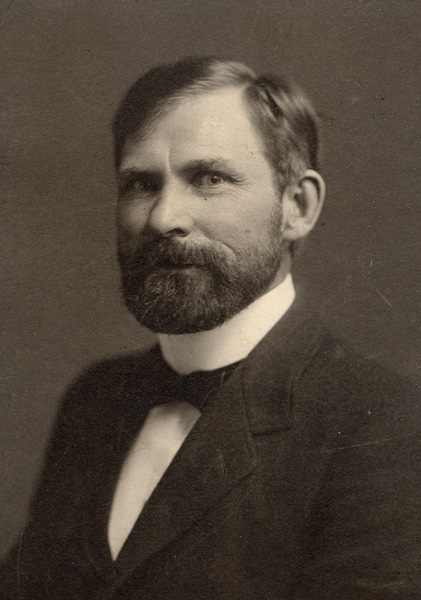
- Born: November 7, 1850 near Dayton, Ohio, US
- Died: August 5, 1902 (aged 51)
- Occupations: Superintendent; university president

William Miller Beardshear (November 7, 1850 – August 5, 1902) was an American pastor and academic administrator who served as the President of Western College, later becoming President of Iowa State University from February 25, 1891, until his death. He was also the Superintendent of public schools in West Des Moines, Iowa. Iowa State University's Central Building became Beardshear Hall in 1938 and he was known as the "father of Iowa State College".

== Personal life ==
Beardshear was born on a farm outside of Dayton, Ohio, on November 7, 1850, to John and Elizabeth (Coleman) Beardshear. His parents held United Brethren religious services at their home. After receiving an education at Ohio public schools, Beardshear enlisted in the Union Army when he was 14 years old as part of the Fourth Army Corps in the Army of the Cumberland, serving until the American Civil War ended. After leaving the military, he began attending Otterbein University when he was 19 years old in 1869. Beardshear married student Josephine Mundhenk during his time at Otterbein University, on March 27, 1873. Beardshear did not graduate with a Bachelor of Arts from the university until June 1876 due to him having to manage the family farm after his father died of an illness. Beardshear died on August 5, 1902, after complications from a heart attack. He was survived by his wife and their five children.

== Career ==
Beardshear became a United Brethren pastor in Arcanum and Dayton, Ohio in 1876, later being educated at Yale Divinity School in 1878. During his time at Yale, Beardshear felt overworked and took a break at his family farm near Dayton. He became a pastor at the Summit Street Church of the United Brethren in Dayton, leading to him being asked to become the President of Western College in Toledo, Iowa, in 1881.

After serving as Western College President for eight years, Beardshear was hired as Superintendent of West Des Moines, Iowa schools. Beardshear became President of the Iowa Agricultural College, now known as Iowa State University, on February 25, 1891. During Beardshear's 11-year tenure as President, the number of students increased from 336 to 1,220, and the professors increased from 25 to 78. He added new agriculture programs to the university, along with the buildings Morrill Hall in 1891, the Campanile in 1899, Old Botany in 1892, and Margaret Hall in 1895. Beardshear often preached at the chapel at night. In 1891, he began the foundation of officially sanctioning athletic college teams. A gymnasium and an athletic field were built at the university, and the university's football team became known as the Iowa State Cyclones in 1895.

== Legacy ==
Iowa State University's Central Building became Beardshear Hall in 1938. The Biographical Dictionary of Iowa said that Beardshear was known as the "father of Iowa State College".
