= Campanella (surname) =

Campanella is an Italian surname. Notable people with the surname include:

- Alyssa Campanella, Miss USA 2011
- Bruno Campanella (1943–2026), Italian conductor
- Frank Campanella (1919–2006), U.S. actor
- Joseph Campanella (1927–2018), U.S. actor
- Juan J. Campanella (born 1959), Argentine film director
- Michele Campanella (born 1947), Italian pianist and conductor
- Rob Campanella, U.S. musician (The Quarter After)
- Roy Campanella (1921–1993), U.S. baseball player
- Tommaso Campanella (1568–1639), Italian philosopher, theologian and poet
