= Campanile (surname) =

Campanile is an Italian surname. Notable people with the surname include:

- Achille Campanile (1899–1977), Italian writer, playwright, journalist and television critic
- Anthony Campanile (born 1982), American football coach
- Giovanni Agostino Campanile (died 1594), Roman Catholic prelate, Bishop of Minori (1567–1594)
- Pasquale Festa Campanile (1927–1986), Italian screenwriter, film director and novelist
- Raffaele Festa Campanile (born 1961), Italian television author, screenwriter, film director and music producer

== See also ==
- Campanale, another surname
