= Black Engineering Building =

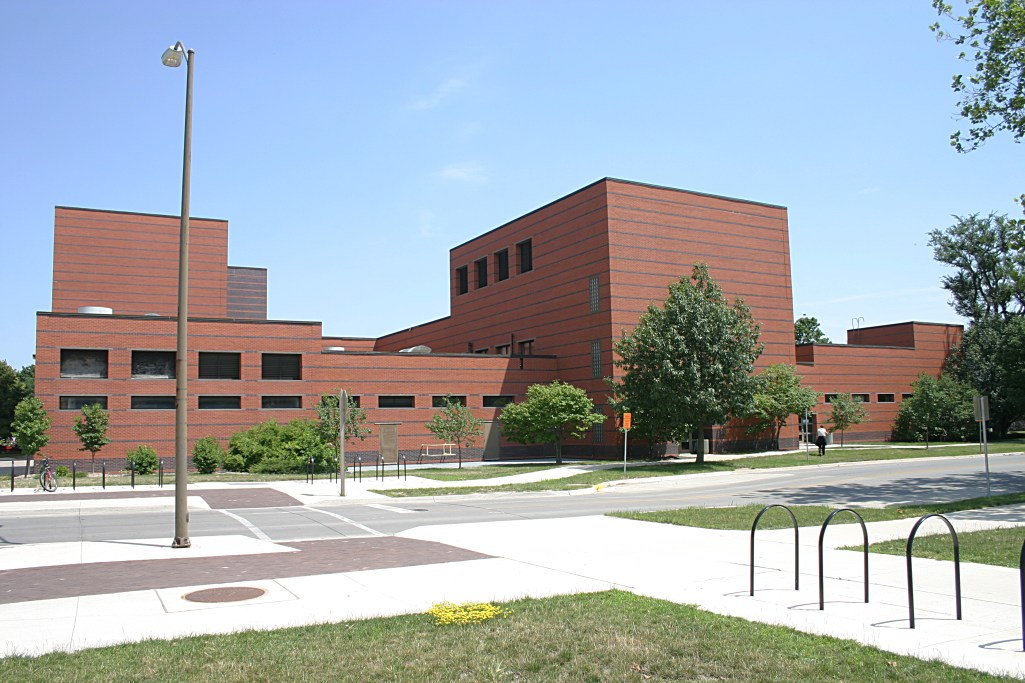
- West side of building

- Location within Iowa

General information
- Location: Ames, Iowa, United States
- Coordinates: 42°1′34.0314″N 93°39′5.3994″W
- Current tenants: Department of Mechanical Engineering, Department of Industrial and Manufacturing Systems Engineering
- Completed: 1985
- Owner: Iowa State University

Technical details
- Floor area: 117,941 sq ft (10,957.1 m^{2})

The Black Engineering Building is a research and teaching facility at Iowa State University that contains the mechanical engineering and industrial engineering departments. The first phase of the building was opened in 1985 for instructional purposes, and additions were completed in 1987. The building is named to honor Henry M. Black, the long-time member of the Iowa State faculty who served as professor and head of the mechanical engineering department from 1946 to 1972.

The facility houses department administration, faculty, teaching classrooms, and research laboratories to support:

- Computational fluid dynamics
- Biorenewable fuels and combustion engines
- Laser-based flow diagnostics
- Human-computer interaction and virtual reality; Multimodal Experience Testbed and Laboratory (METaL)
- Bio microfluidic and optofluidic systems
- Multiphase flow visualization using x-rays
- Operations and production systems computing
- Industrial design
- CNC machining, welding, polymer processing, metal casting, and metrology

The grounds of the building also house a campus art sculpture titled "Carom" by Bruce White.

== Gallery ==
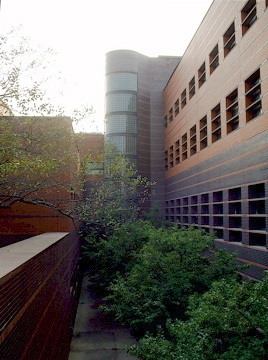
Courtyard
