= Beardshear Hall =

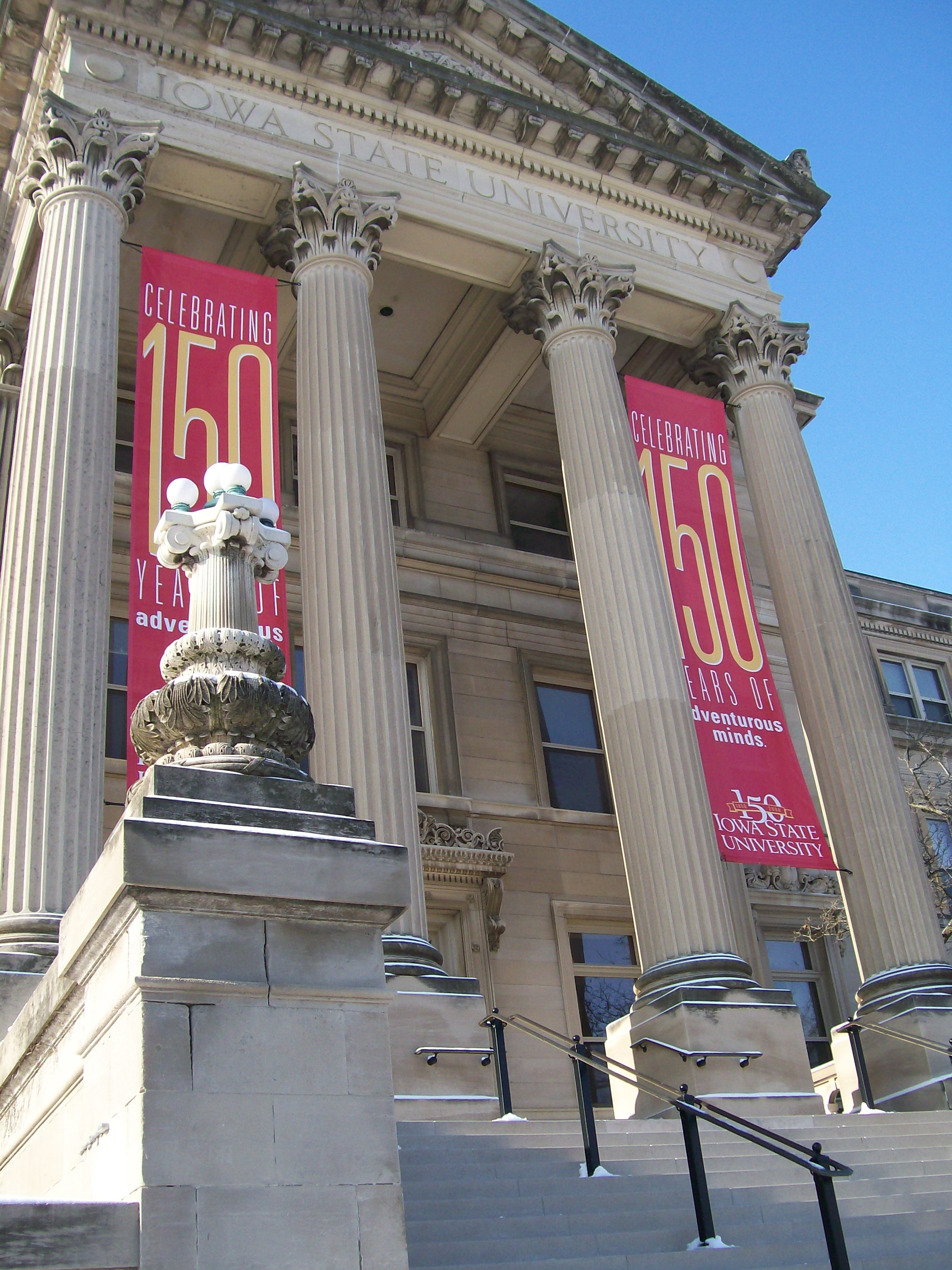
- Beardshear Hall Sesquicentennial Celebration
- Interactive map of the Beardshear Hall area

General information
- Architectural style: Neoclassical, Beaux Arts
- Location: Ames, Iowa
- Current tenants: Iowa State University Administration
- Completed: 1906
- Owner: Iowa State University

Technical details
- Floor count: 4
- Floor area: 104,209

Design and construction
- Architects: Proudfoot & Bird Architects

Beardshear Hall is an administration building at Iowa State University located on Morrill Road. The building was designed by Proudfoot & Bird Architects and constructed in 1906. Today, Beardshear Hall holds the following offices:

- President
- Vice-President
- Treasurer
- Secretary
- Student financial aid
- Provost

== History ==
When a fire destroyed the "Old Main" building in 1902, it was determined that a new administration building was needed and the location of Old Main was the best location. As a result of the fire to Old Main, fireproofing the new building was a high priority. Fireproof buff Bedford stones were used extensively in the construction of the new Central Building. Massive scagliola columns were used in the interior, columns so like marble that even experts were deceived. The building materials were so fireproof that only the hardwood furniture was capable of burning.

The Central Building originally housed the Office of the President, the Departments of English, Mathematics, Botany, History, Modern Languages, and Elocution, the Office of the Secretary and Treasurer, and the Office of the Board of Trustees. In 1938 the building was renamed Beardshear Hall, after William Miller Beardshear, the president of the institution during the planning and construction stages of Central Building. By the mid 1970s all classes in Beardshear Hall had been relocated to other buildings on campus, leaving the Office of the President and the Office of the Provost, and the Office of the Vice President for Business as the most prominent offices in the building. Other offices directly impacting student life still located in Beardshear Hall include the Office of Student Financial Aid and the Office of the Vice President for Student Affairs.
