= Alumni Center (Iowa State University) =

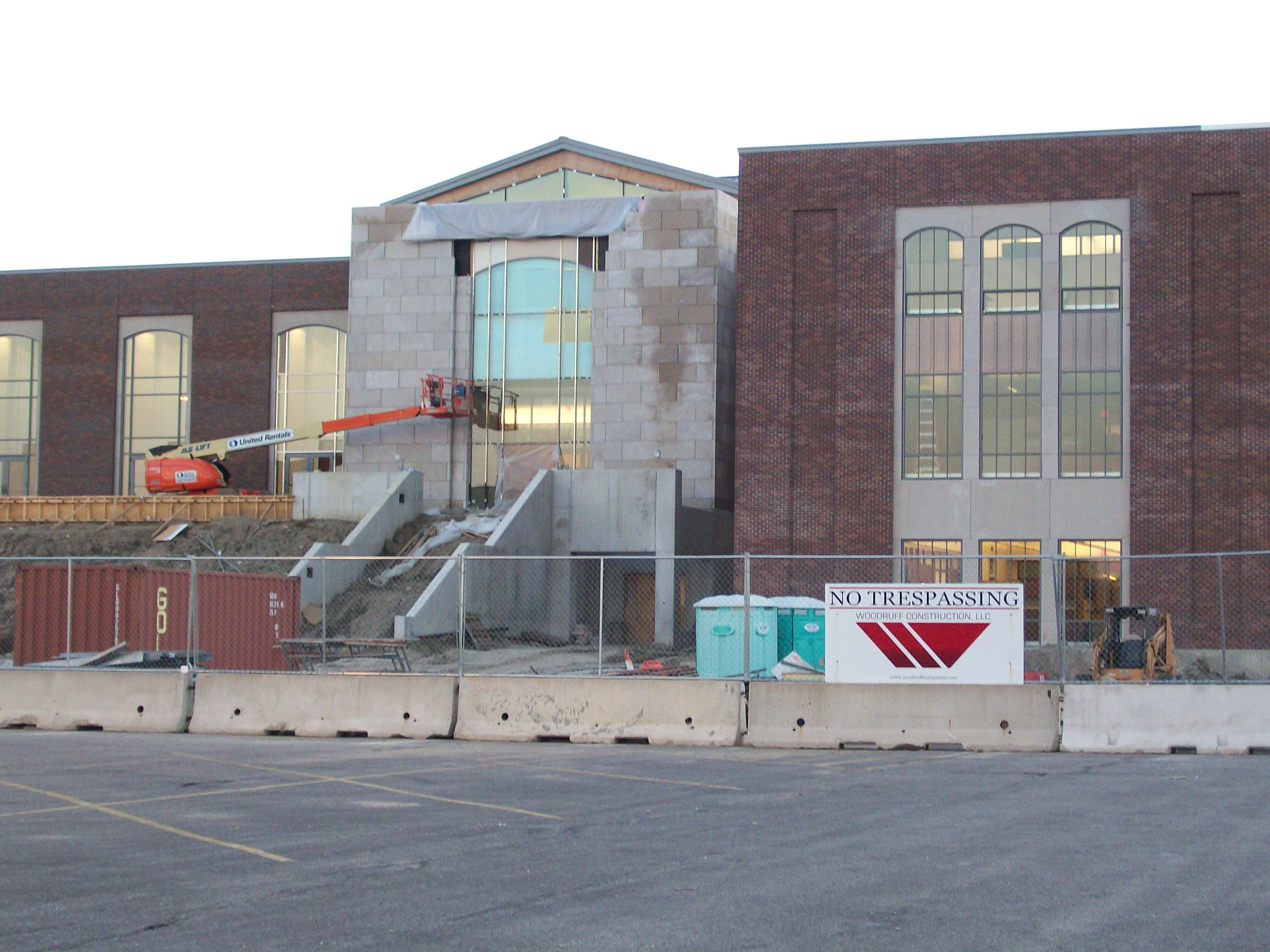
- Alumni Center under construction- June 2008

General information
- Location: 429 Alumni Lane; Ames, IA 50010
- Current tenants: Iowa State University Alumni Association
- Construction started: 2006
- Completed: August 2008
- Owner: Iowa State University
- Landlord: Iowa State University

The ISU Alumni Center (completed fall 2008) is a $11.2 million, 34,500-square-foot (3,210 m^{2}) facility, built to house the Iowa State University's Alumni Association and Student Alumni Leadership Council. Built near the Iowa State Center in Ames, Iowa, the Alumni Center serves as an enhancement to student life, alumni homecomings, and community and alumni engagement.

The center was built using solely donations to the Alumni Association with Roy & Bobbi Reiman donating $9 million toward the building's construction. On the east side of the building sits a statue of Iowa State University's mascot Cy'. It was designed by Michael D'Ambrosi and is the only sculpture of the school's mascot on campus.

The building, which was in the plans for over 30 years, was architecturally designed to resemble parts of Iowa State University campus. The building is part of Iowa State's "Live Green!" campaign and uses geothermal for heating and cooling. It is the only building at Iowa State that uses geothermal.
