= Campanile (Iowa State University) =

Bell tower in Iowa, United States

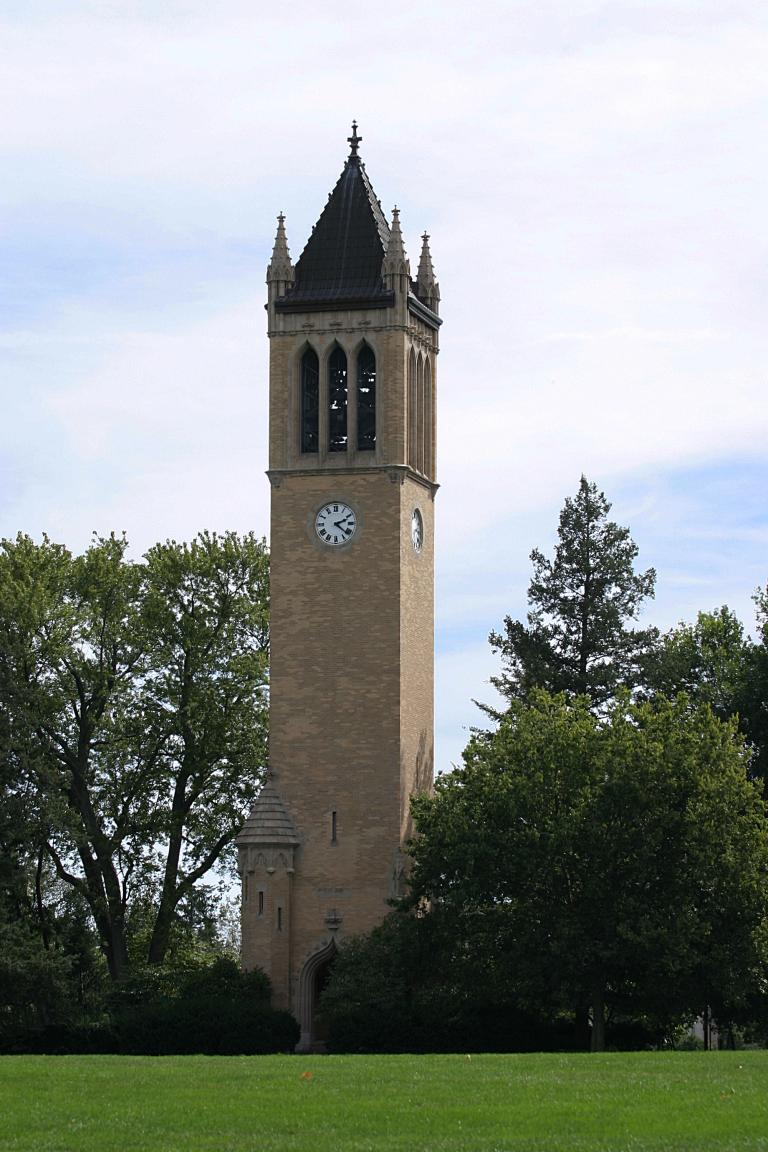
- The Campanile as seen from the north-west.
- Interactive map of the Campanile area

General information
- Type: Carillon and Memorial
- Location: Central Campus
- Coordinates: 42.0255°N 93.6460°W
- Current tenants: Stanton Memorial Carillon (since 1899)
- Construction started: 1897
- Completed: 1898 (Original Section)
- Owner: Iowa State University

The Iowa State University Campanile is located on the university's central campus, and is home to the Stanton Memorial Carillon. The campanile is widely seen as one of the major symbols of Iowa State University. It is featured prominently on the university's official ring and the university's mace, and is also the subject of the university's alma mater ("The Bells of Iowa State").

== History ==
The campanile was constructed in 1897 as a memorial to Margaret MacDonald Stanton, Iowa State's first dean of women, who died on July 25, 1895. The tower is located on ISU's central campus, just north of the Memorial Union. The site was selected by Margaret's husband, Edgar W. Stanton, with the help of then-university president William M. Beardshear. The campanile stands 110 feet (34 m) tall on a 16 by 16 foot (5 by 5 m) base, and cost $6,510.20 to construct.

In 1899, Edgar Stanton donated the carillon's first ten bells in memory of his late wife. Each of the original bells is inscribed with a different quotation selected by Edgar Stanton. After Edgar died in 1920, the bulk of his estate was given to the university. In 1929, a portion of this money was used to purchase an additional 26 bells that were added to the carillon in Edgar's memory. In 1956, an additional 13 bells were purchased by the Stanton Memorial Trust. One final bell was added in 1967 to bring the carillon up to a total of 50 bells. The bells and their supports at the top of the campanile weigh nearly 30 short tons (27 t), with the heaviest bell at 5,737 lb (2,602 kg). The carillon sounds every quarter-hour (playing "Westminster Quarters") and can be heard from most of campus.

In 1991, budget cuts at Iowa State and the Music Department was not able to fund a replacement for the carillon position following the retirement of Professor Richard von Grabow. As a result, the bells remained silent until September 19, when Kenn McCloud, morning disk jockey and operations manager for KCCQ-FM in Ames, locked himself inside the Campanile with intentions to stay inside until $10,000 was raised—enough to pay a guest carillonneur to play. By September 24, Ames residents, students, faculty and alumni had donated $10,700 to the "Bucks for Bells" campaign and McCloud emerged. The next morning, two ISU Alumni, Jean and Michael Steffenson, offered a leadership gift for the Campanile renovation.

On November 18, 1991, ISU Alumnus Thomas Sutherland was released from captivity in Lebanon after over six years. At one of the first press conferences following his release, Sutherland was quoted as saying,

"I was very, very moved when I heard on Voice of America a recording of the bells of Iowa State, which I particularly appreciated hearing when I was a student there on campus," Sutherland said. "So when I heard them ring out 72 bells on the occasion of my seventy-second month (in captivity), I was extremely happy. So to Iowa State, I would say, 'Keep the bells ringing.'"

On December 5, an ISU Alumnus read Sutherland's comments in The New York Times and pledged half of the remaining $175,000 needed to reach the $350,000 goal for the Campanile renovation and issued a challenge to alumni to complete the goal.

In a December 1991, letter to President Jischke, an anonymous donor expressed hope that the Campanile would never again reach a point of serious deterioration. The donor contributed $1 million to permanently endow the Campanile and assure that funding would be available for future upkeep.

By the summer of 1992, the challenge had been met by over 2,700 alumni and friends and construction began.

Between 1992 and 1994, the campanile underwent renovations with major gifts from:

- Classes of 1940, 1942, & 1987
- The Stanton Memorial Carillon Foundation
- Bobbi and Roy Reiman
- Jean and Michael Steffenson
- Esther and Harold Wilcke

Also in 1994, two ISU alumni, Charles and Ivadelle Cownie, donated $250,000 to Iowa State's music department in order to establish an endowed carillon professorship within the department. The current Cownie Professor of Music (and the fifth carillonneur in ISU history) is Tin-Shi Tam. ISU holds a 20-minute carillon concert every weekday at 11:50 a.m. and at other special occasions. The concert is usually performed by Dr. Tam, though students and others do occasionally perform.

=== Keep the Bells Ringing renovations ===
In 1992, renovations began on the nearly 100-year-old Campanile. The tower itself received restoration to the brick and terra cotta exterior, improvements to the bell chamber arches, new clock movements and a digital control system for coordinating the clock and chimes. This work was completed by Reitz Engineering. The carillon renovations were completed by the I.T. Verdin Company and included, a redesigned framing for the bells to hang from, repositioning the bells, new clappers, new playing console, and a new practice console. The practice console is housed in Room 47, Music Hall. The playing cabin was renovated by Walker Metzger Architects and included, wood paneling for the walls, and a ceiling treatment. Carpet, air conditioning and heating were also added to the cabin area.

== Tradition ==
Campanile folklore states that an ISU student is not a "true Iowa Stater" until having been kissed underneath the Campanile at the stroke of midnight. This rite of passage lives on during "Mass Campaniling" at Homecoming, VEISHEA, or other occasions, during which time hundreds or even thousands of students gather near the campanile to continue this tradition.

== Gallery ==
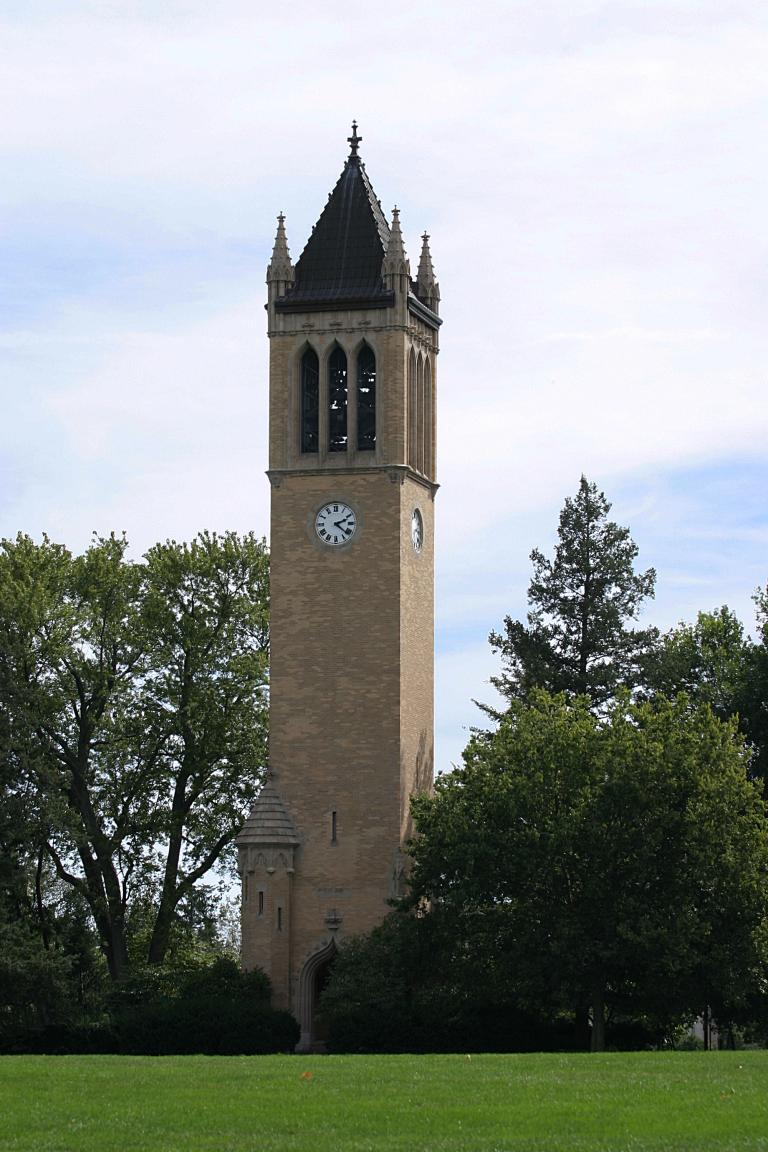
The campanile as seen from the north\north-west

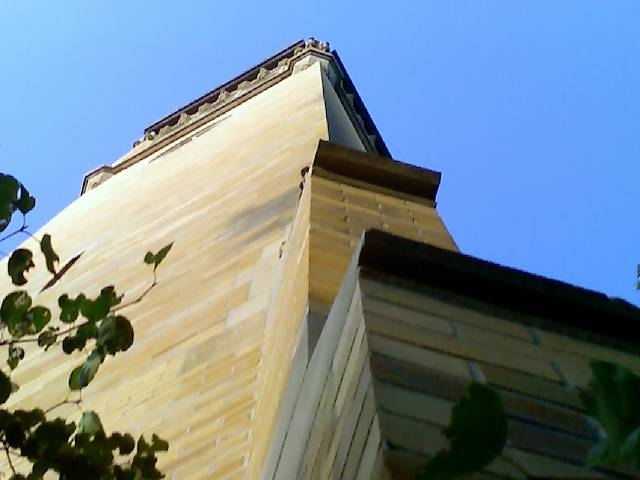
The campanile as seen from the SW, looking up

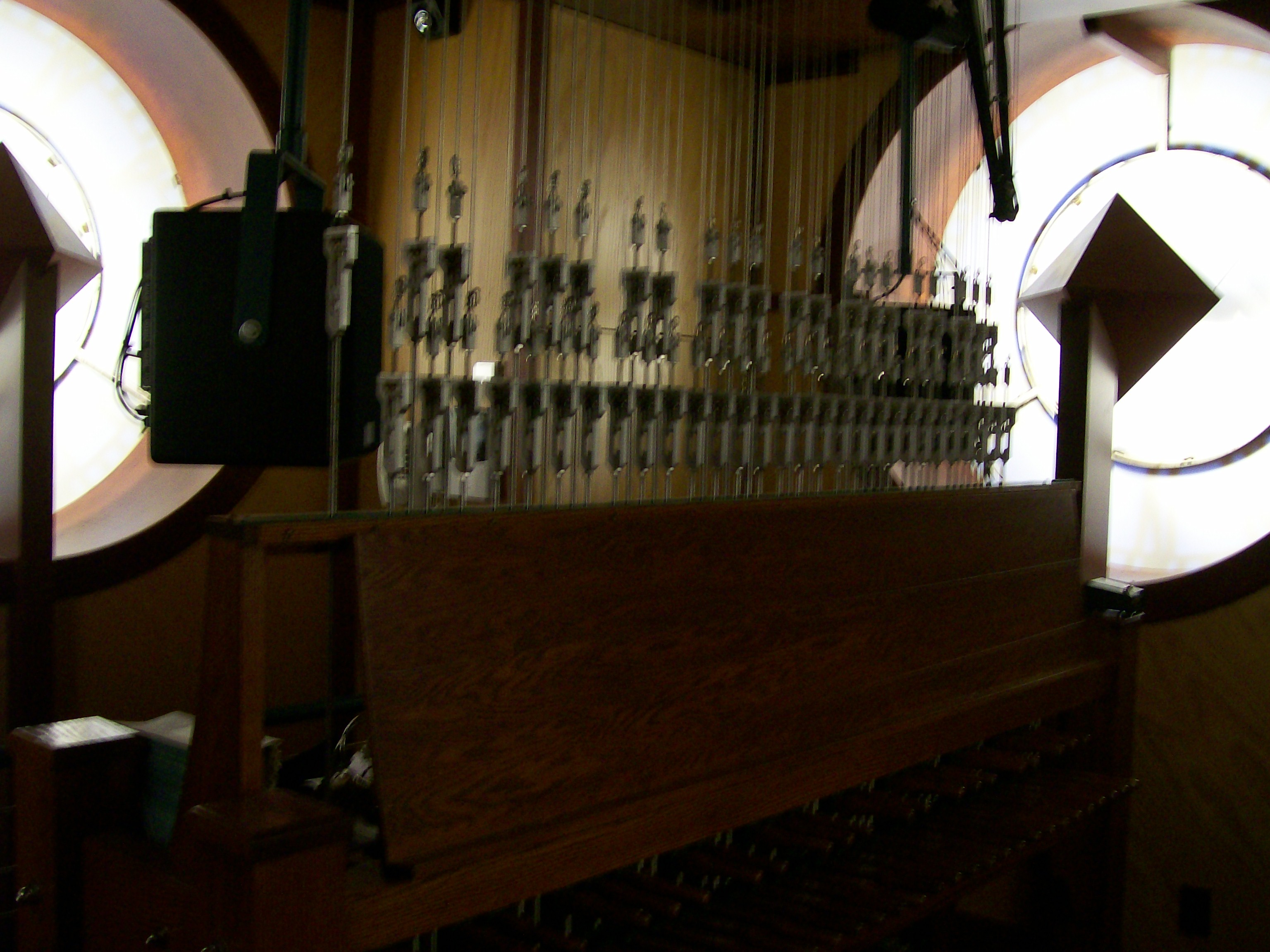
Inside the ISU campanile
