= Christian Petersen (sculptor) =

American sculptor

Christian Petersen (25 February 1885 – 4 April 1961) was a Danish-born American sculptor and university teacher. He was the first permanent artist in residence at a U.S. college or university, and he is noted for the large body of sculpture associated with a single place, Iowa State College, now Iowa State University.

Petersen's sculpture is predominantly Neoclassical and beaux arts in style, and he virulently denounced modernism. He especially admired Augustus Saint-Gaudens' reliefs and war memorials. But he also included some gestures toward modernism in his relief sculptures, perhaps under the influence of Grant Wood. His large-scale sculpture has been the object of numerous restoration projects at Iowa State University, to preserve his public art legacy. Other of his works are collected in the Christian Petersen Museum, in the restored Morrill Building on the campus.

== Personal life ==
Christian Petersen was born on 25 February 1885 in Dybbol, Denmark. He emigrated to the United States in 1894 with his parents, Peter and Helene Lorensen Petersen. The initially settled near Paxton, Illinois, before moving to Newark, New Jersey.

He was married to Emma L. Hoenicke from 1908 to 1928, with whom he had three children, Helene Petersen Male (1909–2000), Lawrence (1912–1981), and Ruth Eleanor Sollenberger (1915–1987). He married Charlotte Garvey (died 1985), a secretary for Dodge and Ascher, in 1931. Their daughter, Mary Charlotte, was born 24 November 1936.

In 1949, Petersen converted to Catholicism at the age of 64. In the late 1940s and early 1950s, he created a number of religious works of art, many of which were commissioned by churches and schools in Iowa. He suffered a heart attack in 1959. Christian Petersen died on 4 April 1961 of cancer at Mary Greeley Hospital in Ames.

== Career ==
In 1900, he became an apprentice die cutter and later attended the Fawcett School of Design and the Rhode Island School of Design in 1905. He joined the Art Students League of New York at the age of 22, and studied with leading artists there, including Henry Hudson Kitson and George Bridgman. He worked as a die cutter at the Robbins Company in Attleboro, Massachusetts, and continued to sculpt, gaining commissions for works in the East and Midwest through Kitson's connections.

In 1917, his sculpture, Josiah Everett Draper, accepted at annual exhibition of the Pennsylvania Academy of Fine Arts. The first known critical notice on his sculpture appeared in an article in the Boston Transcript in 1918. The following year, he was commissioned to create his first known public sculpture, the Nurses Memorial, for the city of Attleboro. By 1920, Petersen maintained a studio in Boston and had become associated with other sculptors in the city, namely Henry Hudson Kitson and Theo Alice Ruggles Kitson.

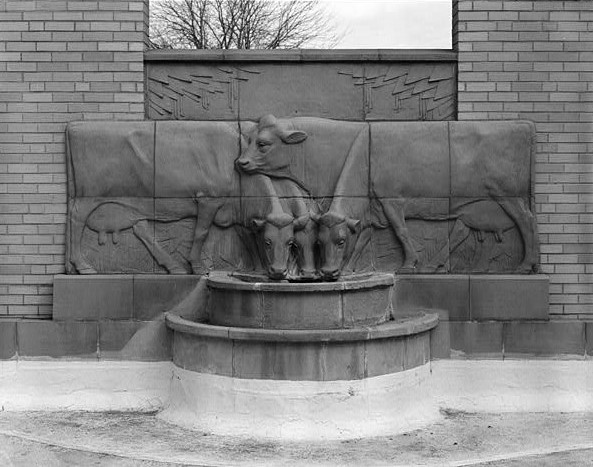
The fountain on the east side of the Dairy Industry Building's courtyard at Iowa State. One of nine terracotta sculpture panels in Petersen's History of Dairying, 1935.

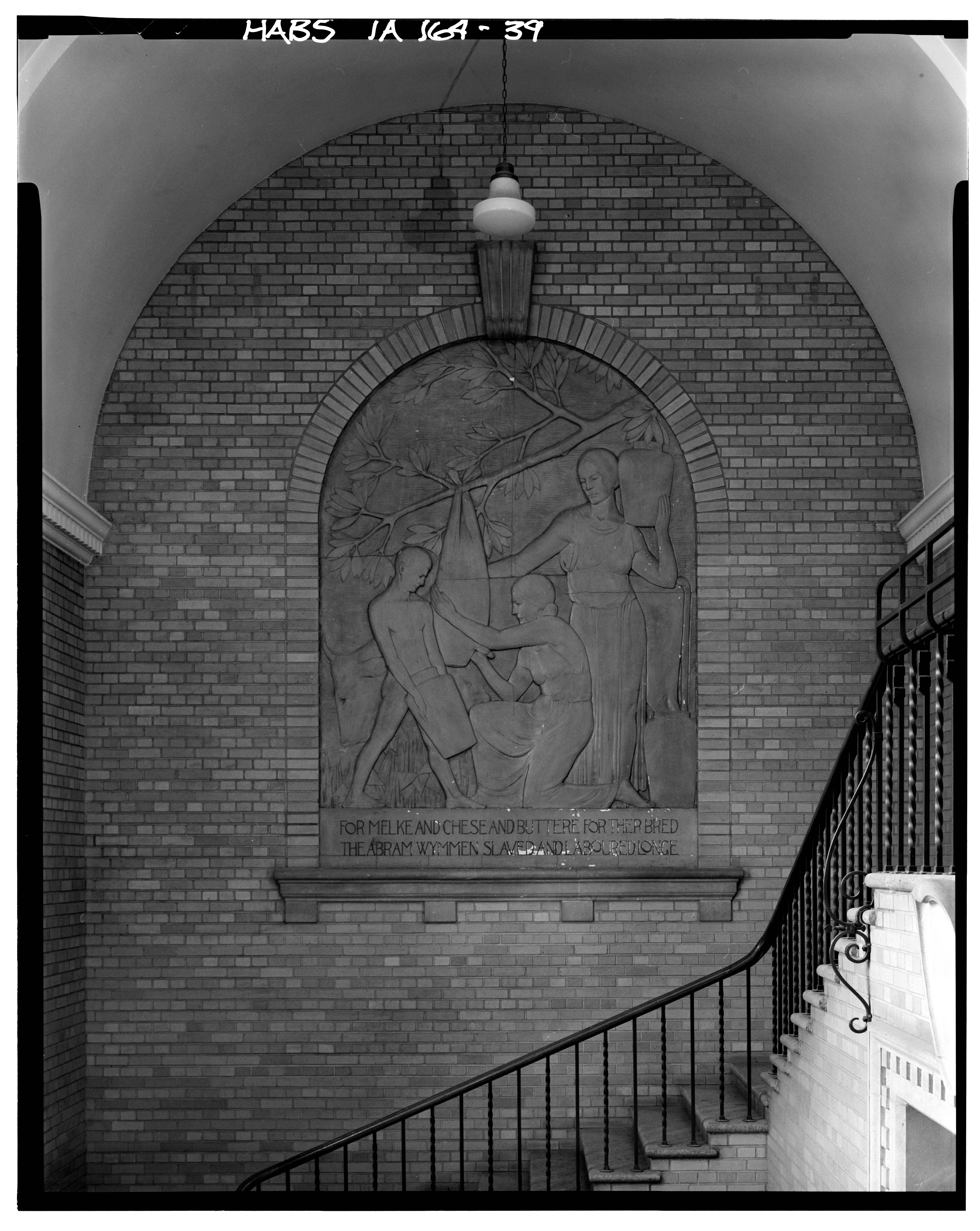
Sculpture in the main stair hall of the Dairy Industry Building, part of Petersen's History of Dairying, 1935.

At the start of the Great Depression he moved to the Midwest, and eventually took a job working for Grant Wood in the Public Works of Art Project headquartered in Iowa City, Iowa. Through a WPA commission to create relief sculptures for the Dairy Industry Building at Iowa State College in Ames, Iowa, he became acquainted with the college president, who appointed him Sculptor in Residence in 1935. This was the first known instance of an artist in residence at a US university. He installed a seven-panel relief mural, The History of Dairying, in April 1935; it was the first of many public sculptures at the college. In addition to his sculptural work, Petersent illustrated Cha-Ki-Shi (1936), a children's book on the Meskwaki people of Tama County. In 1936 he completed the Three Athletes for the State Gym and Reclining Nudes for Roberts Hall. He created the Veterinary Medicine Mural and The Gentle Doctor in 1938. That same year, he was offered a permanent studio space by Dean Charles Murray—a studio which he occupied for the rest of his career. He was eventually appointed associate professor at the college.

In 1938, Petersen was commissioned to create a portrait plaque of the University of Kentucky's president. He took a summer trip to Kentucky for the commission and carried out a series of drawings of rural Kentucky scenes while there. These drawings were the basis of a series of small sculptures over the next several years.

In the spring semester of 1939, male students were admitted to his sculpture class for the first time. His sculpture Fountain of the Four Seasons was unveiled in 1941, and followed by Marriage Ring in 1942. The college also recognized Petersen with a dinner in his honor and an exhibition at the Memorial Union in 1942. In 1944, Library Boy and Girl was installed at the Parks Library. In 1955 he completed Conversations before retiring from his position at the Iowa State in 1955 at the age of 70.

After retiring, he continued to create portraits and reliefs for private and public commissions in the late 1950s. He also taught clay modeling to handicapped children twice a week as a volunteer at Smouse Opportunity School in Des Moines. In 1959 he began to design his piece A Dedication to the Future. Petersen died of cancer on 4 April 1961, four days after inspecting and signing the last casting mold for A Dedication to the Future for the Fisher Community Center in Marshalltown, Iowa.

== Legacy ==
In 1964, eighty of the remaining works in Petersen's studio were offered for sale to the public on behalf of Charlotte Petersen by close friends. In 1985, Petersen's wife Charlotte and daughter Mary sold many of Christian's studio sculptures. Mary also found more than 400 of his sketches and early photographs that had been stored since 1945. They are now in the Christian Petersen Collection, Brunnier Art Museum.

Petersen's sculptures have the subject of a number of exhibitions since his death. In 1976, the Brunnier Gallery, now the Brunnier Art Museum, presented the exhibition "Christian Petersen". The exhibition "Christian Petersen Remembered," which included small sculptures and models from private collections, was held at the Octagon Center for the Arts in Ames, Iowa in 1986. In 1988, the exhibition "Christian Petersen: Images of Youth" was held at the Brunnier Gallery and Museum, and his sculpture Drought was included in "New Deal Art of the Upper Midwest: An Anniversary Exhibition" at the Sioux City Art Center in Sioux City, Iowa. In 1996, Petersen's Two Children were loaned to the Sioux City Art Center for the exhibition "A Decade of Motivation: Iowa and the Federal Arts Project, 1933-1943". In 2000, a retrospective exhibition, "Christian Petersen, Sculptor," opened along with a publication with the same title consisting of a series of essays and a catalog of Petersen's known lifetime works by the Brunnier Art Museum in celebration of its 25th anniversary.

Though his major works consist primarily of public art at Iowa State University and the surrounding community, his early work has received recent attention, including a retrospective exhibition in 2006 of his work from the 1910s and 1920s done at the Art Students League, in Rhode Island, Boston, and Attleboro, MA. Many of these early works of art are unlocated and Iowa State University Museums is actively searching for the sculptures or information leading to their location.

Efforts have been made to preserve and protect Petersen's statues. The Brunnier Museum and Gallery announced a program to inspect and conserve Petersen's outdoor sculptures in 1986. Some of the sculptures which he created for Iowa State College have been recast, including The Gentle Doctor and Marriage Ring. Petersen's dairy courtyard sculptures, after a nomination submitted by Patricia L. Bliss, were accepted for the National Register of Historic Places on 7 April 1987.

In 1980, the Iowa State University College of Design established the annual Christian Petersen Design Award to honor staff, faculty, alumni and friends of the university. A biography written by Patricia Lounsbury Bliss, Christian Petersen Remembered, was published by Iowa State University Press in 1986.

The Christian Petersen Art Museum opened in 2007 in historic Morrill Hall, Iowa State University campus. Its exhibitions include works of art by Petersen as well as his contemporaries. In 2009, the Anderson Sculpture Garden surrounding Morrill Hall was dedicated. Christian Petersen's Cornhusker, 4-H Calf, Library Boy and Girl Models, Seated Abraham Lincoln, and Reclining Nudes are all located in the sculpture garden.

== Selected works ==
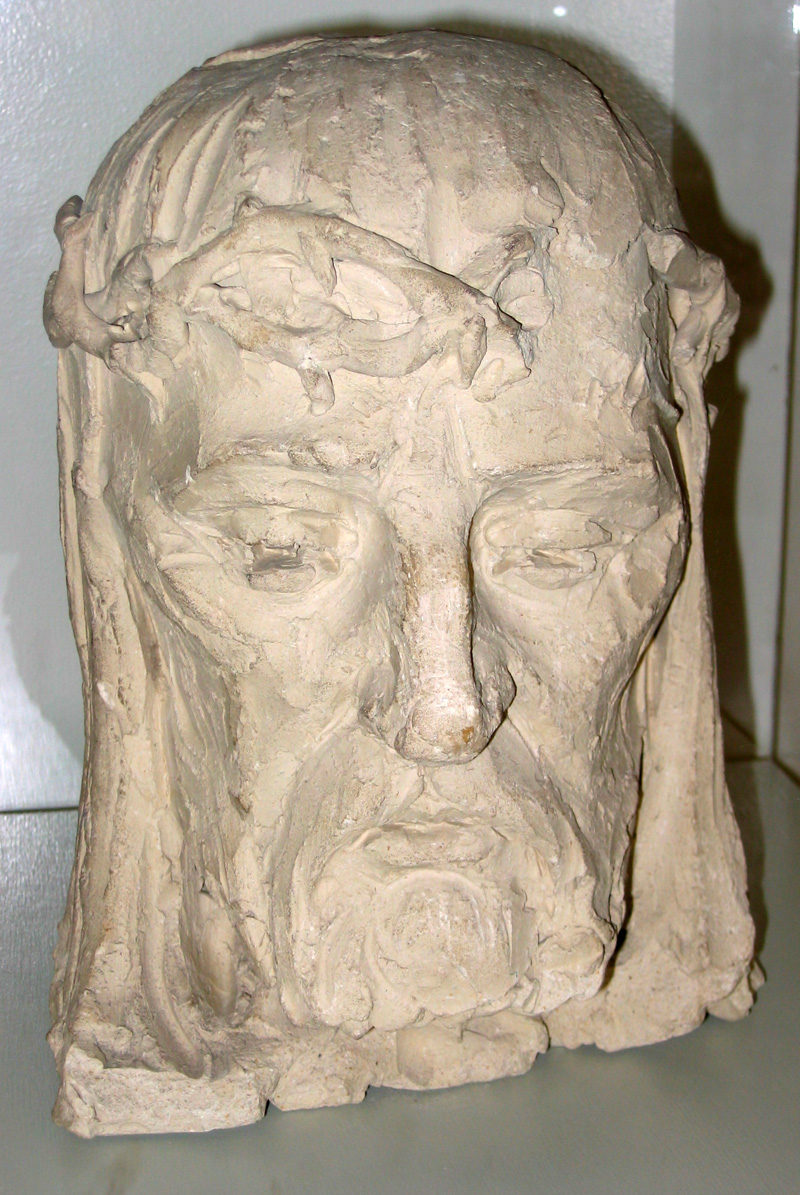
Head of Christ, in Saint Thomas Aquinas Catholic Church, Ames, Iowa

- History of Dairying Mural(1933–34)
- Gentle Doctor (1936)
- Three Athletes (1936)
- Library Boy and Girl (1944–1945)
- Fountain of Four Seasons (1941)
- Flood (1938)
- Soon After Flood (1939)
- Old Woman in Prayer (1940)
- Madonna of the Prairie (1941)
- Marriage Ring (1942)
- The Marriage Ring (1942)
- The Price of Victory (1944)
- Library Boy & Girl (1944)
- Conversations (1945–1955)
- Viking (1946)
- George Washington Carver (1949)
- Christ with Bound Hands (1950)
- Attleboro War Chest (1918), unlocated
- Panthers (1920s), bronze, previously unlocated, now installed at Iowa State.

== Quotations ==
- "An artist is one of you. Very much one of you. He must be in your hearts, and you in his."
- "A number of years ago, I had the feeling that the center of culture would eventually find itself in the Middlewest. I felt the east has so much conscious culture that it was subject to spells of indigestion-and it was taking to 'isms' as some folks take to patent medicines."
- "Here in the midwest, I felt folks would be more natural, and I have found it to be so in the main...So judge for yourself. Create an American art, here in the rich soil of the middlewest, where America has its roots. Here shall be the soil and the seed and the strength of art."
