= List of Iowa State University alumni =

This list includes notable alumni, non-matriculating, faculty, and staff of what is now Iowa State University (ISU).

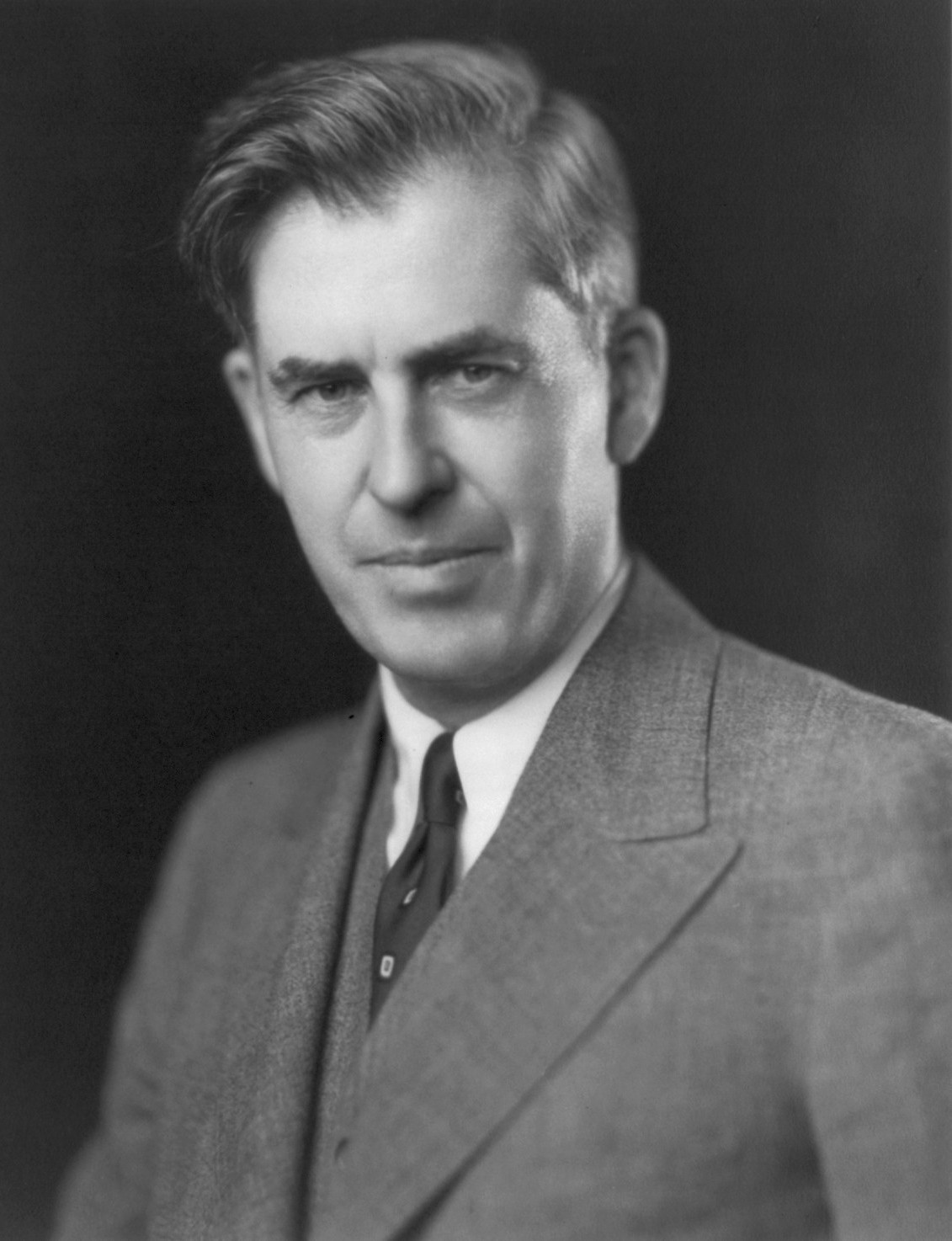
Henry A. Wallace, U.S. vice president (1941–1945), secretary of Agriculture (1933–1940), and secretary of Commerce (1945–1946)

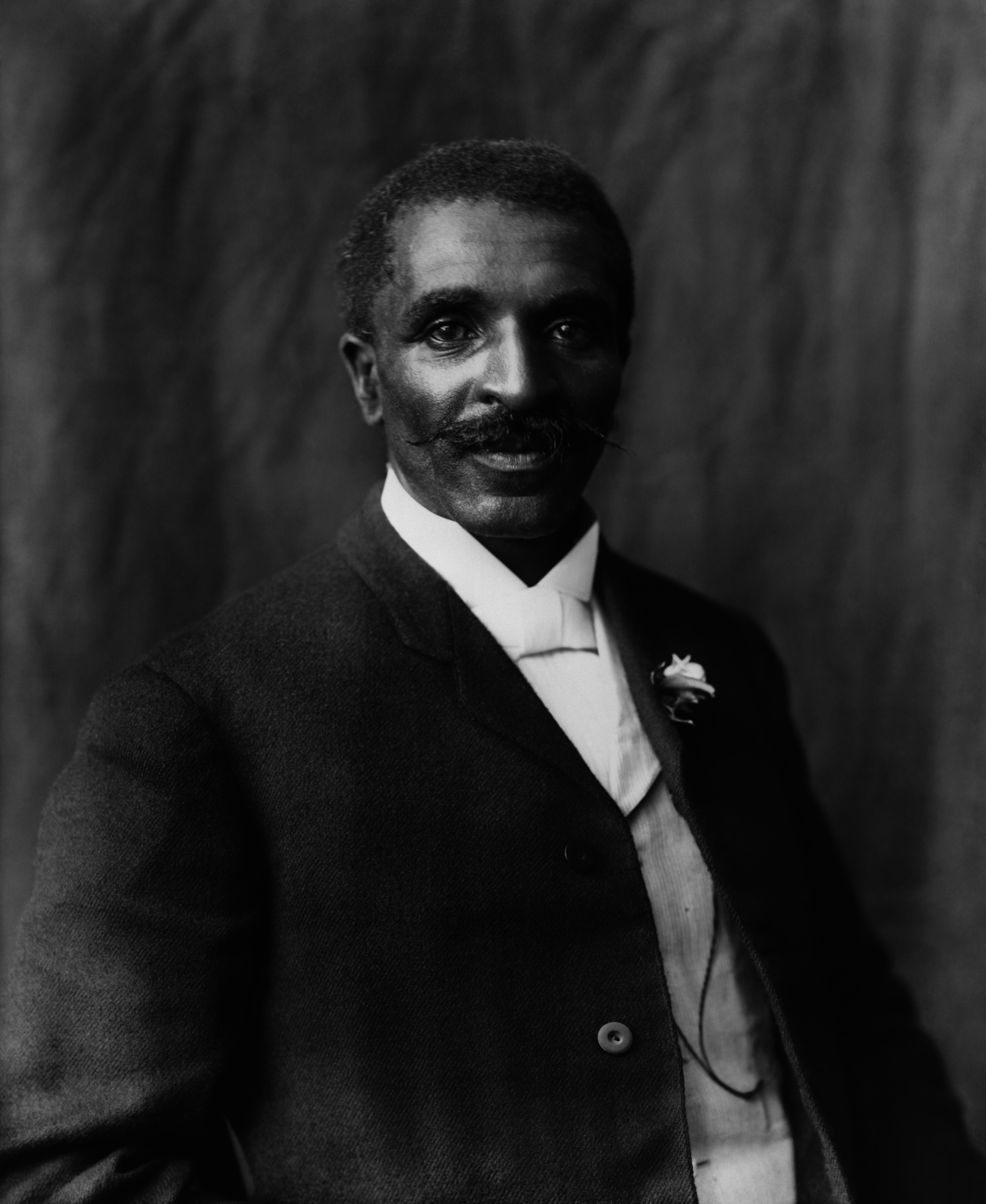
George Washington Carver, American agricultural scientist and inventor

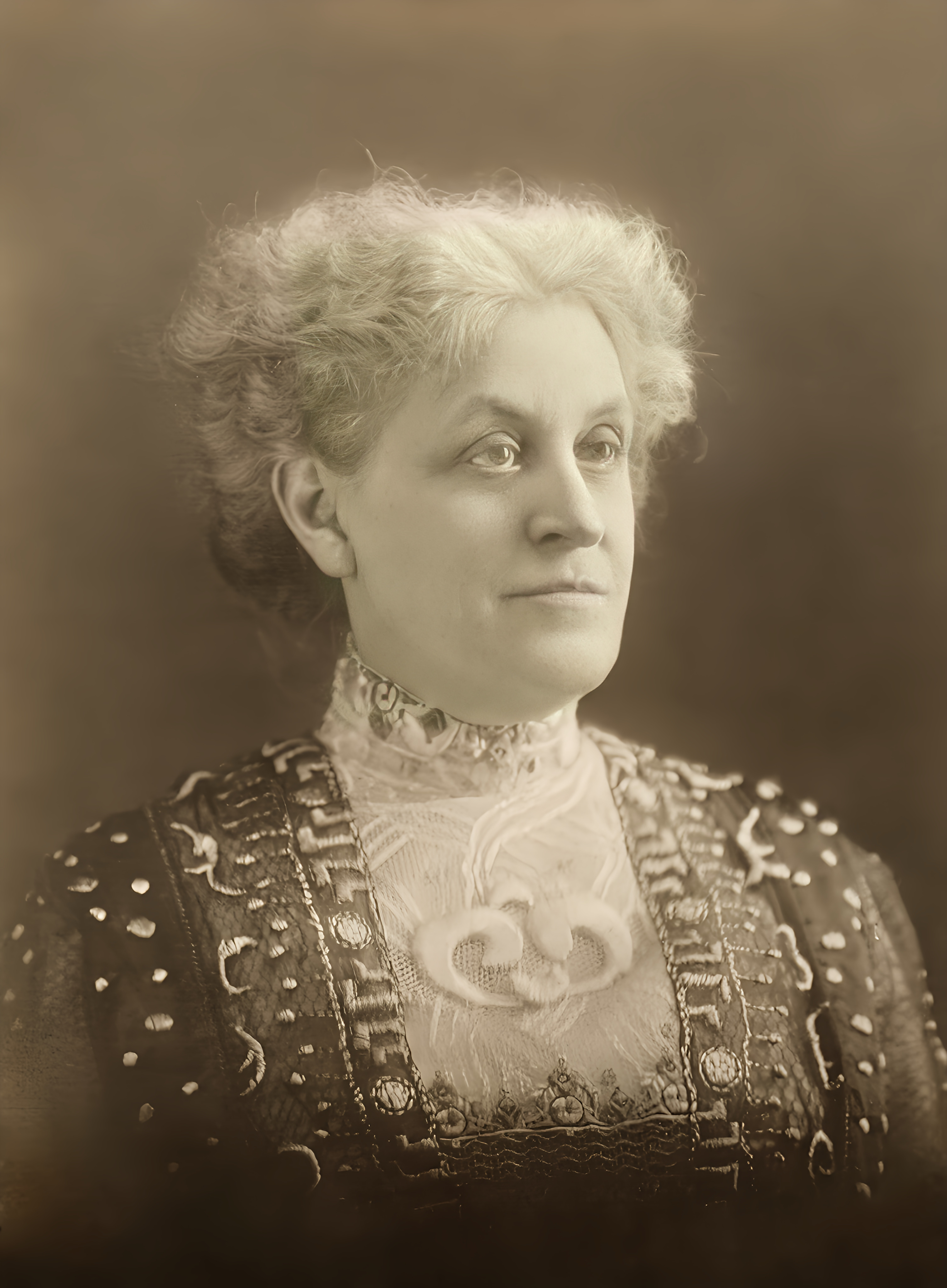
Carrie Chapman Catt, founder of the League of Women Voters

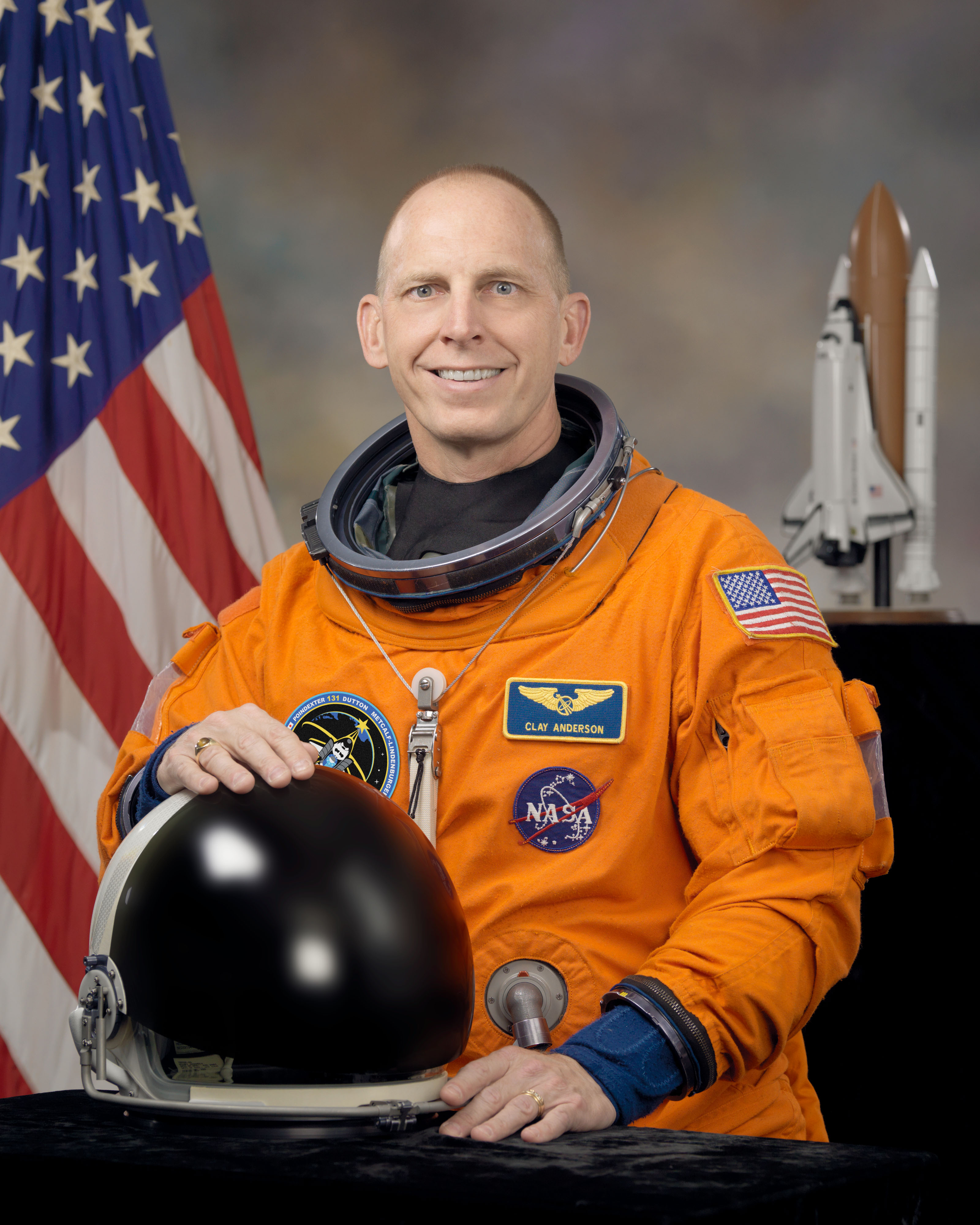
Clayton Anderson, NASA Astronaut

== Academia ==
- Don E. Albrecht (born 1952), rural sociologist
- Aureliano Brandolini (1927–2008), Department of Botany and Agronomy class of 1955, Italian agronomist and development cooperation scholar
- William R. Brinkley, Biology PhD 1964, Dean Emeritus of Graduate School of Biomedical Sciences, Baylor College of Medicine
- Robert D. Bullard, Sociology PhD 1976, "father of environmental justice" and Distinguished Professor at Texas Southern University
- Margaret Burchinal (born 1951), quantitative psychologist and statistician known for her research on child care
- Nathaniel Oglesby Calloway (1907–1979), B.S 1930 and Chemistry PhD 1933, first African-American to receive a PhD in chemistry from Iowa State University Professor at the University of Illinois Medical School, medical director of Provident Hospital in Chicago until 1949, and then founded the Medical Associates Clinic of Chicago
- David P. Campbell, B.S. and M.S., creator of Strong-Campbell Interest Inventory, an interest inventory used in career assessment, ISU Distinguished Alumni Award in 2007
- Michael M. Crow (born 1955), Political Science B.A. 1977, president, Arizona State University since 2002
- Niels Ebbesen Hansen (1866–1950), M.S., 1895, Head of the Horticultural Department at South Dakota State University
- JoAnne L. Hewett (born 1960), Physics and Mathematics B.S. 1982, theoretical particle physicist on the faculty of the SLAC National Accelerator Laboratory
- Daniel G. Horvitz (1921–2008), survey statistician, best known for the eponymous Horvitz-Thompson estimator
- Harold Hume (1875–1965), B.S. 1899 and M.S. 1901, noted citrus fruit horticulturalist and president of the University of Florida
- Bhanu Pratap Jena (born 1955), PhD 1988, a cell biologist and professor at the Wayne State University School of Medicine, discovered porosome
- Leonard Klinck (1877–1969), Agriculture M.S., 1905, second president of the University of British Columbia (1919–1940)
- Charles Boynton Knapp (born 1946), B.S. 1968, president of the University of Georgia (1987–1997)
- Samuel Massie (1919–2005), Chemistry PhD 1942, science educator, worked on the Manhattan Project, first African-American to teach at the U.S. Naval Academy
- Rose Mwonya, Kenyan academic
- James L. Oblinger (born 1945), Food Technology M.S. 1970 and Food Technology PhD 1972, Chancellor at North Carolina State University 2005–2009, received the ISU Distinguished Alumni Award in 2006
- Frederick Douglas Patterson (1901–1988), 1927 M.S. and Veterinary Medicine PhD 1923, former president of Tuskegee Institute and founder of the United Negro College Fund
- Francis de los Reyes III, Glenn E. and Phyllis J. Futrell Distinguished Professor and Alumni Distinguished Undergraduate Professor at North Carolina State University
- Donald W. Roberts, Utah State University Research Professor Emeritus and Cornell University Roy A. Young Scientist Emeritus Chair, see § Donald W. Roberts below
- Emil Steinberger (1928–2008), endocrinologist and founding president of the American Society of Andrology
- Subra Suresh (born 1956), Mechanical Engineering M.S. 1979, former president of Carnegie Mellon University, the former director of National Science Foundation, and the former Dean of Engineering at M.I.T.
- My T. Thai, computer science engineer and professor at University of Florida
- Edward M. Walsh (born 1939), M.S. 1963 and PhD 1964, founder of the University of Limerick
- Don Weinkauf, Chemical Engineering B.S. 1986, Dean of the School of Engineering at the University of St. Thomas (since 2008), and former Chair of the Department of Engineering at the New Mexico Institute of Mining and Technology
- Earl G. Yarbrough (born 1946), Industrial Education PhD 1976, former president of Savannah State University (2007–2011)

== Arts ==
=== Literature ===
- Jill Dopf Viles, writer known for researching and having Emery-Dreifuss muscular dystrophy and Partial lipodystrophy

=== Design ===
- Oshoke Pamela Abalu (born 1978), co-founder of The Love and Magic Company and former Chief Architect at MetLife
- Jeremy Caniglia (born 1970), Fine Arts B.F.A. 1993, illustrator of book covers for fantasy and horror genres
- Leon Quincy Jackson (1926/1927–1995), architect, professor, and early African-American architect in Oklahoma and Tennessee; attended classes but did not graduate
- Joey Kirkpatrick (born 1952), glass artist, sculptor, wire artist, and educator
- Michael Mabry (born 1955), attended for only one year, graphic designer and illustrator
- Conde McCullough (1887–1946), civil engineering graduate in 1910, noted bridge engineer and architect
- Richard Schultz (born 1926), furniture designer
- Ken Smith, landscape architect

=== Performing arts ===
- Mallory Snyder (attended but did not graduate), Sports Illustrated swimsuit model, actress, MTV's The Real World: Paris
- Chris Soules, Agriculture B.S., actor, contestant on season 10 of ABC's The Bachelorette and Season 19 of The Bachelor
- Carol Wilson B.A., operatic soprano

== Business ==
- Stephanie A. Burns (born 1955), Organic Chemistry PhD 1982, chairman, president and CEO, Dow Corning, winner of 2011 International Palladium Medal
- Vance D. Coffman (born 1944), Aerospace Engineering B.S. 1967, retired chairman and CEO, Lockheed Martin, member of National Academy of Engineering
- Edward C. Droste, CEO and founder of Provident Management Corporation, co-founder of Hooters restaurants
- Charles W. "Chuck" Durham, founder of global architecture and engineering firm HDR, Inc. and noted philanthropist
- Roswell Garst, established one of the world's leading seed corn companies; hosted Nikita Khrushchev on his farm in 1959
- Antti Herlin, fourth chairman of the board of KONE Corporation; richest man in Finland
- Porter Jarvis (1902–1991), president, then chairman of Swift & Company, 1955–1967
- Murray Joslin, pioneer on nuclear energy, vice president of Commonwealth Edison
- Jerry Junkins, chairman and CEO of Texas Instruments
- Shawne Kleckner, founder and owner of The Right Stuf International
- Dennis Muilenburg, chairman, president and chief executive officer of the Boeing Company
- Bruce Roth, inventor of Lipitor; vice president of chemistry, Pfizer
- Todd Snyder, founder of Todd Snyder clothing company and co-founder of Tailgate Clothing Company
- Russell Stover, founder of Russell Stover Candies (attended year and a half but did not graduate)
- Sehat Sutardja, co-founder and CEO of Marvell Technology Group
- Thornton Wilson, former chairman of the board and chief executive officer of the Boeing Company

== Government and politics ==
=== United States ===
==== U.S. vice presidents ====
- Henry A. Wallace (1888–1965), Animal Husbandry B.A. 1910, Vice President of the United States (1941–1945), United States Secretary of Agriculture (1933–1940), United States Secretary of Commerce (1945–1946), founder of Pioneer Hi-Bred, a producer of hybrid seeds for agriculture

==== U.S. cabinet ====
- Ezra Taft Benson (1899–1994), Agriculture Economics M.S. 1927, U.S. Secretary of Agriculture (1953–1961), 13th President of the Church of Jesus Christ of Latter-day Saints
- Lauro Cavazos (born 1927), Economics PhD 1954, U.S. Secretary of Education (1988–1990)
- Henry C. Wallace (1866–1924), B.A. Diary Science 1892, U.S. Secretary of Agriculture (1921–1924), father of U.S. Vice President Henry A. Wallace

==== U.S. governors ====
- Robert D. Blue, governor of Iowa (1945–1949), lieutenant governor of Iowa (1943–1945), speaker of the Iowa House of Representatives (1941–1943)
- Garrey Carruthers (born 1939), Economics PhD 1968, governor of New Mexico (1987–1991); president and CEO of Cimarron Health Plan
- James Benton Grant (1848–1911), attended and then transferred to Cornell, governor of Colorado (1883–1885)
- Bourke B. Hickenlooper (1896–1971), Industrial Science B.A. 1919, Governor of Iowa (1943–1945) and longtime U.S. Senator (1945–1969)
- Frank D. Jackson (1854–1938), governor of Iowa (1894–1896), and Iowa secretary of state (1885–1891)
- John Edward Jones (1840–1896), class of 1865, eighth governor of Nevada (1895–1896)
- Kim Reynolds (born 1959), degree concentrations in Political Science, Business Management, and Communications B.L.S. 2016, lieutenant governor of Iowa (2011–2017), 43rd governor of Iowa (2017–present)

==== U.S. senators ====
- Joni Ernst (born 1970), Psychology B.A. 1992, United States senator from Iowa since 2015, lieutenant colonel (retired) Iowa Army National Guard (1993–2015)
- Tom Harkin (born 1939), Government and Economics B.A. 1962, United States senator from Iowa (1985–2015), United States representative from Iowa's 5th congressional district (1975–1985), and author of Americans with Disabilities Act of 1990 (ADA)
- Herbert E. Hitchcock (1867–1958), attended but did not graduate, United States senator from South Dakota (1936–1938)

==== U.S. representatives ====
- Berkley Bedell (1921–2019), attended for two years but did not graduate, United States representative from Iowa's 6th congressional district (1975–1987)
- Bruce Braley (born 1957), B.A. 1980, United States representative from Iowa's 1st congressional district (2007–2015)
- T. Cooper Evans (1924–2005), B.S. & M.S., United States representative from Iowa's 3rd congressional district (1981–1987)
- Randy Feenstra (born 1969), MPA, United States representative from Iowa's 4th congressional district (2021–present)
- Tom Latham (born 1948), attended but did not graduate, United States representative from Iowa's 4th congressional district (1995–2015)
- Dave Loebsack (born 1952), B.S 1974 and M.A. 1976, United States representative from Iowa's 2nd congressional district (2007–2021)

==== U.S. ambassadors ====
- Charles Manatt (1936–2011), Rural Sociology B.A. 1958, U.S. ambassador to the Dominican Republic (1999–2001) and Chairman of the Democratic National Committee (1981–1985)
- Dan Mozena (born 1949), History and Government B.S. 1970, U.S. ambassador to Angola (2007–2010), and U.S. Ambassador to Bangladesh (2011–2015)
- James Pettit (born 1956), B.A. International Studies, U.S. Ambassador to Moldova (2015–2018)

==== State of Iowa officials ====
- Maurice E. Baringer (1921–2011), B.A. & M.A. Animal Husbandry (1949), treasurer of Iowa (1969–1983), speaker of the Iowa House of Representatives (1967–1969)
- Dale M. Cochran (1928–2018), B.A. Agriculture 1950, Iowa secretary of Agriculture (1987–1999), speaker of the Iowa House of Representatives (1975–1979), member of the Iowa House (1965–1987)
- Dayton Countryman (1918–2011), B.S. Forestry 1940, attorney general of Iowa (1955–57)
- E. Thurman Gaskill (born 1935), Commissioner of both Iowa's Department of Economic Development and its Department of Natural Resources, president of Iowa Corn Growers Association, president of National Corn Growers Association, chairman of the United States Feed Grains Council
- William C. Hayward (1847–1917), did not graduate, Iowa secretary of state (1907–1913)
- Clem F. Kimball (1868–1928), B.A. Mechanical Engineering, lieutenant governor of Iowa (1925–1928)
- Jeff Kurtz (born 1954), did not graduate, Iowa state representative (2019–2021)
- Mary Mosiman (born 1962), B.S. Accounting 1999, Iowa state auditor (2013–2019)
- Bill Northey (born 1959), Agricultural Business B.A. 1981, Iowa secretary of Agriculture (2007–2018)
- Timothy Orr, MG, M.S. Education 1991, Adjutant General, Iowa National Guard (2009-2019)
- Kraig Paulsen (born 1964), speaker of the Iowa House of Representatives (2011–2015)
- Sally Pederson (born 1951), class of 1973, former lieutenant governor of Iowa (1999–2007)
- Elaine Szymoniak (1920–2009), Family Environment M.A. 1977, Iowa state senator (1988–2000)
- Andrew Varley (1934–2018), B.S. Agricultural Economics (1957), speaker of the Iowa House of Representatives (1973–1975)
- Jo Ann Zimmerman (1936–2019), took graduate classes but did not receive a degree, first female lieutenant governor of Iowa (1987–1991) and member of the Iowa House of Representatives (1983–1987

==== Other U.S. officials ====
- Katharine Abraham (born 1954), B.S. Economics 1976, commissioner of the Bureau of Labor Statistics (1993–2001), member of the Council of Economic Advisers under President Obama (2011–2013)
- James Clark Jr. (1918–2006), B.A. Animal Husbandry (1941), president of the Maryland State Senate (1979–1983)
- Harvey Gantt (born 1943), transferred to Clemson University, becoming the first black student to be admitted, mayor of Charlotte, NC (1983–1987)
- Gwynn Garnett (1909–1995), B.S. 1934, administrator of the Foreign Agricultural Service 1955–1959, author of the first draft of what would become the Food for Peace program
- Bayard T. Hainer (1860–1933), B.S. 1884, justice of the Territorial Oklahoma Supreme Court (1898–1907)
- Spencer Haven (1868–1938), B.S. 1890, attorney general of Wisconsin (1918–1919)
- Willet M. Hays (1859–1928), M.A. Agriculture 1885, U.S. assistant secretary of Agriculture (1904–1913)
- Jon Lindgren (born 1938), B.S. 1960, mayor of Fargo, North Dakota, 1978–1994 and pioneering LGBT supporter
- Thomas Harris MacDonald (1881–1957), Civil Engineering B.S. 1904, led the development of the Interstate Highway System
- Elwood Mead (1858–1936), Civil Engineering PhD 1883, commissioner of U.S. Bureau of Reclamation during construction of the Hoover Dam, namesake of Lake Mead
- Lenora Moragne (1931–2020), B.S. 1953, nutritionist
- Patrick A. Murphy (born 1958), B.A. 1982, Adjutant General of New York
- Trudy Huskamp Peterson, B.S. 1967, Archivist of the United States (1993–1995)
- Robert W. Sennewald, B.A. 1951, commanding general, United States Army Forces Command (1984–1986)
- Scott Stanzel, B.A. 1995, deputy press secretary at the White House in the George W. Bush administration
- Steven VanRoekel, Management of Information Systems B.A. 1994, second Federal Chief Information Officer of the United States

=== International ===
==== Heads of state and government ====
- Parviz Davoodi (born 1952), Economics PhD 1981, first vice president of Iran
- John Garang (1945–2005), Economics PhD 1981, former commander of SPLA and former vice president of Sudan
- Lee Teng-hui (1923–2023), Agricultural Economics M.S. 1953, former president of the Republic of China (Taiwan)

==== Cabinet ministers ====
- Luis Ernesto Derbez (born 1947), Economics PhD 1980, current academic rector for the Universidad de las Américas Puebla (UDLAP), former Mexican Secretary of Foreign Affairs (2003–2006) and Secretary of Economics (2000–2002)
- Isa Kalantari (born 1952), PhD Agricultural Physiology, Vice President for the Environment of Iran (2017–2021), Minister of Agriculture (1988–2001)
- Sawsan Ali Sharifi (born 1956), Animal Science M.S. 1981 and PhD 1983, former Iraqi Minister of Agriculture in 2004
- Yoo Sang-im (born 1959), Minister of Science and ICT of South Korea (2024–)

==== Other figures ====
- Chen Min-jen, Nuclear Engineering PhD 1983, member of the Legislative Yuan (2005–2008)
- Fred Grimwade (1933–1989), president of the Victorian Legislative Council (1979–1985)
- Jalaluddin Rakhmat (1949–2021), Communications and Psychology 1981, member of the People's Representative Council (2014–2019)
- Anthony Worth, Lord Lieutenant of Lincolnshire

=== Activists ===
- Carrie Chapman Catt (1859–1947), General Science B.S 1880, leader of women's suffrage movement and founder of the League of Women Voters
- Vine Deloria, Jr. (1933–2005), General Science B.S 1958, Native American rights leader and author
- Alex Hershaft (born 1934), animal rights activist and Holocaust survivor
- Ada Simond (1903–1989), Home Economics and Child Development M.S 1936, public health activist and historian
- Kwon Pyong (born 1988), Chinese rights activist who fled to South Korea on a jet ski

== Journalism ==
- Terry A. Anderson, B.A. 1974, former Middle East Bureau chief, the Associated Press
- Sally Jacobsen, B.A., journalist and foreign correspondent, first woman to serve as international editor of the Associated Press
- Jeff Joniak, B.A. 1984, announcer for Chicago Bears radio broadcasts
- Arendo Joustra, attended Graduate School, Department of Journalism and Mass Communication, 1979–1980, Dutch, writer and editor in chief of Elsevier
- Robert E. Kowalski, B.A. 1966, M.S. 1977, bestselling medical author
- John Madson, 1951 (wildlife biology), freelance writer (outdoor sports periodicals); became independent scholar of tallgrass prairie ecology
- Sean McLaughlin, B.A. journalism, former Today Show weather anchor
- Christine Romans, B.A. 1993, CNN chief business correspondent
- Hugh Sidey, B.S., journalist for Life and Time magazines

=== Pulitzer Prize-winning journalists ===
- Robert L. Bartley (1937–2003), B.A. 1959, recipient of the 1980 Pulitzer Prize for Editorial Writing; editor of The Wall Street Journal opinion page, vice president of Dow Jones & Company
- Jennifer Jacobs, journalist, senior White House correspondent for Bloomberg News
- Tom Knudson, Journalism B.A. 1980, two-time Pulitzer Prize winner in 1985 and 1992
- Ted Kooser (born 1939), B.S. 1962, U.S. Poet Laureate (in 2004–2006) and recipient of the 2005 Pulitzer Prize for Poetry
- Lauren K. Soth (1911–1998), Agriculture Journalism B.A. 1932 and Agriculture Economics M.S. 1938, recipient of the 1956 Pulitzer Prize for Editorial Writing

== Science and technology ==
=== Aerospace engineering and mechanical engineering ===
- Clayton Anderson (born 1959), M.S. 1983, NASA astronaut; first Iowa State alum in space
- Steve Bales (born 1942), Aerospace Engineering B.S. 1964, director, Space Operations Management Office at NASA; known for the Apollo 11 landing
- Clarence Chamberlin (attended but did not graduate), aviation pioneer
- Sadanand Joshi, Ph.D. 1980, president of Joshi Technologies International, Inc. (JTI), petroleum engineer, contributed in developing horizontal well technology to produce crude oil and natural gas
- Firouz Naderi (born 1946), Mechanical Engineering B.S. 1969, Iranian-American, served 36 years at NASA's Jet Propulsion Laboratory (JPL), has an asteroid named after him, "5515 Naderi"

=== Agriculture sciences, plant sciences, and food science ===
- Griffith Buck (1915–1991), B.S. 1948, M.S. 1949, Ph.D. 1953, professor of horticulture; developed nearly 100 new varieties of roses
- George Washington Carver (1860s–1943), B.S. 1894, M.S. 1896, botanist and inventor, first African-American student and first African-American faculty member at ISU
- Michael Grimes, MS 1922, PhD 1923, Irish scientist and first professor of microbiology at University College Cork
- David Allen Laird, soil scientist
- Charlotte Maria King (1864–1937), botanist, mycologist and agronomist
- Edward F. Knipling (1909–2000), Entomology Ph.D. 1947, noted entomologist, World Food Prize winner for his work on developing the sterile insect technique
- Rose Marie Pangborn (1932–1990), Food M.S. 1955, food scientist, food technologist, pioneer in the field of sensory analysis of food attributes, and professor at University of California, Davis
- Donald W. Roberts, Utah State University Research Professor Emeritus and Cornell University Roy A. Young Scientist Emeritus Chair, helped to form the subdiscipline of biological pest control, known for studying Metarhizium
- James A. Slater (1920–2008), Ph.D. 1950, noted entomologist, specialist in the study of heteroptera, and professor at the University of Connecticut
- G. Malcolm Trout, B.S. 1923, M.S. 1924, noted food scientist and creator of homogenized milk

=== Chemistry and biochemistry ===
- Julian Banzon (1908–1988), Biochemistry Ph.D. 1940, biochemist, National Scientist of the Philippines
- Lawrence F. Dahl, Ph.D. 1956, professor emeritus of chemistry at the University of Wisconsin–Madison
- Lionel Dahmer, Ph.D. 1966, research chemist and author who was the father of serial killer Jeffrey Dahmer
- Velmer A. Fassel, Ph.D. 1947, chemist, creator of inductively coupled plasma for mass spectrometry
- Lyle Goodhue, B.S. 1928, M.S. 1929, Ph.D. 1934, inventor, research chemist and entomologist
- Darleane C. Hoffman, B.S. 1948, nuclear chemist, part of the team that discovered Seaborgium, faculty senior scientist in the Nuclear Science Division of Lawrence Berkeley National Laboratory, professor in the graduate school at University of California, Berkeley

=== Computer engineering ===
- Dale A. Anderson, M.S. 1959, Ph.D. 1964, pioneer in the field of computational fluid dynamics
- John Vincent Atanasoff (1903–1995), ISU Math M.S. 1926 (see also Atanasoff–Berry Computer), inventor of the first electronic digital computer
- Clifford E. Berry (1918–1963), B.S. 1939, MS 1941, Ph.D. 1948 (see also Atanasoff–Berry Computer), co-developer of the first electronic digital computer
- Bob O. Evans, B.S. 1951, computer pioneer and National Medal of Technology recipient
- John Gustafson, M.S. 1981, Ph.D. 1982, computer scientist and businessman, chiefly known for his work in high performance computing (HPC) such as the invention of Gustafson's law of parallel computing, introducing the first commercial computer cluster
- Tom M. Whitney, BS 1961, MS 1962, Ph.D. 1964, co-inventor of the first handheld calculator able to perform trigonometry, and former executive vice president of engineering at Apple Inc.

=== Mathematics ===
- Albert Turner Bharucha-Reid, mathematician, probability and Markov chain theorist
- Arthur E. Bryson, Jr., "father of modern optimal control theory"
- Gertrude Cox, B.S. 1929, statistician, president of American Statistical Association in 1956, first woman elected into International Statistical Institute
- Wayne Fuller, B.S. 1955, M.S. 1957, Ph.D. 1959, statistician
- Sarah Nusser, master's 1987, Ph.D. 1990, statistician and vice president for research at Iowa State
- Hadley Wickham, Ph.D. 2008, New Zealand statistician, elected fellow of American Statistical Association in 2015, known for ggplot2 and tidy data

=== Medical sciences ===
- Mary Carrington, M.S., Ph.D., director of the basic science program at the Frederick National Laboratory for Cancer Research
- Nancy Cox, BS 1970, virologist at the Centers for Disease Control and Prevention, 2006 U.S. Federal Employee of the Year; one of the 2006 Time 100
- Kate Stevens Harpel, teacher, physician
- Mark Mattson, BS 1979, prominent neuroscientist
- Emil Steinberger, M.D. 1955, endocrinologist, founding president of the American Society of Andrology

== Sports ==
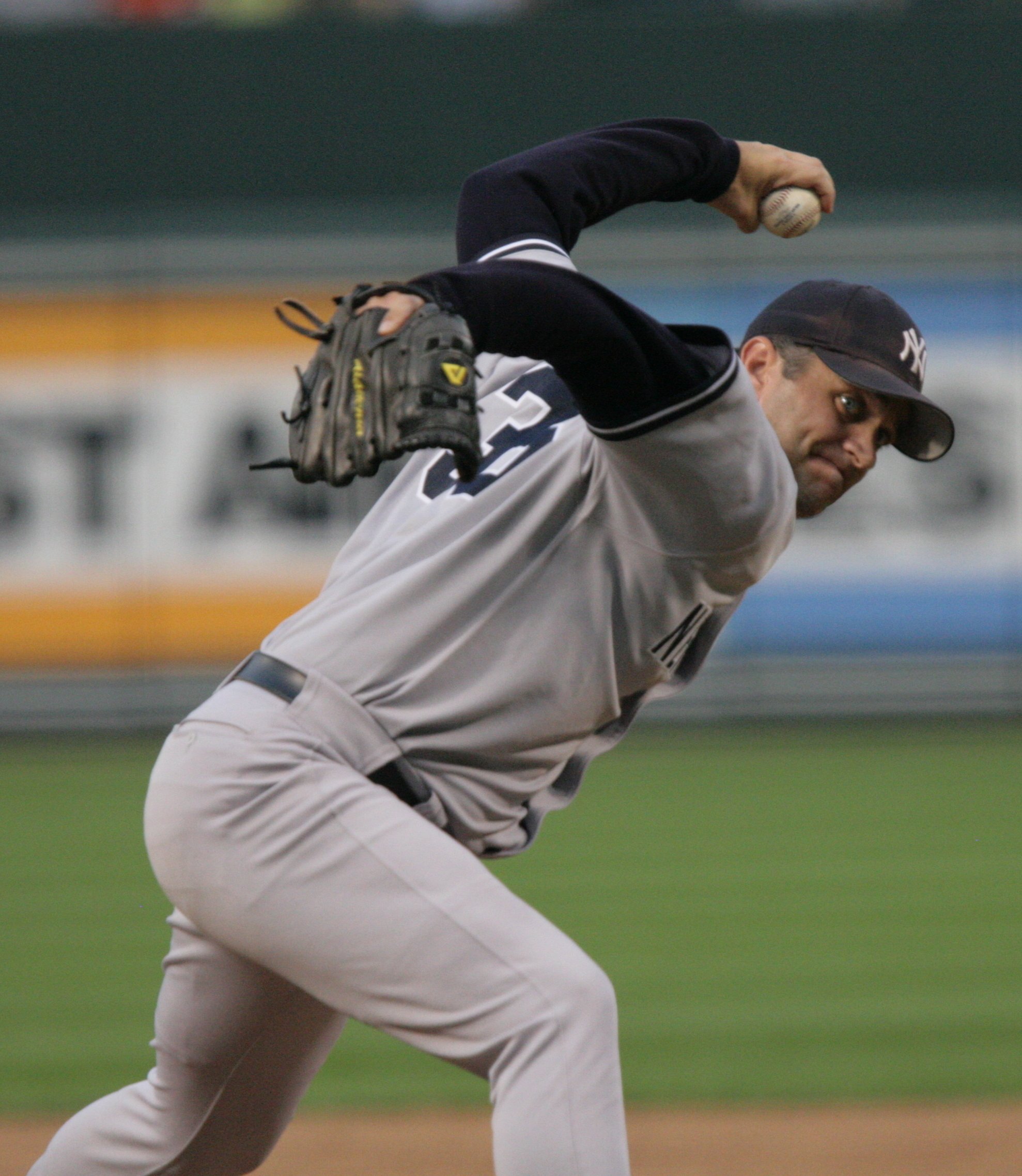
Mike Myers

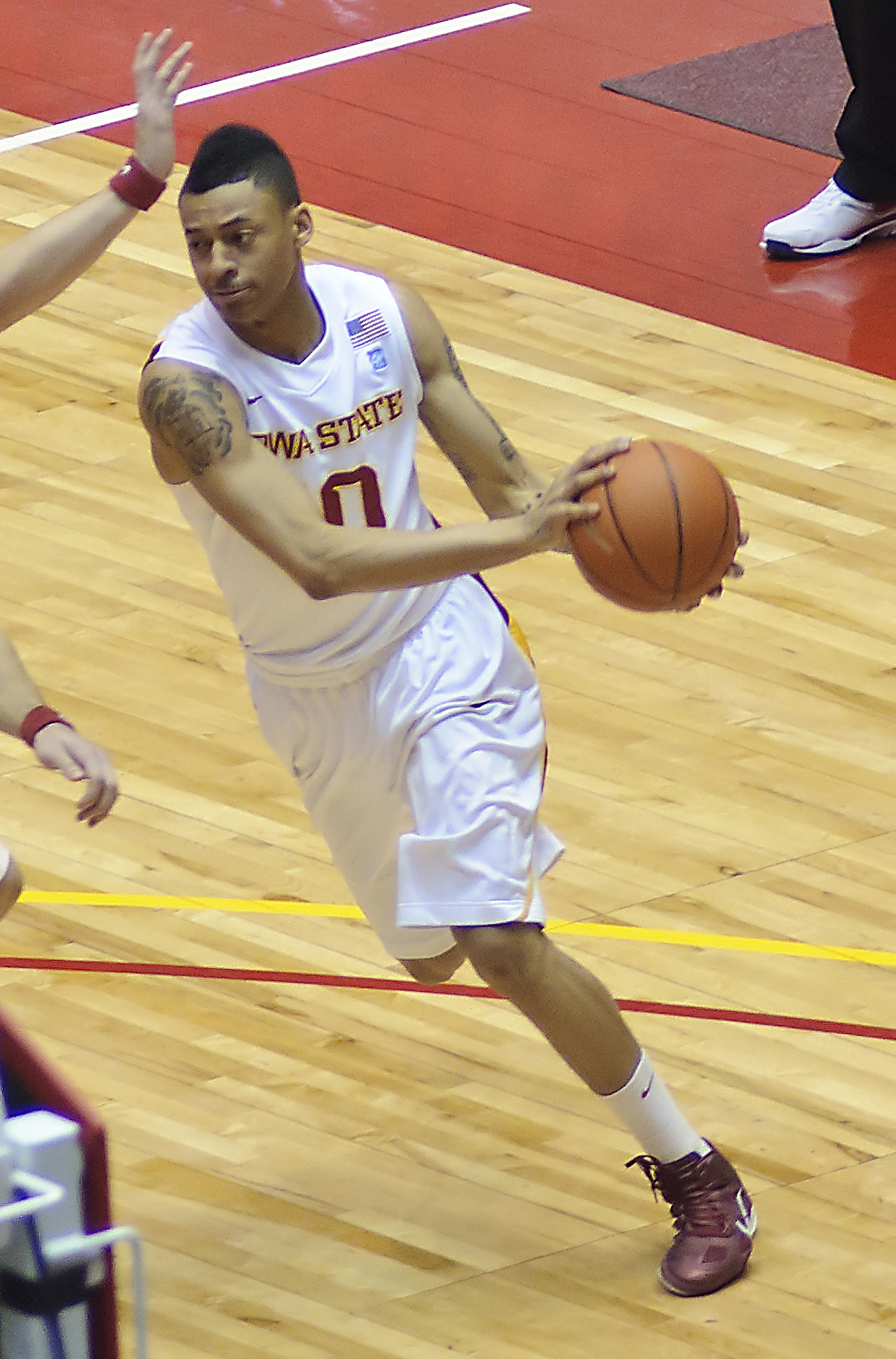
Diante Garrett

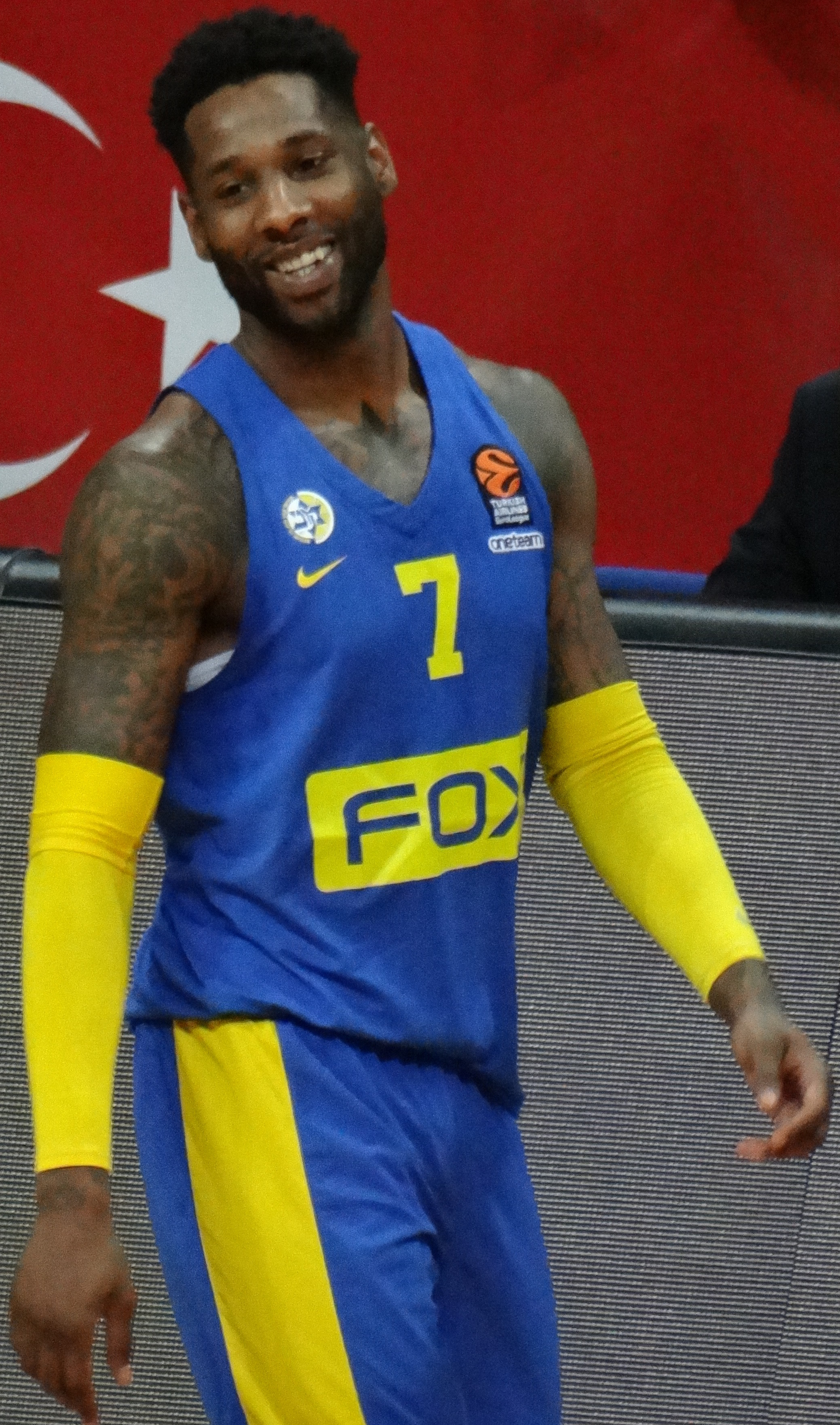
DeAndre Kane

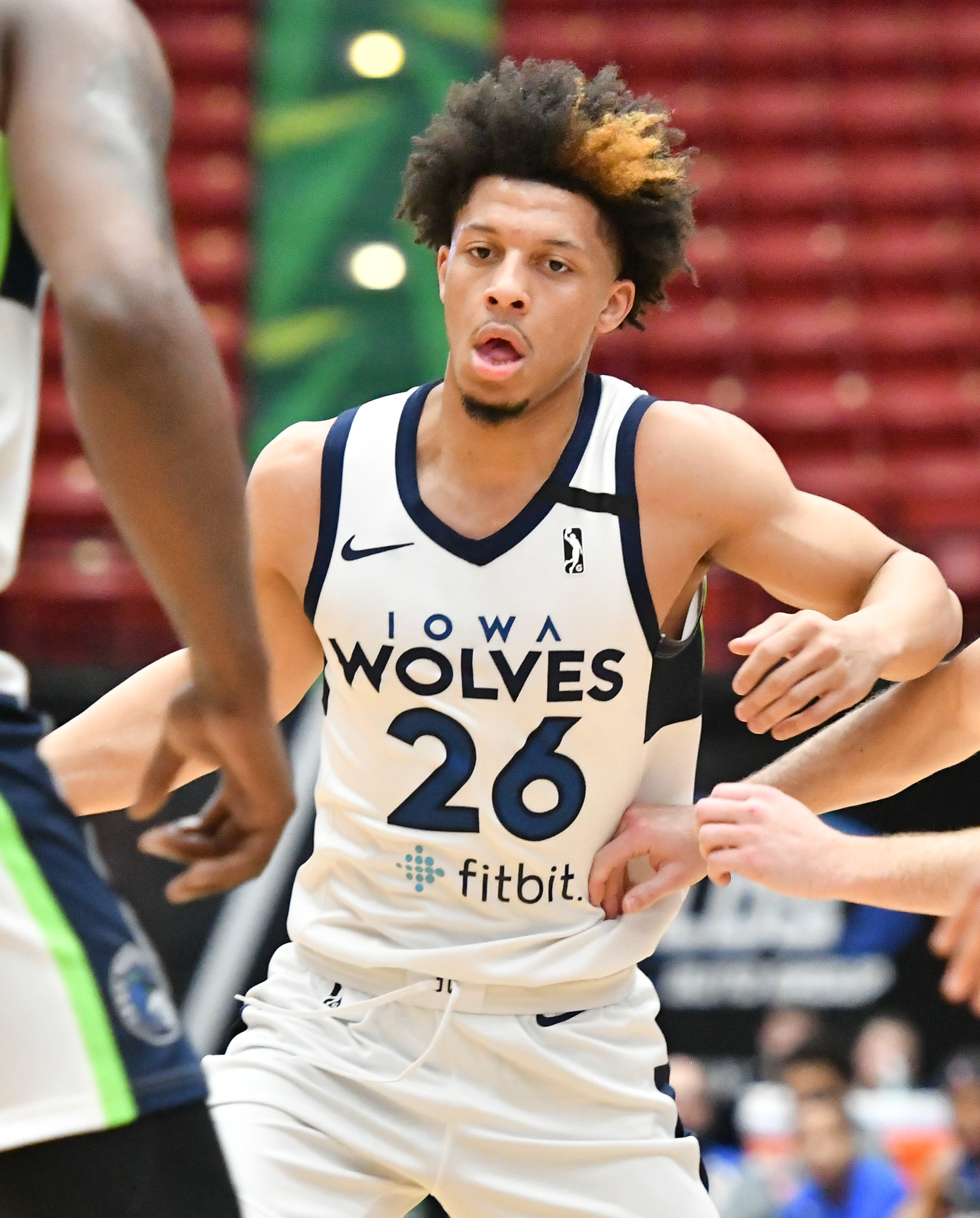
Lindell Wigginton

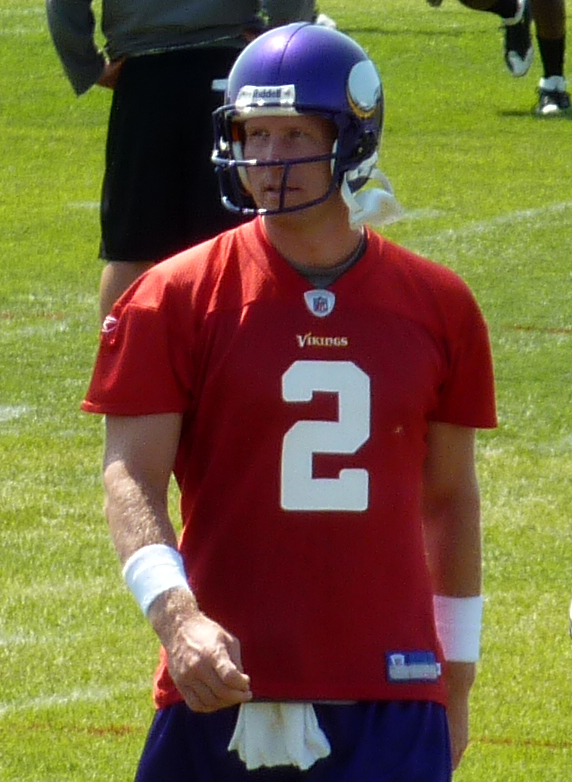
Sage Rosenfels

=== Baseball ===
- Mike Busch, former Major League Baseball player
- Mike Myers, Major League Baseball player
- Jim Walewander, former Major League Baseball player

=== Basketball ===
- Zaid Abdul-Aziz (born Donald A. Smith), NBA player
- Victor Alexander (born 1969), former NBA player
- Chris Babb (born 1990), basketball player in the Israeli Basketball Premier League
- Omaha Biliew, college basketball player 2023–2024
- Will Blalock (born 1983), NBA player
- Deonte Burton (born 1994), NBA player
- Bridget Carleton, current player with the Minnesota Lynx in the WNBA and the Townsville Fire in the Australian WNBL
- Kelvin Cato, former NBA player
- Will Clyburn, professional basketball player, 2016 top scorer in the Israel Basketball Premier League, 2019 EuroLeague Final Four MVP
- Marcus Fizer, former NBA player
- Diante Garrett (born 1988), player for Ironi Ness Ziona of the Israeli Basketball Premier League
- Jeff Grayer, former NBA player
- Tyrese Haliburton (born 2000), NBA player
- Fred Hoiberg, former NBA player and former NBA head coach, Chicago Bulls
- Jeff Hornacek (born 1963), former NBA all-star and former NBA head coach
- Talen Horton-Tucker, NBA player, currently with the Chicago Bulls
- Ashley Joens, Cyclones player; two-time recipient of the Cheryl Miller Award as the top small forward in NCAA Division I women's basketball
- Wes Johnson (played two years for Iowa State prior to transferring to Syracuse ), NBA player
- DeAndre Kane, basketball player in the Israeli Premier League and EuroLeague
- Loren Meyer, retired professional basketball player
- Monté Morris, 2017 First-team All-Big 12, 51st pick in the 2017 NBA draft, Denver Nuggets
- Abdel Nader, NBA player
- Georges Niang, NBA player
- Marial Shayok (born 1995), basketball player in the Israeli Basketball Premier League
- Paul Shirley, NBA player
- Barry Stevens, NBA player
- Jamaal Tinsley, NBA player
- Jackson Vroman, NBA player
- Royce White, former NBA and NBL Canada player
- Lindell Wigginton (born 1998), basketball player in the Israeli Basketball Premier League
- Dedric Willoughby (1974–2023), NBA player

=== Football ===
- George Amundson, NFL player
- Chris Anthony, Arena Football League player
- David Archer, NFL player
- Chris Ash, former head coach of the Rutgers Scarlet Knights football team
- Tony Baker, NFL player
- Joe Beauchamp, NFL player
- Matt Blair, NFL player
- Carl Brettschneider, NFL player
- Stan Campbell, NFL player
- Jordan Carstens, NFL player
- John Cooper, football captain and MVP and later head football coach at Ohio State
- Pat Curran, NFL player
- Troy Davis, NFL player
- Jim Doran, former NFL player for the Detroit Lions and the Dallas Cowboys, MVP NFL 1953 Championship game, played on 51, 53 and 57 Championship teams, 1960 Pro Bowler
- Tim Dobbins, NFL player
- Dennis Gibson, NFL player
- Kelly Goodburn, NFL player
- Breece Hall, NFL player
- Weylan Harding, Arena Football League head coach and former player
- Reggie Hayward, NFL player
- Ennis Haywood, NFL player
- LaMarcus Hicks, NFL player
- Ellis Hobbs, NFL player
- Mike Horacek, NFL and AFL player
- Keith Krepfle, NFL player
- Allen Lazard (Class of 2017), NFL player
- David Montgomery, NFL player
- J.J. Moses, NFL player
- Kelechi Osemele, NFL player, Super Bowl XLVII champion
- Charles Partridge, defensive line and specialists coach of the Wisconsin Badgers football team
- Brock Purdy (Class of 2021), NFL, currently quarterback for the San Francisco 49ers, 2023 Pro Bowler, 2023 NFC champion
- Tom Randall, NFL player
- James Reed, NFL player
- Bruce Reimers, NFL player
- Darius Reynolds, Arena Football League player
- Marcus Robertson, NFL player
- Sage Rosenfels, NFL player
- Oliver Ross, NFL player
- Keith Sims, NFL player
- Mike Stensrud, NFL player
- Jack Trice, football player and pioneer for minorities in sports, died of injuries sustained in a football game
- Tom Vaughn, NFL player
- Seneca Wallace, NFL player
- Chuck Walton, NFL and CFL player
- Chris Washington, NFL player
- Tom Watkins, NFL player
- Don Webb, NFL player
- Gene Williams, NFL player
- Tony Yelk, NFL player

=== Mixed martial arts ===
- Justin Eilers, collegiate football player; retired professional MMA fighter
- Mike Van Arsdale, 1988 NCAA Division 1 Wrestling Champion; current MMA coach

=== Olympics ===
- Glen Brand, 3-time All-American wrestler; 1948 Summer Olympics gold medalist in freestyle wrestling
- Dan Gable, lost only one collegiate wrestling match; 1972 Olympic gold medalist and 1971 World Wrestling Champion, became top wrestling coach in the country at the University of Iowa
- Kevin Jackson, 1992 Olympic Freestyle Wrestling Champion, former mixed martial artist, former head coach for ISU Cyclone Wrestling
- Nawal El Moutawakel, first African woman and first Muslim woman to earn Olympic gold
- Ben Peterson, 2-time NCAA Champion wrestler at Iowa State; 1972 & 1976 Olympic gold and silver medalist respectively
- Cael Sanderson, 4-time NCAA undefeated wrestling champion (159–0) and 2004 Summer Olympics gold medalist, head coach of the Penn State wrestling team
- Jake Varner, 2012 Summer Olympics gold medalist

=== Track ===
- Yobes Ondieki, 10000-meter world record-holder, 1993

=== Cross country ===
- Edwin Kurgat, 2019 NCAA Champion and Olympic qualifier
- Guor Mading Maker, 2-time Olympic marathoner and flag bearer for South Sudan at the 2016 Summer Olympics
- Lisa Uhl, four-time NCAA Division One champion, current NCAA record holder in the 10,000 meters

=== Cheerleading ===
- Louie Conn, NFL cheerleader for the Minnesota Vikings

=== Wrestling ===
- Nate Carr, Olympic bronze medalist
- Darryl Peterson, NCAA All-American and former professional wrestler
- Trevor Smith, professional mixed martial artist, formerly competed in UFC's Middleweight Division
- Chris Taylor, Olympic bronze medalist and professional wrestler
- Justin Wren (attended), originally had a wrestling scholarship but had an injury, formerly competed in Bellator MMA

=== Ultramarathon ===
- Pete Kostelnick, 2015 1st place Badwater 135 Ultramarathon, 23hr 27min 10sec

== Notable faculty and staff ==
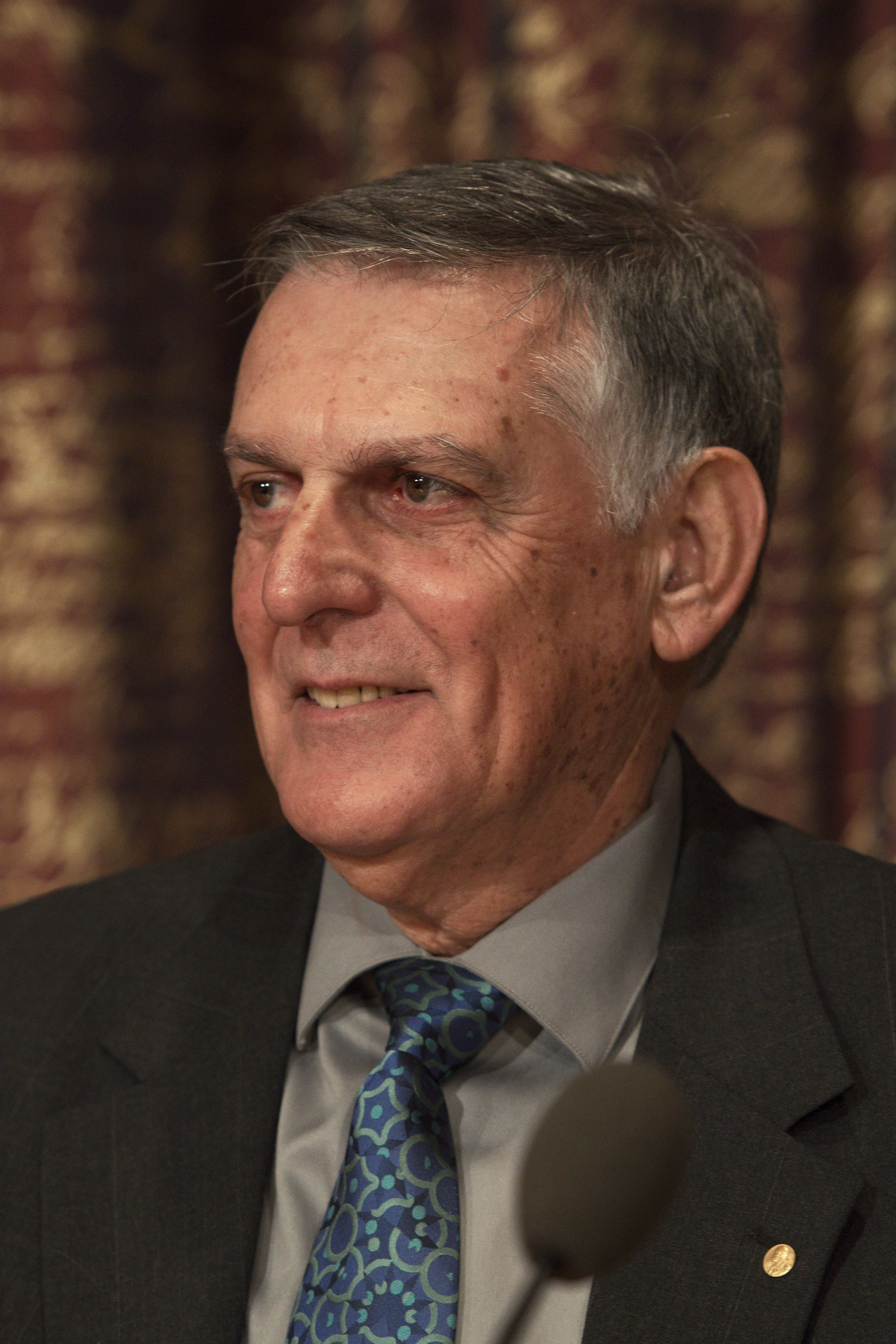
Dan Shechtman

=== Nobel laureates ===
- Leonid Hurwicz (2007, Nobel Memorial Prize in Economics), for having laid the foundations of mechanism design theory
- Theodore Schultz (1979, Nobel Memorial Prize in Economics), for "pioneering research into economic development research with particular consideration of the problems of developing countries"
- Dan Shechtman (2011, Nobel Prize in Chemistry), for "the discovery of quasicrystals"
- George Stigler (1982, Nobel Memorial Prize in Economics), for his contribution on capture theory

=== Pulitzer Prize ===
- Jane Smiley, recipient of the 1992 Pulitzer Prize for fiction

=== Government and politics ===
- James Wilson (1835–1920), professor who later became United States Secretary of Agriculture, Dean of Agriculture and director of the agricultural experiment station 1890–1897

=== Arts ===
==== Literature ====
- Charlotte H. Bruner, scholar and translator of African women's literature
- Joseph Geha, award-winning author
- Fern Kupfer, novelist
- Tito Perdue, novelist and author of Lee; former assistant professor and social sciences bibliographer at the ISU library

==== Visual arts ====
- Christian Petersen, sculptor, whose works appear around campus
- Priscilla Kepner Sage, textile artist

=== Science and technology ===
==== Agriculture sciences, plant sciences, and food science ====
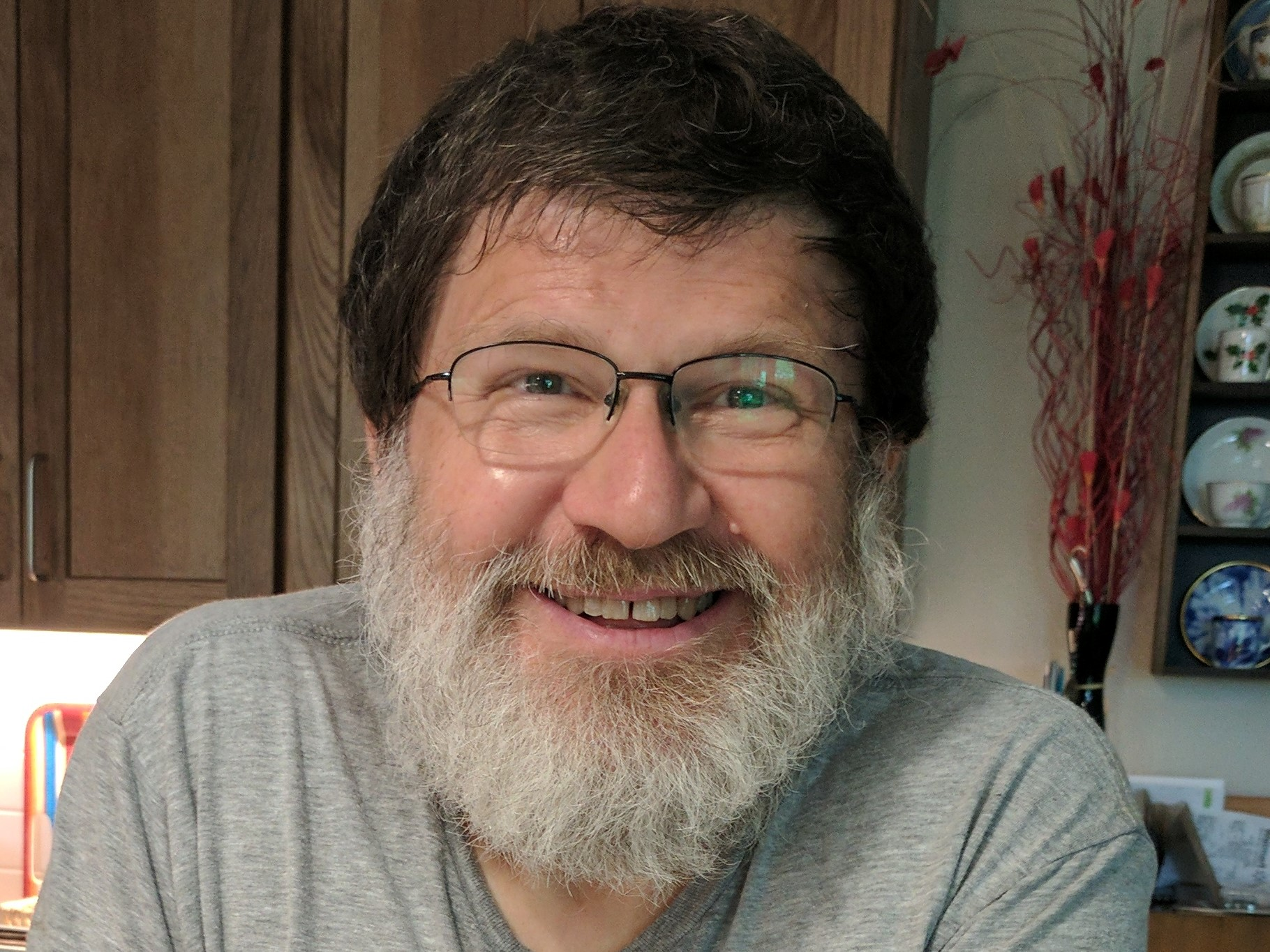
Raymond Arritt in 2017

- Raymond Arritt, agricultural meteorology 1993–2018
- Jay L. Lush, pioneer of modern animal breeding
- Albert M. Ten Eyck, president of the American Society of Agronomy
- J. (Hans) van Leeuwen, emeritus professor of Civil, Construction and Environmental Engineering at ISU, and developer of MycoMeal fungal feed and purified alcohol

==== Chemistry and biochemistry ====
- John B. Balinsky, biochemist, physiologist, chair of zoology
- L. K. Doraiswamy, chemical engineer, proponent of Organic synthesis engineering and Padma Bhushan winner
- Henry Gilman, known as the "father of organometallic chemistry"
- Nellie May Naylor (1885–1992), influential chemistry professor at Iowa State University, one of the earliest female chemistry professors at ISU, teaching 1908–1955
- Klaus Ruedenberg, chemist
- Frank Spedding, noted Ames Laboratory chemist who developed the Ames Process as a part of the Manhattan Project; namesake of Spedding Prize

==== Computer science and engineering ====
- John Vincent Atanasoff (1903–1995), ISU Math M.S. 1926 (see also Atanasoff–Berry Computer), inventor of the first electronic digital computer
- Mary Clem (1905–1979), mathematician, human computer; led the computing lab at ISU
- Carolina Cruz-Neira, a pioneer of virtual reality (VR) technology, former ISU faculty and 2002 co-founder of the Virtual Reality Applications Center

==== Economics ====
- Elizabeth Ellis Hoyt (1893–1980), economist, considered the inventor of the modern day Consumer Price Index

==== Military technology ====
- James Millikin Bevans, U.S. Air Force major general
- James Lorraine Geddes (1827–1887), Civil War general; acting university president 1875–77
- Roy L. Kline, brigadier general, USMC

==== Mathematics ====
- Wayne Arthur Fuller, statistician noted for his textbooks on econometrics and survey sampling
- Oscar Kempthorne, statistician and geneticist, and Distinguished Professor of Science and Humanities at Iowa State University
- Sarah Nusser, statistician and expert on Survey methodology, and Iowa State vice president for research
- George W. Snedecor, statistician and pioneer of modern applied statistics in the U.S., namesake of Snedecor Award

==== Medicine ====
- Elsa Murano, former Iowa State University assistant professor in the Department of Microbiology, Immunology and Preventative Medicine; 23rd president of Texas A&M University

==== Physics ====
- Allan Mackintosh, noted solid-state physicist, director of Nordic Institute for Theoretical Physics

=== Sports ===
==== Basketball ====
- Larry Eustachy, former men's basketball coach, 2000 NCAA National Coach of the Year
- Tim Floyd, former men's basketball coach with 81–49 record and first coach with three consecutive 20-win seasons
- Johnny Orr, most successful coach in Iowa State and Michigan men's basketball history

==== Football ====
- Mack Brown, head coach at University of Texas (at Iowa State 1979–1982)
- Pete Carroll, head coach of the Seattle Seahawks, former coach at University of Southern California (at Iowa State 1978)
- Tom Herman, head coach at University of Texas (at Iowa State 2009–2011)
- Johnny Majors, renowned football head coach (at Iowa State 1968–1972)

==== Martial arts ====
- Yong Chin Pak, Grandmaster, instructs taekwondo, hapkido, and judo
