= Carol Wilson =

Carol Wilson may refer to:

- Carol Wilson (soprano), American opera singer
- Carol Wilson (footballer) (born 1952), British footballer
- Carol Wilson, founder of Dindisc
- Carol Espy-Wilson, electrical engineer
- Cully Wilson (Carol Wilson, 1892–1962), Canadian ice hockey player

== See also ==
- Caroline Wilson (disambiguation)
