= Emil Steinberger =

Emil Steinberger may refer to:

- Emil Steinberger (actor), Swiss comedian, writer, director and actor.
- Emil Steinberger (endocrinologist), American endocrinologist.
