= The 8-Week Cholesterol Cure =

Health book by Robert Kowalski

The New 8 Week Cholesterol Cure
- paperback cover photo
- Author: Robert Kowalski
- Language: English
- Published: Harper & Row, 1987
- Publication place: United States
- Pages: 448
- ISBN: 0-06-056460-1

The New 8-Week Cholesterol Cure is a 1987 health book by Robert Kowalski, who wrote it as a personal recollection about dealing with cholesterol issues. Kowalski wrote the book after having two coronary bypass surgeries and a heart attack. He created the program detailed in the book after he realized that a diet change alone would not help him, and the book is sometimes credited with popularizing oat bran as a health food. Kowalski published three other books in the 8-Week Cholesterol Cure series as well as The Blood Pressure Cure: 8 Weeks to Lower Blood Pressure without Prescription Drugs, which dealt with blood pressure.

In October 1988 a lawsuit was filed by 16 plaintiffs against Kowalski and Harper & Row. The plaintiffs alleged that following the advice listed in the book caused them emotional and physical harm and that the book was not properly researched by its author or publisher.

== Synopsis ==
In the book Kowalski writes about his experiences with cholesterol and uses it to help recommend changes that readers can use to improve their cholesterol. It includes information about cholesterol and what foods people can eat to immediately reduce cholesterol, as well as what vitamins can assist in this process. He also recommends exercise and emphasizes the use of niacin as a cure for cholesterol.

== Reception ==
The book became a bestseller after its release in 1987 and was one of the top selling books of 1988, selling so well that Harper & Row opted to postpone its paperback release. It remained on the New York Times Bestsellers List for over 100 weeks and has since been republished in multiple editions, including an audiobook version.

Jerrold Winter criticized the work in his 2012 book True Nutrition, True Fitness, noting that niacin has been used by physicians after other methods have failed and that it is "quite possible that, as a result of reading his book, more will be harmed by the drug than helped."
