= VRAC =

VRAC may refer to:

- Valladolid RAC, Spanish rugby union club
- Virtual Reality Applications Center, research center within the Engineering Teaching and Research Complex (ETRC) at Iowa State University
- Volume-regulated anion channel, which is crucial to the regulation of cell size
