= Caroline Wilson =

Caroline Wilson may refer to:

- Caroline Wilson (diplomat) (born 1970), British diplomat and lawyer
- Caroline Wilson (journalist) (born 1960), Australian sports journalist
- Caroline Wilson (Coronation Street), fictional character
- Caroline Fry (1787–1846), also known as Mrs Caroline Wilson, British writer

== See also ==
- Carol Wilson (disambiguation)
