= Oshoke Abalu =

Nigerian-American architect and futurist

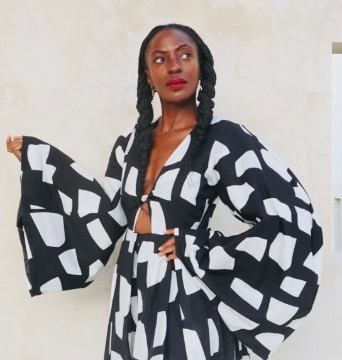
- Born: Oshokenoya Abalu; March 19, 1978 (age 48)
- Other names: Pamela Abalu, Pamela Abalu-Broadwater, Oshokenoya Pamela Abalu
- Education: Iowa State University
- Occupations: entrepreneur, design leader, architect
- Known for: MetLife

Oshoke Abalu (born 19 March 1978), also known as Pamela Abalu, is a Nigerian-American architect. She is the co-founder of the Love and Magic Company, a startup studio.

== Early life and education ==
Abalu was born in Lagos, Nigeria, and spent her early childhood in Kano, Northern Nigeria before attending an all-girls boarding school at the age of 10. Her father's work with the United Nations on agricultural economics introduced her to the globe, relocating her to diverse locales around the world. She graduated with a bachelor's degree in Architecture from Iowa State University, located in Ames, Iowa.

In 2005, Abalu obtained her architecture license.

== Career ==
Abalu landed her first internship in architecture after her freshman year in college at the New York firm of Perkins Eastman. She has worked with many premier brands, including Bloomberg L.P., L'Oréal, and Goldman Sachs. She became the Chief Architect at MetLife in 2011, overseeing architectural design across the company's 1,500 properties in nearly 50 countries for more than 57,000 employees.

Oshoke is a co-founder of The Love & Magic Company, the faculty at The Inner MBA, and a Crain's 40 Under 40 honoree in 2016. Oshoke and her work have been featured in Smart Planet, Real Simple Magazine, Domino Magazine, Interior Design Magazine, ABC, NBC, Fast Company, TED, BOLD TV and more.
