= Don E. Albrecht =

American sociologist

Don Earl Albrecht
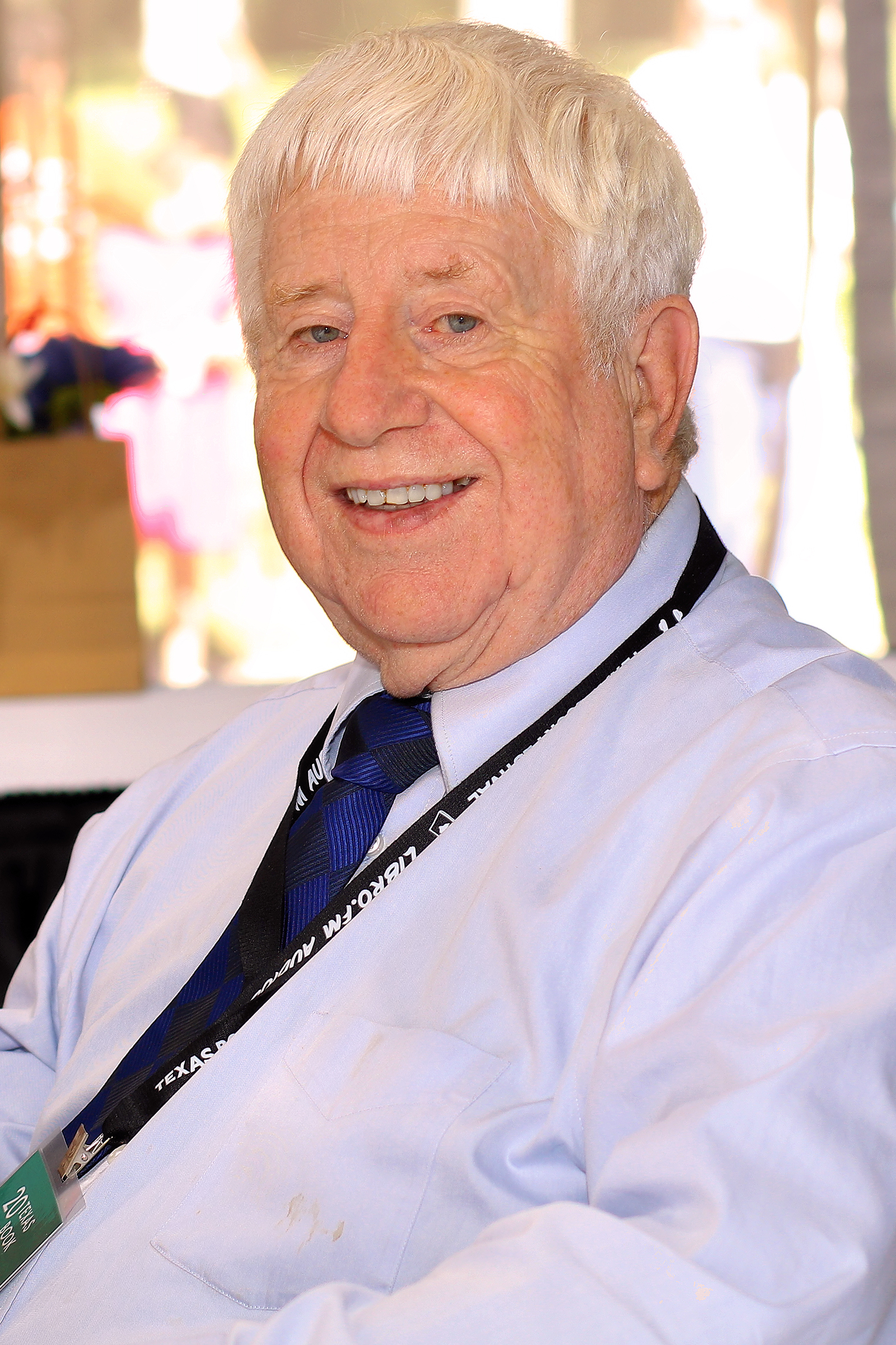
- Albrecht at the 2025 Texas Book Festival
- Born: December 8, 1952 (age 73)

Academic background
- Education: Iowa State University (Ph.D), Utah State University (B.S., M.S)

Academic work
- Discipline: Sociology
- Sub-discipline: Rural sociology
- Institutions: Texas A&M University

Don Earl Albrecht (born December 8, 1952) is director of the Western Rural Development Center, before which he was a faculty member in the Department of Recreation, Parks and Tourism Sciences at Texas A&M University for 27 years He received both his B.S. (forestry and outdoor recreation, 1976) and his M.S. (sociology, 1978) at Utah State University. In 1982 he received his Ph.D. in rural sociology at Iowa State University.

Albrecht has researched agricultural resource management, community development, rural poverty and family structure, demographic trends, education, and economic restructuring. Although most of his work is specific to the United States, Albrecht has also done research in Eastern Europe and South America.

Albrecht has served as president of the Southern Rural Sociological Society (1997) and as vice-president of the Rural Sociological Society (2001–2002). For the latter society's peer-reviewed journal, Rural Sociology, he has served twice as an associate editor (1988–1991 and 1995–1999) and as book review editor (1994–1997).

In 2000, Albrecht received the Southern Rural Sociological Society's Excellence in Research Award.

== Selected publications ==
- Albrecht, Don E., (2025) Blinded by the Lights: Texas High School Football and the Myth of Integration. Texas A&M University Press.
- Albrecht, Don E., (2007). Small town in global society. Journal of Rural Social Sciences, 22(1), 1-14.
- Albrecht, Don. E., & Albrecht, C. M. (2007). Income inequality: the implications of economic structure and social conditions. Sociological Spectrum, 27(2), 165-181.
- Albrecht, Don. E., Albrecht, C. M., & Murguia, E. (2005). Minority concentration, disadvantage, and inequality in the nonmetropolitan United States. The Sociological Quarterly, 46(3), 503-523.
- Albrecht, Don. E., (2004). Amenities, natural resources, economic restructuring, and socioeconomic outcomes in nonmetropolitan America. Community Development, 35(2), 36-52.
- Albrecht, Don. E., & Murdoch, S. H., (2002). Rural Environments and Agriculture. in R. E. Dunlap and W. Michelson (eds.) Handbook of Environmental Sociology. Greenwood Press.
- Albrecht, Don. E., Albrecht, S. E. Poverty in nonmetropolitan America: impacts of industrial, employment and family structure variables. Rural Sociology, 2000, 65(1), 87–103.
- Albrecht, Don. E., (2000). Recreational and Tourism Development vs. the Decline of Agriculture in Southern Utah. in P. V. Schaeffer and S. Loveridge (eds.) Small Town and Rural Economic Development: A Case Study Approach. Praeger.
- Albrecht, Don. E., (1999). Agricultural Development and Sustainability. in R. C. Telfair, II (ed.) Texas Wildlife Resources and Land Uses. University of Texas Press.
- Albrecht, Don. E., (1996). Family structure among urban, rural and farm populations: classic sociological theory revisited. 1996. Rural Sociology, 1996, 61(3),446–463.
- Albrecht, Don. E., & Murdock, S. H. (1990). The Sociology of US Agriculture: An Ecological Perspective. Iowa State University Press.
