= Chen Min-jen =

Taiwanese engineer, academic, and politician

- 陳明真

Member of the Legislative Yuan
- In office 1 February 2005 – 31 January 2008
- Constituency: Overseas Chinese

Personal details
- Party: Democratic Progressive
- Education: National Tsing Hua University (BS); Iowa State University (PhD)
- Scientific career
- Fields: Nuclear engineering
- Workplaces: Argonne National Laboratory; General Electric; Macromicro Technology
- Thesis: Simulation of plenum thermo-hydraulics in a liquid metal fast breeder reactor under a buoyancy-affected condition
- Doctoral advisor: Alfred Franklin Rohach

Chen Min-jen (Chinese: 陳明真) is a Taiwanese nuclear scientist and politician who served as a member of the Legislative Yuan from 2005 to 2008.

== Education ==
Chen studied nuclear engineering at National Tsing Hua University, where he graduated with a Bachelor of Science (B.S.) in the subject, and earned a Ph.D. in nuclear engineering from Iowa State University in 1983. His doctoral dissertation, completed under nuclear scientist Alfred Franklin Rohach, was titled, Simulation of Plenum Thermo-Hydraulics in a Liquid Metal Fast Breeder Reactor Under a Buoyancy-Affected Condition.

== Career ==
Chen worked for Argonne National Laboratory and General Electric before serving as president and chief executive officer of Macromicro Technology.

He served on the Legislative Yuan in Taiwan between 2005 and 2008, as a representative of overseas Chinese affiliated with the Democratic Progressive Party. As a legislator, he commented on infrastructure projects led by the National Science Council.
