= Charlotte Maria King =

Agronomist, mycologist, and botanist (1864–1937)

Charlotte Maria King (1864-1937) was a botanist, mycologist and agronomist who worked at the Iowa State College Agricultural Experiment Station.

== Written works ==
=== Articles ===
- Louis Hermann Pammel, Charlotte M. King. 1925. Some New Weeds of Iowa. Circular 98 (Iowa State College. Agricultural Experiment Station). Agric. Experiment Station, Iowa State College of Agric. & Mechanic Arts, 16 p. 1925
- King, Charlotte M. Corn stalk and corn root diseases in Iowa. Agric. Experiment Station, Iowa State College of Agric. and Mechanic Arts, 8 p. 1915
- King, Charlotte M. Four new fungous diseases in Iowa. Agric. Experiment Station, Iowa State College of Agriculture and the Mechanic Arts, 21 p. il. 1912
- King, Charlotte M. Iowa seed analyses, 1910-1913. Agric. Experiment Station, Iowa State College of Agric. & Mechanic Arts, 36 p. 1914
- King, Charlotte M. Notes on eradication of weeds with experiments made in 1907 and 1908. Agric. Experiment Station, Iowa State College of Agric. & Mechanic Arts, 35 p. 1909
- King, Charlotte M. Pollination of clover. Des Moines : Iowa Academy of Science, 10 p. il. 1911
- King, Charlotte M. Results of seed investigations for 1907. Experiment Station, Iowa State College of Agric. & Mechanic Arts, 19 p. 1908
- King, Charlotte M. Results of seed investigations for 1908 and 1909. Experiment Station, Iowa State College of Agric. & Mechanic Arts, 20 p. il. 1910
- King, Charlotte M. Seed analyses of 1913 to 1921. Agric. Experiment Station, Iowa State College of Agric. & Mechanic Arts, 15 p. 1921
- King, Charlotte M. Some plant diseases of 1908. Experiment Station, Iowa State College of Agric. & Mechanic Arts, 24 p. il. 1909
- King, Charlotte M. Studies on a fusarium disease of corn and sorghum, (preliminary). Agric. Experiment Station, Iowa State College of Agric. & Mechanic Arts, 20 p. il. 1916
- King, Charlotte M. Two barley blights, with comparison of species of Helminthosporium upon cereals. Experiment Station, Iowa State College of Agric. & Mechanic Arts, 12 p. il. 1910
- King, Charlotte M. Unlawful Iowa weeds and their extermination. Agric. Experiment Station, Iowa State College of Agric. & Mechanic Arts, 18 p. il. 1912
- King, Charlotte M. The vitality, adulteration and impurities of clover, alfalfa and timothy seed for sale in Iowa in 1906. Experiment Station, Iowa State College of Agric. & the Mechanic Arts, 69 p. il. cartas, 1907

=== Books ===
- Louis Hermann Pammel, Charlotte M. King. 1930. Honey Plants of Iowa. Bull. 7, Iowa Geological Survey. State of Iowa, 1.192 p.
- Alvin Romaine Lamb, Arthur Thomas Erwin, Charlotte Maria King, Erastus Waldon Dunnam, et al. 1924. Rural Social Survey of Hudson, Orange and Jesup Consolidated School Districts, Black Hawk and Buchanan Counties, Iowa, v. 217-230. Agric. Experiment Station, Iowa State College of Agric. & Mechanic Arts, 57 p.
