= Margaret Burchinal =

Quantitative psychologist (born 1951)

- Born: June 16, 1951 (age 75); Columbus, Ohio, U.S.
- Occupation: Quantitative psychologist

Academic background
- Education: Iowa State University; University of North Carolina, Chapel Hill

Academic work
- Institutions: University of North Carolina, Chapel Hill

Margaret R. Burchinal (born June 16, 1951, in Columbus, Ohio) is a quantitative psychologist and statistician known for her research on child care. She is senior research scientist and director of the Data Management and Analysis Center of the Frank Porter Graham Child Development Institute of the University of North Carolina at Chapel Hill.

Burchinal was lead editor of the Society for Research in Child Development monograph Quality Thresholds, Features, and Dosage in Early Care and Education: Secondary Data Analyses of Child Outcomes and co-editor of the monograph Best Practices in Quantitative Methods for Developmentalists.

== Biography ==
Burchinal graduated summa cum laude with a bachelor's degree in psychology from Iowa State University in 1976. She subsequently attended the University of North Carolina at Chapel Hill (UNCH), in which she graduated with a master's degree in special education in 1978. Her master's thesis was titled The Contingent Relationship of Mother and Infant Behaviors in Dyadic Interactions.

Burchinal obtained her PhD in quantitative psychology at UNCH in 1986. Her dissertation, titled Methods for Estimating Individual Developmental Functions was conducted under the supervision of Mark Appelbaum. This study developed growth curve statistical models to estimate individual differences in speech development in longitudinal research designs. Prior to joining the faculty of the University of North Carolina, Burchinal was professor of education at the University of California, Irvine. Her research has been supported through grants and awards from the Eunice Kennedy Shriver National Institute of Child Health and Human Development and Mathematica Policy Research Inc.

== Research ==
Burchinal's research program has investigated the impact of high quality of childhood education on children's language and cognitive development. She served as an investigator on the Abecedarian Early Intervention Project, a controlled experiment that established the benefits of early childhood education for children growing up in poverty. This study enrolled over 100 predominantly African-American children born to low income families between 1972 and 1977. Infants were randomly assigned an early education group, which received an educational intervention in a childcare setting up to age five years, or to a control group. The educational intervention used games to encourage social, emotional, and cognitive areas of development with an emphasis on language skills. Follow up studies on the children's progress at ages 12, 15, 21, and 30 years indicated long lasting benefits of early childhood education.

Burchinal has collaborated with NICHD Early Child Care Research Network on studies of the long-term effects of early child care on children's functioning from ages 4 to 12 years old. This study determined that higher quality child care from infancy to school entry was associated with higher vocabulary scores through age 12. Additionally, they found that greater exposure to center-based child care was associated with increased rates of teacher-reported externalizing behavior. Another study using this data set focused on the Black-White achievement gap observed among low income children in the United States, and found group differences to be largely explained by family, child care, and school experiences.

Burchinal and her colleagues have studied the impact of teachers' relationships with their students and the role of instructional scaffolding in supporting children's learning and development. Their research has shown how high quality relationships between preschool teachers and their students have beneficial effects on the children's academic and social skills.

== Representative publications ==
- Burchinal, M. R.; Cryer, D. (2003). "Diversity, child care quality, and developmental outcomes". Early Childhood Research Quarterly. 18 (4): 401–426. doi:10.1016/j.ecresq.2003.09.003.
- Burchinal, M. R.; Cryer, D.; Clifford, R. M.; Howes, C. (2002). "Caregiver training and classroom quality in child care centers". Applied Developmental Science. 6 (1): 2–11. doi:10.1207/s1532480xads0601_01. S2CID 144913862.
- Burchinal, M.; Howes, C.; Pianta, R.; Bryant, D.; Early, D.; Clifford, R.; Barbarin, O. (2008). "Predicting child outcomes at the end of kindergarten from the quality of pre-kindergarten teacher–child Interactions and Instruction". Applied Developmental Science. 12 (3): 140–153. doi:10.1080/10888690802199418. S2CID 144179341.
- Burchinal, M. R.; Peisner-Feinberg, E.; Pianta, R.; Howes, C. (2002). "Development of academic skills from preschool through second grade: Family and classroom predictors of developmental trajectories". Journal of School Psychology. 40 (5): 415–436. doi:10.1016/s0022-4405(02)00107-3.
- Burchinal, M. R.; Ramey, S. L.; Reid, M. K.; Jaccard, J. (1995). "Early child care experiences and their association with family and child characteristics during middle childhood". Early Childhood Research Quarterly. 10 (1): 33–61. doi:10.1016/0885-2006(95)90025-x.
- Burchinal, M. R.; Roberts, J. E.; Rhodus Riggins, J.; Zeisel, S. A.; Neebe, E.; Bryant, D. (2000). "Relating quality of center‐based child care to early cognitive and language development longitudinally". Child Development. 71 (2): 339–357. doi:10.1111/1467-8624.00149. PMID 10834469.
