= Francis de los Reyes III =

- Born: Francis Lajara de los Reyes III
- Occupations: Environmental engineer, academic and global sanitation advocate

Academic background
- Education: B.S., Agricultural Engineering; M.S., Civil Engineering; Ph.D., Environmental Engineering
- Alma mater: University of Philippines at Los Banos; Iowa State University; University of Illinois Urbana-Champaign

Francis Lajara de los Reyes III is a Filipino-American environmental engineer, academic, and global sanitation advocate. He is the Glenn E. and Phyllis J. Futrell Distinguished Professor and Alumni Distinguished Undergraduate Professor in the Department of Civil, Construction, and Environmental Engineering at North Carolina State University.

De los Reyes is most known for his research that combines modeling, bioreactor experiments, and molecular microbial ecology to address problems in environmental biotechnology and engineering, and his public outreach for improving sanitation in developing countries. His works have been published in academic journals, including Environmental Science & Technology and Applied and Environmental Microbiology. Moreover, he is the recipient of the 2022 Rudolfs Industrial Waste Management Medal from the Water Environment Federation.

== Education ==
De los Reyes completed his B.S. in Agricultural Engineering in 1990 from the University of Philippines at Los Baños followed by an M.S. in Civil Engineering in 1994 from Iowa State University. Later in 2000, he obtained a Ph.D. in Environmental Engineering from the University of Illinois Urbana-Champaign.

== Career ==
De los Reyes began his academic career at the University of the Philippines at Los Baños, where he held an instructor appointment in the Department of Land and Water Resources Engineering from 1990 to 1992. After graduate school, he joined North Carolina State University in 2000, initially as an assistant professor. He has also served as an adjunct professor at the University of the Philippines at Los Baños since 2010. Additionally, he has been an associate faculty member in the Department of Microbiology at North Carolina State University since 2004 and a professor in the Department of Civil, Construction, and Environmental Engineering since 2012. Since 2022, he has held the Glenn E. and Phyllis J. Futrell Distinguished Professorship at the same institution.

De los Reyes is a TED Fellow and WEF Fellow as well as a Board Certified Environmental Engineering Member of the American Academy of Environmental Engineers and Scientists. He was elected as a corresponding member of the National Academy of Science and Technology, Philippines (NAST PHL) for his contributions to microbial ecology, biotechnology, and environmental engineering, particularly in the Philippines. Moreover, he is an elected member of the Philippine-American Academy of Science and Engineering, where he has held leadership roles such as chair of the board and president. He also served as the founding vice president of the Filipino-American Performing Artists of North Carolina, an organization promoting Filipino culture through the arts. Additionally, he has served on the editorial boards of several academic journals, including Transactions NAST Philippines and ACS ES&T Engineering.

De los Reyes is Chair of the Board of Gawad Kalinga USA.

== Works ==
De los Reyes was part of the team that developed the vomit machine, a tool designed to study the transmission of norovirus. This invention demonstrated the airborne spread of norovirus. Furthermore, this invention was covered by media, with news articles being published in NBC News, Huffington Post and Washington Post. Furthermore, he has been an advocate for better sanitation access in underserved communities.

== Research ==
De los Reyes has worked on various topics at the intersections of waste and wastewater conversion to energy, microbial ecology, and global sanitation technologies. In 1997, he authored a paper that described the development and validation of specific oligonucleotide probes for identifying and quantifying filamentous bacteria associated with foaming in activated sludge systems, highlighting their utility in monitoring microbial populations responsible for operational issues. While investigating the role of Gordonia spp and Gordonia amarae in foam formation and stability in activated sludge systems, his 2002 study identified critical concentration thresholds and their correlation with temperature and foaming events through experimental and real-world analyses. Through his 2007 study, he developed and validated sensitive SYBR green Q-PCR assays for detecting and quantifying Bacillus atrophaeus and Serratia marcescens, surrogates for biological warfare agents, in synthetic building debris and leachate, ensuring specificity and effective spore lysis methods.

De los Reyes' 2011 work explored methanogenesis initiation in landfill waste decomposition, emphasizing Methanosarcina barkeri's importance in low pH environments. It revealed the absence of pH-neutral niches pre-methanogenesis, subsequent pH-neutral zones in high-moisture areas with M. barkeri, and spatial variability within landfill reactors. In the same year, he investigated the formation mechanisms of fats, oil, and grease (FOG) deposits in sanitary sewer lines, proposing a process involving the aggregation of excess calcium and saponification reactions with free fatty acids based on laboratory experiments and analysis of collected deposits. Subsequently, his 2012 paper explored the potential benefits and challenges of co-digesting fats, oils, and grease (FOG) with municipal biosolids in anaerobic digesters at wastewater treatment facilities, aimed at increasing biogas production while addressing issues such as inhibition of bacteria and system blockages. Furthermore, his 2013 study on anaerobic co-digestion of grease interceptor waste with biosolids showed the highest yield of methane to date.

Through his 2017 study, De los Reyes provided a thorough review of the challenges posed by fat, oil, and grease (FOG) in sewer systems, exploring the formation process of FOG deposits, sources of FOG components, potential solutions, implications for sewer maintenance, and future research directions. He also led the development of the Flexcrevator and Excrevator, auger-based technologies for emptying pit latrines that have a lot of trash. The mechanized approach made pit emptying more hygienic, safer, and faster. For this technology, he received the Patents for Humanity Award from the US Patent Office in 2020 and the RELX Environmental Challenge Award in 2018. More recently in 2021, he was part of a team that explored the potential of wastewater surveillance as a complementary tool for monitoring and responding to the COVID-19 pandemic, emphasizing advancements in detection methods, correlation with reported cases, and the need for effective communication between researchers and public health responders.

== Awards and honors ==
- 2012 – Jackson Rigney International Service Award, North Carolina State University
- 2015 – Gordon Fair Distinguished Engineering Educator Medal, Water Environment Federation
- 2017 – Dentel Award for Global Outreach, Association of Environmental Engineering and Science Professors
- 2018 – RELX Environmental Challenge Award, RELX
- 2020 – Patents for Humanity Award, US Patent Office
- 2022 – Rudolfs Industrial Waste Management Medal, Water Environment Federation
- 2022 - University of the Philippines Distinguished Alumnus Award in Science and Technology

== Selected articles ==
- de los Reyes, F. L., Ritter, W., & Raskin, L. (1997). Group-specific small-subunit rRNA hybridization probes to characterize filamentous foaming in activated sludge systems. Applied and Environmental Microbiology, 63(3), 1107–1117.
- He, X., Iasmin, M., Dean, L. O., Lappi, S. E., Ducoste, J. J., & de los Reyes III, F. L. (2011). Evidence for fat, oil, and grease (FOG) deposit formation mechanisms in sewer lines. Environmental science & technology, 45(10), 4385–4391.
- Long, J. H., Aziz, T. N., & Ducoste, J. J. (2012). Anaerobic co-digestion of fat, oil, and grease (FOG): A review of gas production and process limitations. Process Safety and Environmental Protection, 90(3), 231–245.
- Wang, L., T. N. Aziz, and F. L. de los Reyes III (2013). Determining the Limits of Anaerobic Co-Digestion of Waste Activated Sludge with Grease Interceptor Waste. Water Research, 47: 3835–3844.
- Bivins, A., North, D., Ahmad, A., Ahmed, W., Alm, E., Been, F., ... & Bibby, K. (2020). Wastewater-based epidemiology: global collaborative to maximize contributions in the fight against COVID-19.
