= Thomas Whitney (computing) =

Whitney graduated from Aurelia High School in Aurelia, Iowa in 1957, and completed BS (1961), MS (1962) and PhD (1964) degrees in electrical engineering at Iowa State University, where he was a member of Acacia fraternity.

He joined Hewlett-Packard in 1967, where he helped develop the HP-35, the first handheld electronic scientific calculator, and was a lecturer at Santa Clara University.

He later joined Apple as employee 15, and in 1978 became executive vice president of engineering, working directly with Steve Jobs and Jef Raskin on the Macintosh project.

Whitney died in 1986 at age 47.
