= Carolina Cruz-Neira =

American computer scientist and educator

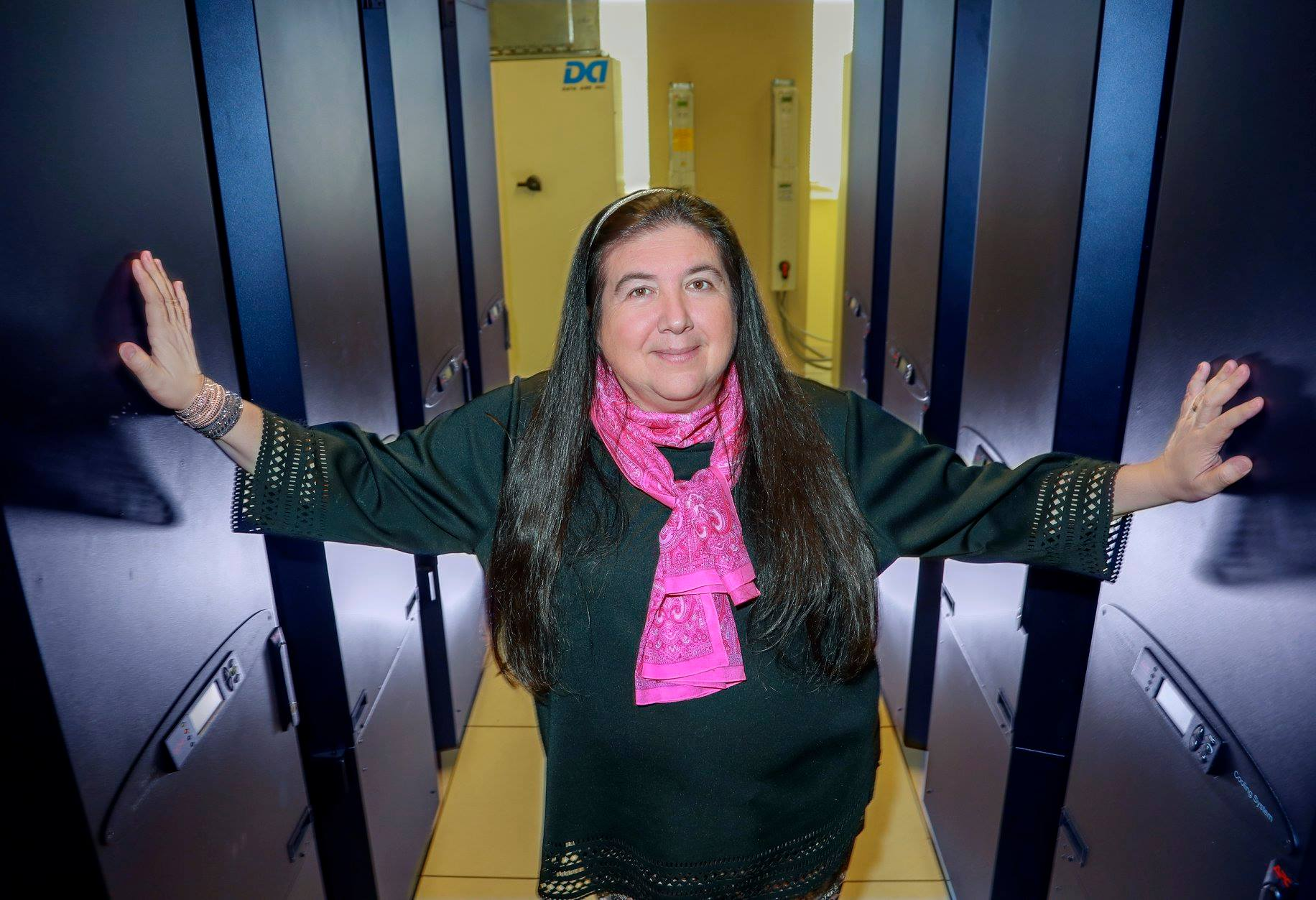
- Education: University of Illinois, Chicago; Universidad Metropolitana
- Occupations: Agere Chair in Computer Science, University of Central Florida
- Known for: Computer Science and Engineering, CAVE Automatic Virtual Environment Software frameworks for virtual reality application development:CAVELib, VRJugger, Tweek, Maestro.
- Awards: Member of the National Academy of Engineering, XR Hall of Fame, IEEE VGTC Virtual Reality Technical Achievement Award 2007, Arkansas Research Alliance Scholar

Carolina Cruz-Neira is an American computer scientist, researcher, designer, educator, and a pioneer of virtual reality (VR). She is known for inventing the cave automatic virtual environment (CAVE). She is a member of the National Academy of Engineering (NAE), Forbes Magazine 50 over 50 Innovator (2025), a fellow of the Institute of Electrical and Electronics Engineers (IEEE), a member of the IEEE VGTC Virtual Reality Academy, a XR Hall of Fame member, a Modeling & Simulation Hall of Fame member, and a Spark Star of the Museum of Discovery. She is the Interim Director of the Institute of Simulation and Training, the Executive Director of the Pegasus Research Institute, and the Agere Chair Professor at the University of Central Florida (UCF).

Her research interest are real-time visualization software frameworks, virtual environments, and applications in a range of disciplines. She is also an artist and dance producer, having staged several virtual reality and immersive live dance performances as well as museum interactive installations.

Cruz-Neira was elected a member of the National Academy of Engineering in 2018 for contributions to immersive visualization and virtual reality.

== Education ==
Cruz-Neira graduated cum laude with a degree in systems engineering and a minor in business administration from the Universidad Metropolitana in Caracas, Venezuela in 1987. She earned a master's degree in electrical engineering and computer science from the University of Illinois, Chicago in 1991, and her PhD in 1995, working under computer graphics researcher Thomas DeFanti.

Cruz-Neira pursued a degree in classical ballet dance at the Magdalena Rueda Studio and the Music Conservatory of Alicante, Spain starting at the age of 3 years old. She continued her dance education and public performances with Mary Luz Cabezos in Venezuela and later with several Chicago-based companies until a ski accident in her mid 20s broke her knee, which caused her to focus on her engineering career. She continues her passion for dance by integrating her engineering knowledge and creativity to produce and stage immersive dance performances.

== Early career ==
Before coming to the United States, Cruz-Neira worked as a software systems engineer in several companies in Venezuela, including Teleprovenca, a data center providing data services for many corporations.. One of her early projects was the design of a real-time automated system to control a hydrophonic farm. Her system monitored the status of all the plants, stations, inventory, and supply chain, accelerating the farm's operations by optimizing resource usage and cost. She also designed a visualization system to organize, retrieve and edit floor plans for new construction.

After her BS graduation in 1987 she joined the company Teleprovenca in Caracas, Venezuela, one of the largest data and computational centers in South America. She started as an intern and quickly raised to R&D lead. She developed a new language to agilize the development of enterprise large scale applications that required processing large volumes of transactions on a regular basis. She was also part of the team that developed the software architecture for the first ATM machines.

Her academic honors and her work at Teleprovenca led her to receive a Rotary International Ambassador Award, which brought her to the United States to pursue a MS degree while learning English. In this role, Cruz-Neira was stationed in Chicago as a goodwill ambassador to the US sharing the Venezuela and Spaniard culture and history.

At the completion of the Rotary Ambassador Award, Cruz-Neira received a High-Performance Computing Award, which allowed her to spend six months embedded in the leading HPC companies: Thinking Machines Corporation, IBM, and Cray Research. This experience started her interest and long career integrating HPC into real-time visual and interactive environments.

She joined IBM Wall Street in 1991 as lead visualization software architect. She developed one of the first visualization languages and visualization architectures using the IBM RISC systems. Her work on 3D multidimensional visual representations was one of the first real-time, interactive visualizations of live stock market activity for Wall Street.

== Career ==
=== Cave automatic virtual environment ===
The first CAVE was invented by Carolina Cruz-Neira, Daniel J. Sandin, and Thomas A. DeFanti in 1992. For her PhD dissertation, Cruz-Neira designed and developed the CAVE Automatic Virtual Environment, its specifications, and implementation. She also designed and implemented the CAVELib software API, now a commercial product. She was the architect of the Open Source API VR Juggler, an open source virtual reality applications development framework.

The CAVE is an immersive system that became the standard for rear projection-based virtual reality systems. The normal full system consists of projections screens along the front, side and floor axes, and a tracking system for the "user". Although they used the recursive acronym Cave Automatic Virtual Environment for the CAVE system, the name also refers to Plato's "Republic" and "The Allegory of the Cave" where he explored the concepts of reality and human perception.

There have been a couple offshoots of the CAVE technology, including ImmersaDesk, Infinity Wall and Oblong Industries' G-speak system. The ImmersaDesk is a semi-immersive system, resembling a drafting table, while the Infinity Wall is designed to cater to an entire room of people, such as a conference room. Extending this concept, G-speak supports gestural input from multiple-users and multiple-devices on an expandable array of monitors.

=== Academia ===
Video of Dr. Carolina Cruz-Neira (2016), on how virtual reality will shape the world of tomorrow

Cruz-Neira was the Stanley Chair professor in Interdisciplinary Engineering, and a co-founder of the Virtual Reality Applications Center (VRAC) at Iowa State University (ISU). In 2002, Dr. Cruz-Neira co-founded and co-directed the Human-Computer Interaction (HCI) graduate program at ISU.

She later joined the University of Louisiana at Lafayette in 2005, and in 2006, was the first CEO and Chief Scientist of LITE (Louisiana Immersive Technologies Enterprise), a Louisiana State initiative to support economic development in immersive technologies. From 2009 to 2014 she was the W. Hansen Hall and Mary Officer Hall/BORSF Endowed Super Chair in Telecommunications in Computer Engineering at the University of Louisiana at Lafayette.

In 2014, she was named an Arkansas Research Scholar by the Arkansas Research Alliance and moved to Little Rock to lead the Emerging Analytics Center (EAC) at the University of Arkansas at Little Rock.

In 2019, Cruz-Neira joined the University of Central Florida, as an Agere Chair Professor in the Computer Science Department.

At UCF she has founded the VARLab, a research group focused on innovative immersive and interactive technologies and co-founded and co-leads the UCF Digital Twin Strategic Initiative.

Many of her former students are now doing leading work in VR at places such as Unity Labs, Intel, Microsoft Research, Google, DreamWorks, EA, Deere & Company, Boeing, Sony Pictures Imageworks, and Argonne National Laboratory.

=== Other work ===
In 2017, Cruz-Neira was included in episode 8 "the player", in a ten part, Dutch documentary series, The Mind of the Universe (2017) by Robbert Dijkgraaf and VPRO broadcast.

In January, she was invited by Dell to participate in the “VR for Good” panel at the 2018 Consumer Electronics Show to demonstrate how innovators are using virtual reality to make a positive impact on society.

Since June 2019, she has served as Chief Editor of VR and Industry for Frontier's in Virtual Reality Journal.

== Awards ==
- 2007 – awarded the IEEE VGTC Virtual Reality Technical Achievement Award, in recognition of the development of the CAVE.
- 2009 – International Digital Media and Arts Association (iDMMa) awarded her the Distinguished Career Award
- 2014 – Arkansas Research Alliance Scholar
- 2016 – Polygon website's Top 25 VR Innovators award
- 2016 – University Herald websites named her one of the three greatest female innovators in virtual reality
- 2018 – In February 2018 Dr. Cruz-Neira was elected to the National Academy of Engineering.
- 2018 – Association for Computing Machinery (ACM), named Computer Pioneer.
