= My T. Thai =

American computer science engineer

- Awards: National Science Foundation CAREER Awards (2010–2015)

Academic background
- Education: BS, computer science and mathematics, 1999, Iowa State University; Ph.D., 2005, University of Minnesota
- Thesis: Energy efficiency in wireless sensor networks (2005)

Academic work
- Institutions: University of Florida
- Website: cise.ufl.edu/~mythai/

My Tra Thai is an American computer science engineer, professor in the Computer and Information Science and Engineering department at the University of Florida, and Fellow of the IEEE.

== Early life and education ==
Thai completed two bachelor's degrees in computer science and mathematics from Iowa State University in 1999 before enrolling at the University of Minnesota for her PhD.

== Career ==
Upon completing her PhD, Thai joined the University of Florida as an assistant professor and received a Young Investigator Award from the Defense Threat Reduction Agency for her project "C-WMD: Models, Complexity, and Algorithms in Complex Dynamic and Evolving Networks." She also received a National Science Foundation CAREER Awards from 2010 to 2015 for her project "Optimization Models and Approximation Algorithms for Network Vulnerability and Adaptability." In 2015, Thai became the first woman to be named a Full professor in the Computer and Information Science and Engineering department at the University of Florida. The following year, she was named a University of Florida Research Foundation Professor from 2016 to 2019.

In 2019, Thai was appointed the Associate Director of The Warren B. Nelms Institute for the Connected World. During the COVID-19 pandemic, Thai was elected a Fellow of the Institute of Electrical and Electronics Engineers for her "contributions to modeling, design, and optimization of networked systems."
