= Jalaluddin Rakhmat =

Indonesian politician (1949–2021)

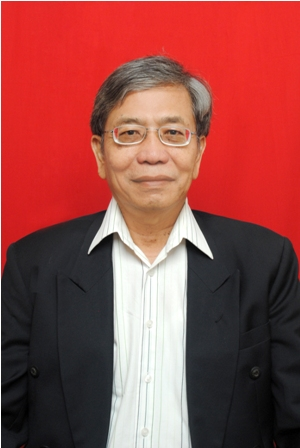

Member of the People's Representative Council
- In office 1 October 2014 – 1 October 2019

Personal details
- Born: 29 August 1949 Bandung, State of Pasundan
- Died: 15 February 2021 (aged 71) Bandung, Indonesia
- Party: PDI-P

Jalaluddin Rakhmat, also known by the nickname of Kang Jalal, (29 August 1949 – 15 February 2021) was an Indonesian academic and politician from the Indonesian Democratic Party of Struggle who became the member of the People's Representative Council from 2014 until 2019.

== Early life and education ==
Jalaluddin was born on 29 August 1949 in Bandung, the capital of the then State of Pasundan (now the Province of West Java). His father was a member of the Nahdlatul Ulama Islamic organization, while his mother was a well-known activist in the city. At the age of two, Jalaluddin's father left him and his mother due to political tensions. After his father left, his mother would bring him to study at an evening madrasa after he returned from elementary school in afternoon. His mother also taught him how to read kitab kuning every night. Despite his religious family background, Jalaluddin only received religious education until he graduated from elementary school.

Jalaluddin was a keen reader and he often found himself spending time to read the works of philosophers such as Spinoza and Nietzsche in his father's library. His father also left Arabic religious books in his house, which Jalaluddin also read. According to Tajus Syarofi, after reading The Revival of the Religious Sciences, Jalaluddin became shaken and almost went insane, that he left his high school—the State High School Bandung 02—and wandered off to several pesantrens in West Java. However, due to the lack of supplies brought by him, pesantrens refused him and he went back to study at his high school. During his time in the high school, Jalal joined the Persatuan Islam, an Islamic student organization.

Jalaluddin then attended the Padjajaran University and earned a degree in mass communications (Drs.). After his graduation from the university, he worked as a lecturer in his alma mater. His job as a university lecturer allowed him to receive scholarships from the Iowa State University, where he took communications and psychology. In an interview, Jalaluddin remarked that he learned more from reading the books in the university's library rather than listening to lecture. Jalaluddin later graduated from the university in 1981 with a cum laude score of 4.0, thus allowing him to be a member of the Phi Kappa Phi and Sigma Delta Chi honorary society in the university.

Jalaluddin later pursued further higher education in Australia, earning him a doctorate in political science from the Australian National University.

== Academic career ==
After graduating from Iowa State University, Jalaluddin returned to Indonesia and wrote a book titled Psikologi Komunikasi (Psychology Communications). He designed the curriculum for his faculty in the Padjajaran University and gave lectures on various subjects, including Indonesia's political system. He also gave lectures on other universities and institutes, such as at the Bandung Institute of Technology and at the Bandung State Islamic Institute. Jalaluddin was involved in the establishment of the Jamaah Ahlulbait Indonesia, a Shia Muslim organization, in July 2000.

In 2014, Rakhmat was turned in to police in Makassar by the Islamic Research and Assessment Institution (Lembaga Penelitian Dan Pengkajian Islam) for obtaining a false doctorate and master's degree, as he did not approve the degrees with the Ministry of Education and Culture despite the fact that they were earned outside Indonesia. However, the Honorary Council of the People's Representative Council dismissed the cases.

== Political career ==
Jalaluddin was a member of the Indonesian Democratic Party of Struggle (PDIP). According to Jalaluddin, PDIP was the only party that defended minorities. Jalaluddin then ran as a candidate from West Java's 2nd electoral district in the 2014 Indonesian legislative election. Jalaluddin secured a seat in the People's Representative Council with 56,402 votes. He assumed office on 1 October 2014.

Jalaluddin was seated in the Commission VIII of the council, which handles religion, social affairs, and the empowerment of women. Jalaluddin remarked that he would defend minorities such as Shia Muslims and Christians during his tenure in the commission.

== Death ==
Jalaluddin Rakhmat died of COVID-19 in Bandung, at 15.45 on 15 February 2021, at the age of 71. Prior to his death, Jalaluddin suffered from coughing and fever symptoms. Jalaluddin was buried on the same day at the Rancaekek cemetery.

== Personal life ==
Jalaluddin Rakhmat was a Shia. Jalaluddin was married to Euis Kartini. Euis died on 11 February 2021, four days before Jalaluddin's death.

== Bibliography ==
- Syarofi, Tajus (2010). Studi Analisis Pemikiran Jalaluddin Rahmat tentang Social Engineering dan Relevansinya dengan Tujuan Pendidikan Islam (Undergraduate Thesis). IAIN Walisongo. Archived from the original on 12 May 2015.
