= Rose Mwonya =

Kenyan academic

Prof Rose A. Mwonya was appointed vice-chancellor (VC) of Egerton University in 2015, becoming the first woman to hold the position in the institution's 76-year history. She served in this role for five years, until 2021. Mwonya was one of 21 applicants for the position, and was selected after a rigorous selection process. She is a highly accomplished academic, with a PhD in Agriculture and Home Economics from Iowa State University. She has held a number of senior positions at Egerton University, including dean of students and deputy VC in charge of academics. As VC, Mwonya advocated for gender equality and women's empowerment. She also worked to improve the quality of education at Egerton University, and to increase its internationalization.

== Early life and education ==
Rose was born in a village in Kenya in 1941. She's the firstborn child in her family, and her father was a driver to a Government officer. Rose attended Ndenga Primary School until Class 4, when she was transferred to Asumbi Girls boarding school in Homa Bay county. After Asumbi, she attended Nyabururu Girls in Kisii before attending Embu Institute of Agriculture. Rose then went on to earn a diploma in Agriculture and Home Economics from Egerton University (then still operating under the University of Nairobi). In 1982, she was awarded a scholarship by the United States Agency for International Development (USAID) to attend Iowa State University, where she earned a Bachelor of Science degree in agriculture. She then went on to earn a Master of Science and PhD in Home Economics from the same university.

== Career ==
Rose Mwonya after graduating from Embu Institute of Agriculture, worked at the Ministry of Agriculture. She then served as the District Home Economics Officer at Kakamega District, a position she obtained after completing a diploma course at Egerton University, she was hired by Bukura Institute of Agriculture in Western Province. She joined Egerton University in 1987 as a lecturer. She served in various capacities before becoming vice-chancellor (VC), including founding director of the Center for Women Studies and Gender Analysis and chair of the department of Agriculture and Home Economics. In 2007, she was appointed dean of students and the following year became deputy VC in charge of academics. She served in this role until her appointment as VC in 2015. She took office in January 2016 and vowed to curb exam cheating. However, she faced a number of challenges towards the end of her term and was unable to renew her tenure. The university attempted to send her on terminal leave after she was accused of gross misconduct. She was accused of losing millions of shillings through procurement malpractices and interfering with student records. The university sent her on a 90-day compulsory leave in September 2018. She challenged the decision in court and was cleared of wrongdoing. She was reinstated the following month. In 2000, Mwonya was appointed as the vice-chancellor of Egerton University. She was the first woman to be appointed as the vice-chancellor of Egerton University. Mwonya served as the vice-chancellor for six years, during which time she oversaw the university's expansion and improvement. She also helped to raise the university's profile both nationally and internationally. The university again sent her on terminal leave, but she challenged this decision in court and was reinstated. She finally left the university in January 2021, paving the way for Isaac Kibwage to become VC.

== Awards and recognition ==
Mwonya has received numerous awards and recognition for her work in education and agriculture. In 2004, she was awarded the Order of the Grand Warrior of Kenya by the Kenyan government. She was also awarded the International Association of Agricultural Economists' Award for Outstanding Contribution to Agricultural Economics in 2006. In 2010, she was awarded the Outstanding African Woman in Agriculture Award by the African Union, The World Bank's Gender Champion Award Notable achievements of Rose Mwonya; She is the founding director of the Centre for Women Studies and Gender Analysis at Egerton University, and author of several books and articles on agriculture and gender. A member of the board of directors of several organizations, including the Kenya National Commission on Human Rights and the Kenya Women's Parliamentary Caucus.
