= Yong Chin Pak =

South Korea taekwondo practitioner

- Style: Hapkido; Taekwondo; Judo
- Rank: 9th Dan Hapkido; 8th Dan Taekwondo; 6th Dan Judo

Other information
- Website: http://www.public.iastate.edu/~ycpak/

Yong Chin Pak is a 6th dan judo, 9th dan hapkido, and 8th dan taekwondo master and adjunct instructor in Exercise Sport Science and instructed students in the martial arts (hapkido, judo, and taekwondo) at Iowa State University from 1973 to 2013. He graduated from Yongin University with a Bachelor of Science in Physical Education and was President of the National Collegiate Taekwondo Association from 1986 to 2007.

Under Pak's guidance, the Iowa State Tae Kwon Do Club (previously coined the Karate Club due to the presence of a different taekwondo club already in existence on campus) has won multiple national collegiate championships. Pak has also coached in both the Pan-Am and Goodwill Games. He has also authored a textbook, Tae Kwon Do.

The April 2021 edition of Tae Kwon Do Life Magazine featured the life and contributions of Grandmaster Pak as its international cover story.
