= Emil Steinberger (endocrinologist) =

Endocrinologist (1928–2008)

- Born: December 20, 1929; Berlin, Germany
- Died: October 12, 2008 (aged 79); Houston, United States
- Occupation: endocrinologist

Emil Steinberger (December 20, 1928 – October 12, 2008) was an American endocrinologist and founding president of the American Society of Andrology.

== Early life ==
Steinberger was born in Berlin, Germany, and grew up in Trzebinia, Poland. In 1939 he fled with his family to Soviet territory, where they spent two years imprisoned in the Gulag Nuziyary and later settled in Kazakhstan.

== Education ==
He began medical studies which he later continued in Frankfurt am Main and, following emigration to the United States in 1948, at Iowa University.

His medical degree was gained in 1955.

== Career ==
Steinberger then volunteered for a two years service as a senior medical research officer at the National Naval Medical Center.

Following a training at Wayne State University Medical School, from 1965 to 1971 he chaired the Department of Endocrinology and Human Reproduction at the Einstein Medical Center in Philadelphia. In 1971 he moved to Houston, Texas, to assume the position of chairman of the Department of Reproductive Medicine and Reproductive Biology at the newly created McGovern Medical School at the University of Texas Health Science Center at Houston. In 1974 Steinberger was a founding member of the American Society of Andrology and was its first president until 1977.

His research focused on the hormonal control of spermatogenesis. He performed pioneering work in many aspects of sperm function, fertility preservation, physical and chemical gonadotoxic agents, as well as in the endocrine treatment of women with ovulatory dysfunction. Continuing to work in academia, he worked at the University of Texas Health Science Center at Houston until 1984, when he left to establish the Texas Institute for Reproductive Medicine and Endocrinology. He published more than 400 medical research papers and trained more than 50 postdoctoral fellows from the United States and abroad.

After retiring from active medical practice in 2001, he also published two autobiographical books and published a column in the Jewish Herald-Voice. Together with his wife Anna he is the founder of the Steinberger Endowment Fund for Docent Education and the Steinberger Fund at the Houston Holocaust Museum.

Steinberger was honored with the Cody award, presented annually by the Retired Physicians Organization to a retired physician for contributing to the arts and literature. He died of lung cancer in 2008.
