= Virtual Reality Applications Center =

Research center in the United States

The Virtual Reality Applications Center (VRAC) is a research center within the Engineering Teaching and Research Complex (ETRC) at Iowa State University (ISU) and is involved in advanced research of virtual reality (VR), augmented reality (AR), human computer interaction (HCI), visualization, and is home to the world's highest resolution immersive virtual reality facility, known as the C6.

== Origins of VRAC ==
VRAC began in 1990 as the Iowa Center for Emerging Manufacturing Technology (ICEMT) under the directorship of Dr. James Bernard, a faculty member in the Mechanical Engineering department. ICEMT was established within the Institute for Physical Research and Technology, a network of research and technology-transfer centers and industrial-outreach programs at Iowa State University. In 1992 ICEMT received its first VR-focused grant, a three-year project from the Office of Naval Research, focused on virtual reality applications for manufacturing. In 1994 ICEMT began virtual prototyping research for John Deere, which remains VRAC's longest continuous industrial relationship.

ICEMT constructed its first VR facility, a 12'x12' CAVE-like structure named the C2, in 1996 under the supervision of Dr. Carolina Cruz-Neira, inventor of the CAVE and the ICEMT Associate Director. Starting in November 1999 ICEMT changed its name to the Virtual Reality Applications Center, moved into the newly constructed Engineering Teaching and Research Complex (ETRC) and started construction on a new VR facility known as the C6. In June 2000 the C6 officially opened as the world's first fully immersive 6-sided virtual reality facility with all wireless tracking, navigation, and control systems, and the first such system located in the United States.

In 2003 VRAC expanded its mission by creating an interdepartmental graduate program known as Human Computer Interaction (HCI). In 2004 Dr. James Oliver, a faculty member in Mechanical Engineering, began his tenure as the VRAC Director. A technology refresh of the C6 in 2006 put the facility on the map as the highest resolution immersive environment of its kind with over 100 million pixels.

== History of 6-sided visualization facilities ==
September, 1998

COSMOS at Gifu Prefectural Science & Technology Promotion Center, in "Techno-Plaza" of VR Techno in Kakamigahara City, Gifu prefecture, Japan (north of Nagoya).
"photos of COSMOS"

October 23, 1998

"VR-CUBE" at Center for Parallel Computers (PDC) at the Royal Institute of Technology (KTH) in Stockholm, Sweden.

August, 1999

"Six sided CAVE" at VR-Center Nord at Aalborg University in Aalborg, Denmark.

June 19, 2000

C6 at the Virtual Reality Applications Center (VRAC) at Iowa State University in Ames, IA, USA.

November 2001

Adaptive Laboratory for Immersive Cognitive Experiments (ALICE) at the University of Illinois Urbana-Champaign Beckman Institute.
