= Robert E. Kowalski =

American medical journalist and best-selling author

Robert E. Kowalski (1942–2007) was a noted American medical journalist and best-selling author.

Kowalski came to national prominence in 1987 with the publication of his New York Times best-selling book - On the list for a record-breaking 115 weeks - "The 8-Week Cholesterol Cure". An updated and revised - "The NEW 8-Week Cholesterol Cure" was published in 2002/2003. Kowalski also wrote "The 8-Week Cholesterol Cure Cookbook", "Cholesterol & Children", "8 Steps to a Healthy Heart (a guide to recovery from heart attack and bypass surgery)", "The Type II Diabetes Diet Book", and "The Blood Pressure Cure: 8 Weeks to Lower Blood Pressure Without Prescription Drugs".

Kowalski was 35 when he suffered a major heart attack and multiple-bypass surgery. He had inherited the tendency for heart disease from his father, who died too young several years before. At that time, surgery was considered the only solution. Within six years, Kowalski was back on the operating table for another set of bypasses, following yet another major heart attack.

He used his medical and journalist training to find the solution to saving his own life. The result was a heart-health program which he practiced and popularized in his books, centered on megavitamin doses of niacin and lifestyle changes. He was a pioneer advocate for quitting smoking, reducing saturated fat and cholesterol, increasing moderate exercise, and adding oat bran and fish oil to a heart-healthy diet.

Kowalski received his education at Iowa State University, where he was a dual major in biology-chemistry. He received his bachelor's in journalism, then a master's in journalism and physiology. He also completed the course work for a doctorate in physiology at Iowa State but did not finish his dissertation for the degree.

Kowalski died November 9, 2007, in Washington, DC at the age of 65 from a pulmonary embolism.
