= Carol Wilson (soprano) =

American operatic soprano

Carol Wilson is an American operatic soprano and, from 1998, a principal artist at the Deutsche Oper am Rhein. In 2012 she became associate professor of voice at the University of North Texas.

Wilson attended Iowa State University and received Doctor of Musical Arts degree from Yale School of Music. Wilson has played several roles, including Agathe in Der Freischütz, Alice Ford in Falstaff, and the Countess in Capriccio.

As a guest artist, Wilson has performed at the Caramoor Festival, the Connecticut Early Music Festival (Elisa in Il re pastore), Oper Frankfurt (Eva), the Royal Swedish Opera (Marie/Marietta in Die tote Stadt), and the Savonlinna Opera Festival (Eva). She has also performed in concerts with the American Symphony Orchestra, the Boston Masterworks Chorale, and the Brooklyn Philharmonic (concert performances of Violetta in La Traviata and Micaela in Carmen).
