= Ames Project =

Subproject of the Manhattan project

The Ames Project was a research and development project that was part of the larger Manhattan Project to build the first atomic bombs during World War II. It was founded by Frank Spedding from Iowa State College in Ames, Iowa as an offshoot of the Metallurgical Laboratory at the University of Chicago devoted to chemistry and metallurgy, but became a separate project in its own right. The Ames Project developed the Ames Process, a method for preparing pure uranium metal that the Manhattan Project needed for its atomic bombs and nuclear reactors. Between 1942 and 1945, it produced over 1,000 short tons (910 t) of uranium metal. It also developed methods of preparing and casting thorium, cerium and beryllium. In October 1945 Iowa State College received the Army-Navy "E" Award for Excellence in Production, an award usually only given to industrial organizations. In 1947 it became the Ames Laboratory, a national laboratory under the Atomic Energy Commission.

== Background ==
The discovery of the neutron by James Chadwick in 1932, followed by that of nuclear fission by German chemists Otto Hahn and Fritz Strassmann in 1938, and its theoretical explanation (and naming) by Lise Meitner and Otto Frisch soon after, opened up the possibility of a controlled nuclear chain reaction with uranium. On 20 December 1941, soon after the Japanese attack on Pearl Harbor that brought the United States into World War II, the Nobel Prize-winning physicist Arthur H. Compton was placed in charge of the plutonium project, the objective of which was to produce reactors to convert uranium into plutonium, to find ways to chemically separate plutonium from the uranium, and ultimately to design and build an atomic bomb. This became the Manhattan Project. Although a successful reactor had not yet been built, the scientists had already produced several different but promising design concepts.

Compton established the project's Metallurgical Laboratory at the University of Chicago in February 1942. Its mission was to build nuclear reactors to create plutonium that would be used in atomic bombs. For advice on assembling the laboratory's Chemistry Division, Compton, a physicist, turned to Herbert McCoy, who had considerable experience with isotopes and radioactive elements. McCoy recommended Frank Spedding from Iowa State College in Ames, Iowa, as an expert on the rare-earth elements, which were chemically similar to the actinide series that included uranium and plutonium. Compton asked Spedding to become the head of the Metallurgical Laboratory's Chemistry Division.

Owing to a lack of space at the University of Chicago, Spedding proposed to organize part of the Chemistry Division at Iowa State College, where he had colleagues who were willing to help. It was agreed that Spedding would spend half of each week in Ames, and half in Chicago. The intention was that staff at Ames would eventually move to Chicago when space became available, but this never happened. The success of the Ames Project ensured that it became a separate laboratory within the Manhattan Project.

== Organization ==
Spedding started by recruiting two fellow scientists at Iowa State College to become his associate directors; Harley A. Wilhelm, an expert in spectrochemistry and metallurgy, as the head of the Ames Project's Metallurgy Division, and Iral B. Johns as the head of the Plutonium Division. Under them were eight section chiefs. The Ames Project grew to over 90 scientific staff. The total number of staff eventually exceeded 500. Senior staff would meet on Sunday mornings to review the previous week's work and set goals for the week ahead, a process that came to be called "Speddinars". At first Spedding had to depart for Chicago soon after each meeting, but in early 1943 he was succeeded as head of the chemistry division at the Metallurgical Laboratory by James Franck, allowing Spedding to spend more time at Ames. He remained an associate director at the Metallurgical Laboratory.

Spedding was fortunate in having the full support of Charles E. Friley, the president of Iowa State College, even though the nature of the work could not at first be disclosed to him while security checks were being undertaken. Once these were completed, Friley brought in Harold V. Gaskill, the dean of science, as the Ames Project's administrator. The United States Army Corps of Engineers took control of the Manhattan Project in June 1942, and the Ames Project in late 1942.

== Uranium ==
=== Ames Process ===
The first item on the agenda was to find uranium for the nuclear reactor that Enrico Fermi was proposing to build. Uranium ore was readily available. Some 1,200 short tons (1,100 t) of high-grade ore from the Belgian Congo was in storage in a warehouse at Port Richmond on Staten Island. About 300 short tons (270 t) per annum was being mined at the Eldorado Mine at Port Radium on the Great Bear Lake near the Arctic Circle in Canada's Northwest Territories. The Eldorado company also operated a refinery at Port Hope, Ontario, where Canadian and Belgian ore was refined. The Manhattan Project's estimated requirements for 1942 were 200 short tons (180 t), of which Compton required just 45 short tons (41 t) for his proposed nuclear reactor.

The major problem was impurities in the uranium oxide, which could act as neutron poisons and prevent a nuclear chain reaction. Due to the presence of impurities, references published before 1942 typically listed its melting point at around 1,700 °C (3,090 °F) when pure uranium metal actually melts at 1,132 °C (2,070 °F). Peter P. Alexander, at Metal Hydrides Incorporated, gave in 1938 the first indications that the melting point of uranium was "as low as 1,100 °C (2,010 °F) and even somewhat lower".

The most effective way to purify uranium oxide in a laboratory was to take advantage of the fact that uranium nitrate is soluble in ether. Scaling this process up for industrial production was a dangerous proposition; ether was explosive, and a factory using large quantities was likely to blow up or burn down. Compton and Spedding turned to Mallinckrodt in St. Louis, Missouri, which had experience with ether. Spedding went over the details with Mallinckrodt's chemical engineers, Henry V. Farr and John R. Ruhoff, on 17 April 1942. Within a few months, sixty tons of highly pure uranium oxide was produced.

The only uranium metal available commercially was produced by the Westinghouse Electric and Manufacturing Company, using a photochemical process. Uranium oxide was reacted with potassium fluoride in large vats on the roof of Westinghouse's plant in Bloomfield, New Jersey. This produced ingots the size of a quarter that were sold for around $20 per gram. But Edward Creutz, the head of the Metallurgical Laboratory's group responsible for fabricating the uranium, wanted a metal sphere the size of an orange for his experiments. With Westinghouse's process, it would have cost $200,000 and taken a year to produce. The hydride or "hydramet" process, developed by Alexander used calcium hydride as the reducing agent for the conversion of uranium ore to metal. By this means the Metal Hydrides plant in Beverly, Massachusetts, managed to produce a few pounds of uranium metal. Unfortunately, the calcium hydride contained unacceptable amounts of boron, a neutron poison, making the metal unsuitable for use in a reactor. Some months would pass before Clement J. Rodden from the National Bureau of Standards and Union Carbide figured out a means to produce sufficiently pure calcium hydride.

Spedding and Wilhelm began looking for ways to create the uranium metal. At the time, it was produced in the form of a powder, and was highly pyrophoric. It could be pressed and sintered and stored in cans, but to be useful, it needed to be melted and cast. Casting presented difficulty because uranium corroded crucibles of beryllium, magnesia and graphite. To produce uranium metal, they tried reducing uranium oxide with hydrogen, but this did not work. While most of the neighboring elements on the periodic table can be reduced to form pure metal and slag, uranium did not behave this way. In June 1942 they then tried reducing the uranium with carbon in a hydrogen atmosphere, with only moderate success. They then tried aluminum, magnesium and calcium, all of which were unsuccessful. The following month the Ames team found that molten uranium could be cast in a graphite container. Although graphite was known to react with uranium, this could be managed because the carbide formed only where the two touched.

Around this time, someone from the Manhattan Project's Berkeley Radiation Laboratory brought a 2-inch (51 mm) cube of uranium tetrafluoride—the uranium compound being used in the calutrons—to the Metallurgical Laboratory to discuss the possibility of using it rather than uranium oxide in the reactor. Spedding began wondering whether it would be possible to produce uranium metal from this salt, bypassing the problems with oxygen. He took the cube back to Ames, and asked Wilhelm to investigate. The task was assigned to an associate, Wayne H. Keller. He investigated a process (now known as the Ames process) originally developed by J. C. Goggins and others at the University of New Hampshire in 1926. This involved mixing uranium tetrachloride (from which Eugène-Melchior Péligot first prepared pure uranium by reduction with potassium in 1841) and calcium metal in a calcium oxide-lined steel pressure vessel (known as a "bomb") and heating it. Keller was able to reproduce Goggin's results on 3 August 1942, creating a 20-gram (0.71 oz) button of very pure uranium metal. The process was then scaled up. By September, bombs were being prepared in 4-inch (10 cm) steel pipes 15 inches (38 cm) long, lined with lime to prevent corrosion, and containing up to 3 kilograms (6.6 lb) of uranium tetrafluoride. C. F. Gray took these ingots and cast them into a 4,980-gram (10.98 lb) 5-by-2-inch (12.7 by 5.1 cm) billet of pure uranium.

Uranium refining at Ames
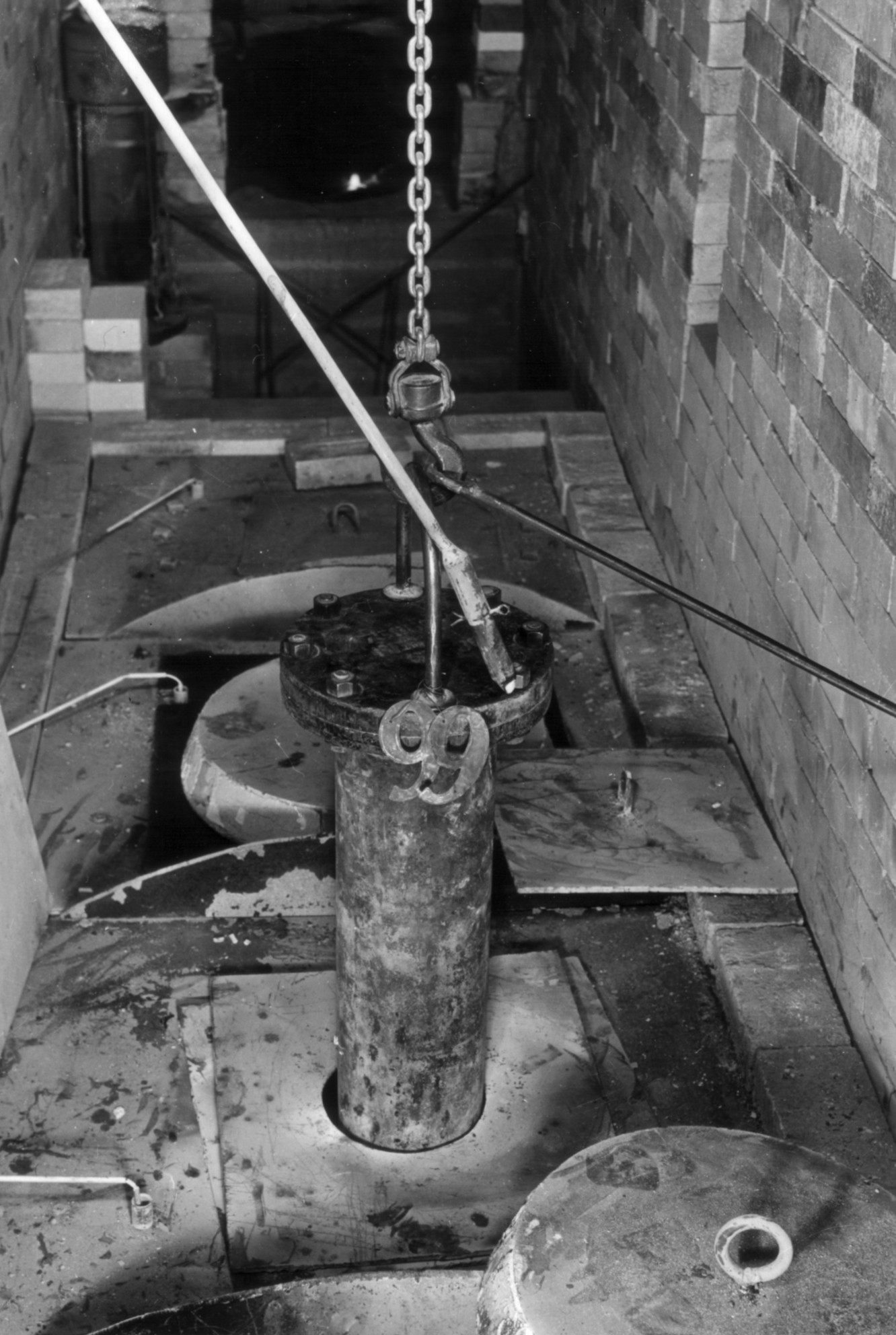
A "bomb" (pressure vessel) containing uranium halide and sacrificial metal, probably magnesium, being lowered into a furnace

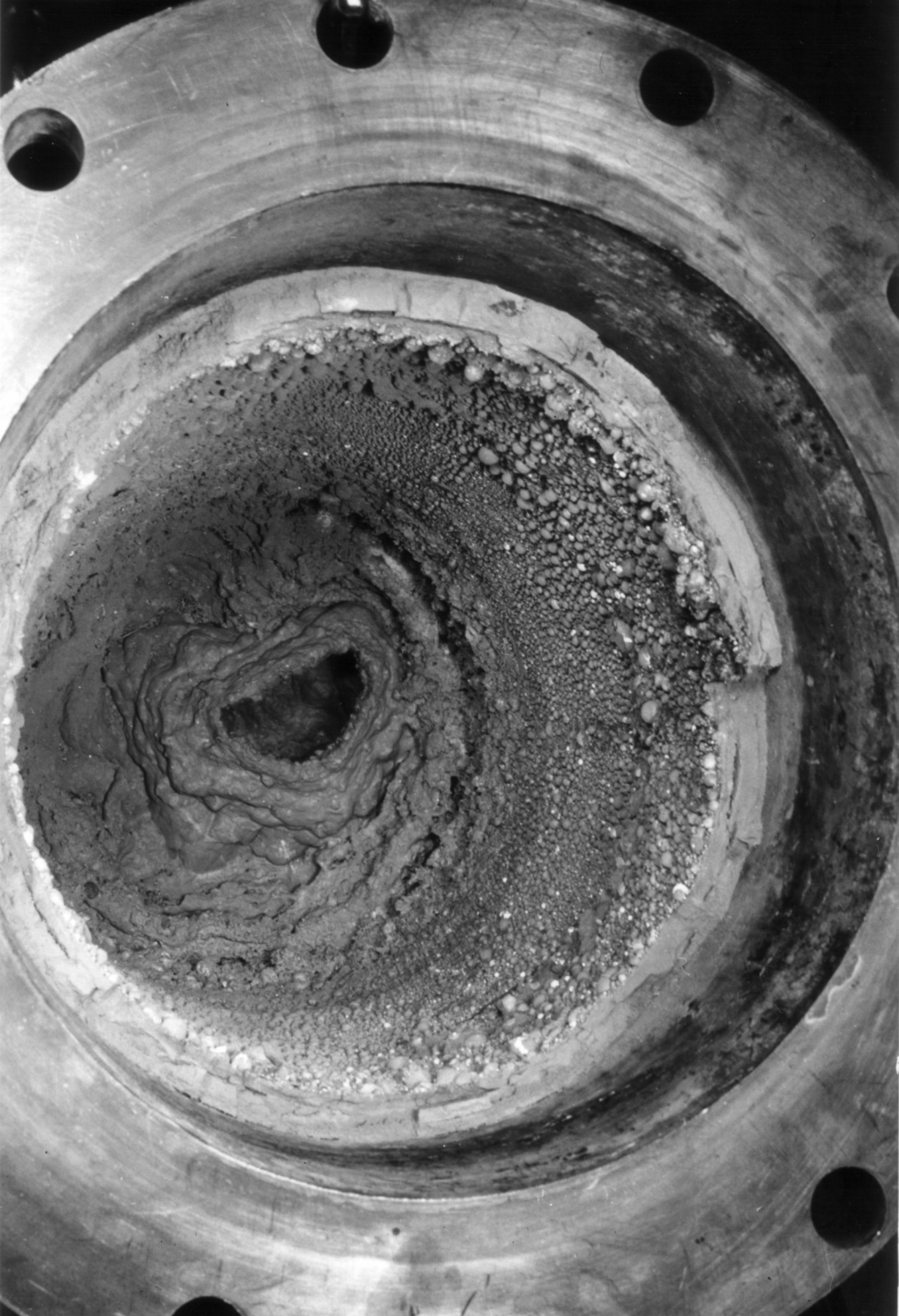
After the reaction, remnant slag coats the interior of a bomb.

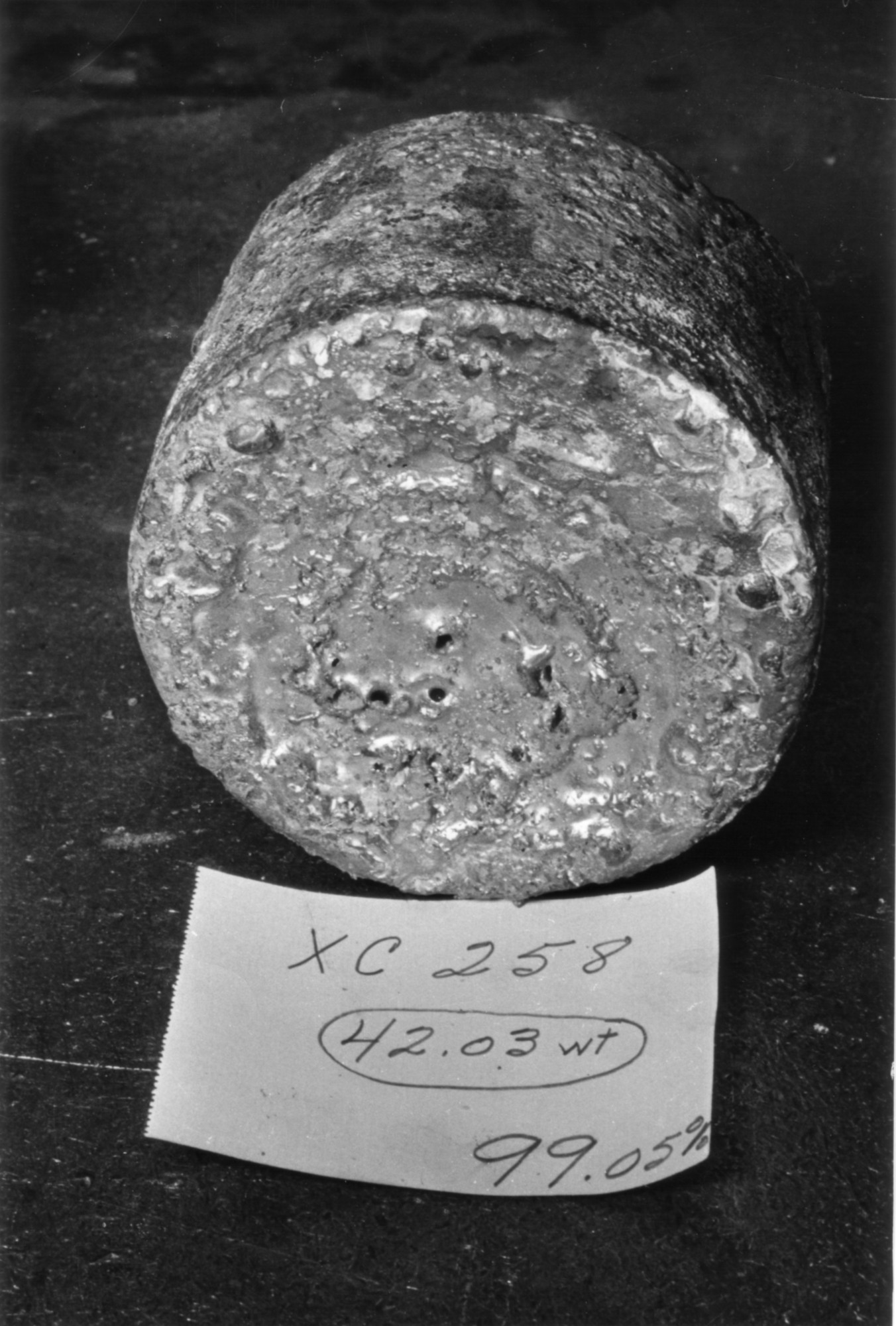
A uranium metal "biscuit" from the reduction reaction

=== Production ===
On 24 September 1942, Wilhelm took the ingot to Spedding at the Metallurgical Laboratory in Chicago and presented it to Compton, whose first reaction was of disbelief. He thought it must be hollow. Spedding had the ingot cut open. It was not hollow. A few days later, the Metallurgical Laboratory's director, Richard L. Doan, went to Ames, where he drew up an Office of Scientific Research and Development (OSRD) contract for the Ames Project to produce 100 pounds (45 kg) of pure uranium metal a day. This would be a pilot plant, with the process eventually being transferred to industry. The OSRD contract was superseded by a Manhattan Project contract in November 1942. The initial contract was for $50,000. By 31 December 1945, the face value of contracts let to the Ames Project totaled $6.907 million; but the work was carried out for $4 million.

Wilhelm found an old wooden building on the southeastern edge of the campus. It had been a home economics building until 1926, and then had served as a women's gymnasium until a new one was built in 1941; by 1942 it was mainly used for storage. The building was handed over to the Ames Project, and the wooden floor replaced with a concrete one, much to the disappointment of the university architect, who had been trying for some years to get the place torn down. The building officially became known as the Physical Chemistry Annex; local people called it "Little Ankeny", after the nearby town of Ankeny, Iowa, where there was an ordnance plant. Looking for machine tools, Wilhelm found a machine shop for sale in Ames. The owner, Bill Maitland, had once made gardening tools, but could no longer obtain the metal he needed due to wartime rationing. Wilhelm bought it for $8,000. The Metallurgical Laboratory supplied two large 40-kilowatt reduction furnaces.

The Ames Project supplied two tons of uranium metal to the Metallurgical Laboratory for the construction of Chicago Pile-1, the world's first nuclear reactor, which achieved criticality on 2 December 1942. The Ames Project would later supply over 90 percent of the uranium for the X-10 Graphite Reactor at the Clinton Engineer Works in Oak Ridge, Tennessee. Production rose from 100 pounds (45 kg) of uranium metal per day in December 1942 to 550 pounds (250 kg) per day by the middle of January 1943.

For production, the process was changed to use magnesium instead of calcium; magnesium was cheaper, more readily available, and purer. But it was also harder to start the reaction with magnesium than calcium, requiring more heating. The uranium tetrafluoride, known as green salt because of its characteristic color, was supplied by Mallinckrodt, DuPont and Harshaw Chemical, and was ground up on arrival, as was the magnesium. Bombs were normally 6-inch (15 cm) pipes, 36-inch (91 cm) long, although 10-inch (25 cm) pipes, 42-inch (110 cm) long, could be used to produce 125-pound (57 kg) ingots. They were heated to 650 °C (1,202 °F) for 40 to 60 minutes, after which the mixture spontaneously reacted, reaching temperatures of 1,500 to 2,000 °C (2,730 to 3,630 °F). A microphone was used to detect the ignition, and the bomb would be moved to a spray chamber to cool. If everything worked, uranium metal biscuit and magnesium fluoride slag would be produced. After the bomb cooled, it would be opened and hammered until the two separated. The resulting biscuit would be stamped, and sent off to be cast.

Casting re-shaped the uranium into ingots and removed impurities. The metal biscuits were melted in a graphite crucible and poured into a mold. This produced rods between 1.5 and 5.0 inches (3.8 and 12.7 cm) in diameter and 20 to 30 inches (51 to 76 cm) long. The rods were stamped with a number and placed in wooden boxes for shipping to the Metallurgical Laboratory. From there they were sent to the Oak Ridge or the Hanford Site. By July 1943, the Ames Project was producing 130,000 pounds (59,000 kg) of uranium metal per month. The cost of a pound of uranium metal fell from $1,000 to around one dollar. Starting in July 1943, Mallinckrodt, Electromet, and DuPont began producing uranium by the Ames process, and Ames phased out its own production by early 1945.

The Ames Project began a program of recovering uranium metal from scrap. A new building, known as Physical Chemistry Annex 2, was constructed for the purpose in 1944. Uranium turnings were washed, dried, passed through a magnet to remove iron impurities, and pressed into briquettes. They were then sent to be remelted. The job was handed over to Metal Hydrides and a recovery plant at the Hanford Site in December 1945, by which time the Ames Project had recovered 600,000 pounds (270 t) of scrap metal. In all, the Ames Project produced over 1,000 short tons (910 t) of uranium metal. All production ceased on 5 August 1945, as did that at Metal Hydrides and DuPont, leaving Mallinckrodt as the only producer of uranium metal in the early post-war period.

== Other metals ==
Beginning in 1942, along with uranium production operations, the Ames Project conducted a variety of metallurgical research related to the separation and purification of thorium, beryllium and rare-earth metals, such as cerium.

=== Thorium ===
In 1942, Glenn T. Seaborg established that when thorium was bombarded with neutrons, it could be transformed into fissile uranium-233. This was another possible route to an atomic bomb, especially if it turned out that uranium-233 could be more easily separated from thorium than plutonium from uranium. It was not pursued further because uranium-233 production would have required a complete redesign of the Hanford reactors; but in April 1944 the Metallurgical Laboratory's Thorfin R. Rogness calculated that a nuclear reactor containing thorium could produce enough uranium-233 to sustain its reaction without adding anything but more thorium. This was very interesting, because at the time it was thought that uranium might be scarce, whereas thorium was at least ten times more plentiful.

In July and August 1943, the Ames Project attempted to create thorium metal using something similar to the Ames Process. This was unsuccessful, because thorium has a much higher melting point than uranium. Efforts continued into 1944, and it was found that with a zinc chloride booster they could produce a zinc-thorium alloy. Heating to 1,300 °C (2,370 °F) in a graphite crucible could then melt the zinc, which could be drawn off. This left the thorium, which was cast into 150-pound (68 kg) ingots in beryllia crucibles. Some 4,500 pounds (2,000 kg) was produced by 31 December 1945. Thorium sold for $3 a gram before the war; by its end, the Ames Project was producing it for less than 5¢ a gram.

=== Beryllium ===
Beryllium was used by the Manhattan Project as a neutron reflector, and as a component of modulated neutron initiators. Only one firm produced it commercially in the United States, Brush Beryllium in Lorain, Ohio. The Ames Project began working on a production process in December 1943, reducing beryllium fluoride in a bomb with metallic magnesium and a sulphur booster. The main difficulty with working with beryllium was its high toxicity. A closed bomb was used to minimize the possibility of producing toxic beryllium dust. The process worked, but the high temperatures and pressures created by the magnesium sulphide meant that it was potentially explosive. An alternative was then developed using beryllium fluoride in a bomb with metallic calcium and a lead chloride booster. The metal was cast in a vacuum. Research was still ongoing when the war ended.

=== Cerium ===
In mid-1944, the Ames Project was asked to produce cerium. This was being used by the laboratories at Berkeley and Los Alamos for cerium sulphide, which was used in crucibles to cast plutonium. Again, the bomb method was used, this time to reduce anhydrous cerium chloride with calcium using an iodine booster. A special "dry room" was constructed for drying out the cerium chloride using hydrogen chloride gas. The resulting metal contained calcium and magnesium impurity, so it had to be recast to remove them. The opportunity was taken to make it into 0.75-inch (1.9 cm) diameter rods 4 inches (10 cm) long, the desired shape. Because cerium is so reactive, the remelting was done in a vacuum, using a calcium oxide or magnesium oxide crucible. The first shipment of cerium metal was made in August 1944. The Ames Laboratory produced 437 pounds (198 kg) of extremely (more than 99%) pure cerium by August 1945, when production ended.

== Alloys ==
Since uranium metal had been so scarce before the war, little was known about its metallurgy, but with uranium being used in the reactors, the Manhattan Project became keenly interested in its properties. In particular, with water being used for cooling, there was speculation about alloys with high thermal conductivity and resistance to corrosion. The Ames Project produced and tested uranium carbide, which had a potential to be used as a fuel in reactors instead of metallic uranium. So too was bismuth, because of its low neutron capture cross section, so the Ames Project produced and tested uranium-bismuth alloys.

At one point a proposal was on the table to protect the uranium in a reactor from corrosion by jacketing it with copper. The Ames Project therefore studied uranium-copper alloys, which would occur where the uranium met the copper jacket. In practice, the uranium was canned in aluminum; this too was studied, as were alloys with tin, which was used to solder the cans. Tests were also carried out with alloys of uranium with beryllium, calcium, cobalt, magnesium, manganese and thorium, which were being produced or in use elsewhere in the Ames Project. Attempts were made to separate plutonium from uranium through metallurgy, exploiting plutonium's greater affinity with gold and silver, but the Manhattan Project chose to use the bismuth phosphate process, a chemical separation method, instead.

The Ames Project also studied thorium, alloying it with bismuth, carbon, chromium, iron, manganese, molybdenum, nickel, oxygen, tin, tungsten and uranium, and alloyed beryllium with bismuth, lead, thorium, uranium and zinc.

== Chemistry ==
The chemistry of uranium was the focus of multiple studies by the Ames Project. The properties of the various uranium oxides and uranium hydride were investigated. The latter of was particular interest because at one point the Los Alamos Laboratory considered using it in an atomic bomb instead of metallic uranium, but the idea was found to be inefficient, and was shelved. A process was developed to recovery depleted uranium metal from the uranium tetrafluoride left over from the electromagnetic isotope separation process and uranium hexafluoride left over from the gaseous diffusion process. This was operated as a pilot plant that produced kilogram quantities, before being turned over to the Manhattan Project's SAM Laboratories for implementation on an industrial scale at Oak Ridge.

If the chemistry and metallurgy of uranium was poorly understood, that of plutonium was practically unknown, as it had only existed in microscopic amounts. Samples began arriving from the reactors in 1943, and although the locus of the Manhattan Project's investigations into plutonium chemistry was at the Metallurgical Laboratory, the Ames Project investigated methods of separating plutonium metal from uranium and fission products.

== Post-war ==
Major General Leslie R. Groves Jr., the director of the Manhattan Project, visited Iowa State College on 12 October 1945, and presented the Army-Navy "E" Award for Excellence in Production for its part in producing uranium for the Manhattan Project. It was unprecedented for a college or university to receive this award, which was usually given to industrial organizations. The award came in the form of a banner sporting four white stars, representing two and a half years of service to the war effort. As of 2011, the award was on display at Iowa State University in Spedding Hall.

The Iowa State Board of Education created the Institute of Atomic Research (IAR) as a coordinating body for research throughout the Midwestern United States on 1 November 1945, with Spedding as its director. The Manhattan Project continued to fund the activities of the Ames Project, but with the passage of the Atomic Energy Act of 1946, responsibility passed to the newly created Atomic Energy Commission (AEC) on 1 January 1947.

On 17 May 1947, the AEC awarded the contract to run the Ames Laboratory, which now had the status of a national laboratory, to Iowa State College. The laboratory remained on the Iowa State College campus, and its faculty and graduate students made up most of the staff. Spedding remained its director until he retired in 1968. Administration was delegated to the IAR. Permanent buildings were constructed that were opened in 1948 and 1950, and subsequently named Wilhelm Hall and Spedding Hall. The Ames Laboratory retained a focus on chemistry and metallurgy, particularly of the rare-earth metals.
