= Ames National Laboratory =

United States DOE national laboratory in Ames, Iowa

- Established: 1947; 79 years ago
- Research type: Unclassified
- Budget: $60 million
- Director: Karl Mueller
- Staff: 473
- Students: 198
- Location: Ames, Iowa; 42.0305°N 93.6482°W
- Affiliations: United States Department of Energy
- Operating agency: Iowa State University
- Nobel laureates: Dan Shechtman
- Website: ameslab.gov

Ames National Laboratory, formerly Ames Laboratory, is a United States Department of Energy national laboratory located in Ames, Iowa, and affiliated with Iowa State University. It is a top-level national laboratory for research on national security, energy, and the environment. The laboratory conducts research into areas of national concern, including the synthesis and study of new materials, energy resources, high-speed computer design, and environmental cleanup and restoration. It is located on the campus of Iowa State University.

In January 2013 the Department of Energy announced the establishment of the Critical Materials Institute (CMI) at Ames Laboratory, with a mission to develop solutions to the domestic shortages of rare-earth metals and other materials critical to US energy security.

== History ==
=== 1940s ===
In 1942, Frank Spedding of Iowa State College, an expert in the chemistry of rare-earth elements, agreed to set up and direct a chemical research and development program, since called the Ames Project, to accompany the Manhattan Project's existing physics program. Its purpose was to produce high purity uranium from uranium ores. Harley Wilhelm developed new methods for both reducing and casting uranium metal, making it possible to cast large ingots of the metal and reduce production costs by as much as twenty-fold. About one-third, or around two tons, of the uranium used in the first self-sustaining nuclear reaction at the University of Chicago was provided through these procedures, now known as the Ames Process. The Ames Project produced more than two million pounds (1,000 short tons; 910,000 kg) of uranium for the Manhattan Project until industry took over the process in 1945.

The Ames Project received the Army-Navy 'E' Award for Excellence in Production on October 12, 1945, signifying two-and-a-half years of excellence in industrial production of metallic uranium as a vital war material. Iowa State University is unique among educational institutions to have received this award for outstanding service, an honor normally given to industry. Other key accomplishments related to the project included:

- Development of a process to recover uranium from scrap materials and convert it into good ingots.
- Development of an ion-exchange process to separate rare-earth elements from each other in gram quantities — something not possible with other methods.
- Development of a large-scale production process for thorium using a bomb-reduction method.

Ames Laboratory was formally established in 1947 by the United States Atomic Energy Commission as a result of the Ames Project's success.

=== 1950s ===
During the 1950s the Lab's growing reputation for its work with rare-earth metals rapidly increased its workload. As the country explored the uses of nuclear power, lab scientists studied nuclear fuels and structural materials for nuclear reactors. Processes developed at Ames Laboratory resulted in the production of the purest rare-earth metals in the world while at the same time greatly reducing their price. In most cases, Lab facilities served as models for large-scale production of rare-earth metals. Analytical chemistry efforts expanded to keep up with the need to analyze new materials.

Other key accomplishments from the 1950s included:

- Development of processes for separating hafnium, niobium, barium, strontium, caesium and rubidium.
- Discovery of a new isotope, phosphorus-33.
- Separation of high-purity rare-earth oxides in kilogram quantities.
- Development of a method of separating plutonium and fission products from spent uranium fuel.
- Production of high-purity yttrium metal in large quantities, shipping more than 18,000 pounds (8,200 kg) before industry took over the process.

=== 1960s ===
During the 1960s the Lab reached peak employment as its scientists continued exploring new materials. As part of that effort, the Lab built a 5-megawatt heavy water reactor for neutron diffraction studies and additional isotope separation research. The United States Atomic Energy Commission established the Rare-Earth Information Center at Ames Lab to provide the scientific and technical communities with information about rare-earth metals and their compounds.

Other key accomplishments from the 1960s included:

- Development of a process to produce thorium metal with a purity of 99.985 percent.
- Development of a process for producing high-purity vanadium metal for nuclear applications.
- Discovery of a new isotope, copper-69.
- Conducted the first successful operation of an isotope separator connected to a reactor in order to study short-lived radioactivity produced by fission of uranium-235.
- Growth of the first large crystal of solid helium

=== 1970s ===
During the 1970s, as the United States Atomic Energy Commission evolved into the United States Department of Energy, efforts diversified as some research programs closed and new ones opened. Federal officials consolidated reactor facilities, leading to the closure of the research reactor. Ames Laboratory responded by putting new emphasis on applied mathematics, solar power, fossil fuels and pollution control. Innovative analytical techniques were developed to provide precise information from increasingly small samples. Foremost among them was inductively coupled plasma-atomic emission spectroscopy, which could rapidly and simultaneously detect up to 40 different trace metals from a small sample.

Other key accomplishments from the 1970s included:

- Development of a highly sensitive technique for the direct analysis of mercury in air, water, fish, and soils.
- Development of a method for isolating minute amounts of organic compounds found in water.
- Development of a process for removing copper, tin, and chromium from automotive scrap, yielding reclaimed steel pure enough for direct re-use.
- Development of an image intensifier screen that significantly reduced exposure to medical X-rays.
- Development of a solar heating module that could both store and transmit solar power.

=== 1980s ===
In the 1980s research at Ames Laboratory evolved to meet local and national energy needs. Fossil energy research focused on ways to burn coal cleaner. New technologies were developed to clean up nuclear waste sites. High-performance computing research augmented the applied mathematics and solid-state physics programs. Ames Laboratory became a national leader in the fields of superconductivity and nondestructive evaluation. In addition, DOE established the Materials Preparation Center to provide public access to the development of new materials.

Other key accomplishments from the 1980s included:

- Development of a liquid-junction solar cell that was efficient, durable and non-toxic.
- Received Defense Department funding to develop nondestructive evaluation techniques for aircraft.
- Became DOE's lead laboratory for managing the environmental assessment of energy recovery processes.
- Development of a new method for alloying pure neodymium with iron, producing the feedstock for a widely used neodymium magnet.
- Assisted in development of Terfenol, which changes form in a magnetic field, making it ideal for sonar and transducer applications.

=== 1990s ===
Encouraged by the United States Department of Energy, in the 1990s Ames Laboratory continued its efforts to transfer basic research findings to industry for the development of new materials, products, and processes. The Scalable Computing Laboratory was established to find ways of making parallel computing accessible and cost-effective for the scientific community. Researchers discovered the first non-carbon example of buckyballs, a new material important in the field of microelectronics. Scientists developed a DNA sequencer that was 24 times faster than other devices, and a technique that assessed the nature of DNA damage by chemical pollutants.

Other key accomplishments of the 1990s included:

- Development of the HINT benchmarking technique that objectively compared computers of all sizes, now supported by Brigham Young University's HINT site.
- Improvement of a method of high pressure gas atomization for turning molten metal into fine-grained metal powders.
- Prediction of the geometry for a ceramic structure with a photonic band gap. These structures may improve the efficiency of lasers, sensing devices and antennas.
- Discovery of a new class of materials that could make magnetic refrigeration a viable cooling technology for the future.
- Development of a high-strength lead-free solder that is stronger, easier to use, stands up better in high-heat conditions, and is environmentally safe.
- Development of novel, platinum-modified nickel-aluminide coatings that delivered unprecedented oxidation and phase stability as bond coat layers in thermal barrier coatings, which could improve the durability of gas turbine engines, allowing them to operate at higher temperatures and extending their lifetimes.
- Discovery of intermetallic compounds that are ductile at room temperature, and which could be used to produce practical materials from coatings that are highly resistant to corrosion and strong at high temperatures to flexible superconducting wires and powerful magnets.
- Research on the photophysics of luminescent organic thin films and organic light-emitting diodes resulted in a novel integrated oxygen sensor and a new sensor company.
- Development of a biosensor technology that helps to determine an individual's risk of getting cancer from chemical pollutants.
- Development of a capillary electrophoresis unit that can analyze multiple chemical samples simultaneously. This unit has applications in the pharmaceutical, genetics, medical, and forensics fields.
- The design and demonstration of photonic band gap crystals, a geometrical arrangement of dielectric materials that allow light to pass except when the frequency falls within a forbidden range. These materials would make it easier to develop numerous practical devices, including optical lasers, optical computers, and solar cells.

=== 2000s ===
- Development of a mechanochemical process that is a solvent-free way to produce organic compounds in solid state. It is being used to study new, complex hydride materials that could provide a solution for high-capacity, safe hydrogen storage needed to make hydrogen-powered vehicles viable.
- Development of advanced electric drive motor technology through design of a high-performance permanent magnet alloy that operates with good magnetic strength at 200 degrees Celsius, or 392 degrees Fahrenheit, to help make electric drive motors more efficient and cost-effective.
- Mimicking bacteria to synthesize magnetic nano particles that could be used for drug targeting and delivery, in magnetic inks and high-density memory devices, or as magnetic seals in motors.
- Combining gasification with high-tech nanoscale porous catalysts, they hope to create ethanol from a wide range of biomass, including distiller’s grain left over from ethanol production, corn stover from the field, grass, wood pulp, animal waste, and garbage.
- Discovery of a boron-aluminum-magnesium ceramic alloy that exhibits exceptional hardness. Adding a coating of BAM to blades could reduce friction and increase wear resistance, which could have a significant effect in boosting the efficiency of pumps, which are used in all kinds of industrial and commercial applications.
- Materials produced by the Ames Laboratory's Materials Preparation Center (MPC) were launched into outer space as part of the European Space Agency's Planck Mission. The MPC-produced lanthanum-nickel-tin alloy was used in Planck's crycooler systems to cool instruments during the space mission.
- Development of osgBullet, a software package that creates 3D real-time computer simulations. The osgBullet software won a 2010 R&D 100 Award.
- Research confirming negative refraction can be observed in photonic crystals in the microwave region of the electromagnetic spectrum, which moves physicists one step closer to constructing materials that exhibit negative refraction at optical wavelengths and realizing the much-sought-after superlens.

=== 2011 and beyond ===
- Development of a new alloy that achieved a 25 percent improvement in the ability of a key material to convert heat into electrical energy, which may someday improve efficiency in automobiles, military vehicles, and large-scale power generating facilities.
- Signed a memorandum of understanding with the Korean Institute of Industrial Technology to promote international collaboration in rare-earth research.
- Dan Shechtman, an Associate of Ames National Laboratory, was awarded the 2011 Nobel Prize in Chemistry for the discovery of quasicrystals at Johns Hopkins University.
- Gas atomization technology was used to make titanium powder with processes that are ten times more efficient than traditional powder-making methods, which significantly lowers the cost of titanium powder to manufacturers. The technology led to the formation of a company that won the Obama Administration's America's Next Top Energy Innovators Challenge. The company based on the technology, Iowa Powder Atomization Technology, also won the 2012 John Pappajohn Iowa Business Plan competition.
- Pioneering mass spectrometry methods developed at the Ames Laboratory are helping plant biologists get their first glimpses of never-before-seen plant tissue structures, an advancement that opens new realms of study that may have long-ranging implications for biofuels research and crops genetics.
- Scientists are unraveling the mysteries of exotic superconductors, materials that when cooled have zero electric resistance, which may someday help increase the efficiency of power distribution.
- Discovery of the underlying order in metallic glasses, which may hold the key to the ability to create new high-tech alloys with specific properties.
- Discovery of new ways of using a well-known polymer in organic light emitting diodes (OLEDs), which could eliminate the need for an increasingly problematic and breakable metal-oxide used in screen displays in computers, televisions, and cell phones.
- Researching ways to perfect a next-generation power cable made of an aluminum and calcium composite. Cables of this composite would be lighter and stronger, and its conductivity at least 10 percent better than existing materials for DC power, a growing segment of global power transmission.
- DOE awarded $120 million to the Ames Laboratory in 2013 to start a new Energy Innovation Hub, the Critical Materials Institute, which will focus on finding and commercializing ways to reduce reliance on the critical materials essential for American competitiveness in the clean energy technologies.
- Broke ground in 2014 on a new state-of-the-art Sensitive Instrument Facility (SIF). The SIF will be the new home of the Laboratory's existing scanning transmission electron microscope and some new highly sensitive equipment, providing an environment isolated from vibration, electro-magnetic and other types of interference that can obscure atomic scale details from clear view. The SIF was scheduled to be completed in 2015.
- Revealing the mysteries of new materials using ultra-fast laser spectroscopy, similar to high-speed photography where many quick images reveal subtle movements and changes inside the materials. Seeing these dynamics is one emerging strategy to better understanding how new materials work so they can be used to enable new energy technologies.
- Creation of a faster, cleaner biofuel refining technology that not only combines processes but uses widely available materials to reduce costs.
- Home to a dynamic nuclear polarization (DNP) solid-state nuclear magnetic resonance (NMR) spectrometer that helps scientists understand how individual atoms are arranged in materials. Ames Laboratory's DNP-NMR is the first to be used for materials science and chemistry in the United States.
- In celebration of the 75th anniversary of its establishment as a DOE national laboratory, Ames Laboratory is renamed to Ames National Laboratory on July 14, 2022.

== Ames Laboratory directors ==
No.	Image	Director	Term start	Term end	Refs.
1		Frank Spedding	1947	1968	
2		Robert Hansen	1968	1988	
3		Thomas Barton	1988	February 28, 2007	
acting		Alan Goldman	March 1, 2007	December 31, 2007	
4		Alexander King	January 1, 2008	May 2, 2013	
acting		Tom Lograsso	May 2, 2013	June 1, 2014	
5		Adam Schwartz	June 2, 2014	May 31, 2024	
6		Karl Mueller	June 1, 2025	present	

== Notable alumni and faculty ==
Frank Spedding (B.S. 1925, M.S. 1926) (deceased 1984), directed the chemistry phase of the Manhattan Project in World War II, which led to the world's first controlled nuclear reaction. He was Iowa State's second member of the National Academy of Sciences and the first director of the Ames Laboratory. Dr. Spedding won the Langmuir Award in 1933, Only Oscar K. Rice and Linus Pauling preceded him in this achievement. The award is now called the Award in Pure Chemistry of the American Chemical Society. He was the first Distinguished Professor of Sciences and Humanities at Iowa State (1957). Further awards included: William H. Nichols Award of the New York section of the American Chemical Society (1952); the James Douglas Gold Medal from the American Institute of Mining, Metallurgical, and Petroleum Engineers (1961) for achievements in nonferrous metallurgy; and the Francis J. Clamer Award from the Franklin Institute (1969) for achievements in metallurgy.

Harley Wilhelm (Ph.D. 1931) (deceased 1995), developed the most efficient process to produce uranium metal for the Manhattan Project, the Ames Process, a process still in use.

Velmer A. Fassel (Ph.D. 1947) (deceased 1998), developed the inductively coupled plasma atomic emission spectroscopy (ICP-AES) analytical process, used for chemical analysis worldwide; former deputy director of the Ames Laboratory.

Karl A. Gschneidner, Jr. (B.S. 1952, Ph.D 1957) (deceased) elected Fellow of the National Academy of Engineering in 2007, Gschneidner was a world authority in the physical metallurgy, and thermal and electrical behavior of rare-earth materials. Gschneidner was a Fellow of the Minerals, Metals, and Materials Society, Fellow of the American Society for Materials International, and Fellow of the American Physical Society.

James J. Renier (Ph.D. 1955) (deceased 2019), chairman and chief executive officer of Honeywell Inc. (1988–93).

Darleane C. Hoffman (Ph.D. 1951), a 1997 recipient of the National Medal of Science, helped confirm the existence of element 106, seaborgium.

John H. Weaver (Ph.D. 1973), named Scientist of the Year for 1997 by R&D Magazine. Weaver heads the Department of Materials Science and Engineering at the University of Illinois, Urbana-Champaign.

James Halligan (B.S. 1962, M.S. 1965, Ph.D. 1967), president of Oklahoma State University (1994–2002).

Allan Mackintosh (deceased 1995), expert on rare-earth metals and President of the European Physical Society.

James W. Mitchell (Ph.D. 1970), named Iowa State University's first George Washington Carver Professor in 1994. He won two R&D 100 Awards and the prestigious Percy L. Julian Research Award given by the National Organization for the Professional Advancement of Black Chemists and Chemical Engineers for innovative industrial research. Mitchell was vice president of the Materials Research Laboratory at Bell Laboratories, Lucent Technologies.

John Corbett (deceased 2013), chemistry and Ames Laboratory, member of the National Academy of Sciences, created the first non-carbon example of buckyballs; discovered more than 1,000 new materials.

Kai-Ming Ho, Che-Ting Chan, and Costas Soukoulis, physics and Ames Laboratory, were the first to design and demonstrate the existence of photonic band gap crystals, a discovery that led to the development of the rapidly expanding field of photonic crystals. Photonic crystals are expected to have revolutionary applications in optical communication and other areas of light technology. Soukoulis is a recipient of the Descartes Prize for Excellence in Scientific Collaborative Research, the European Union’s highest honor in the field of science.

Dan Shechtman, materials science and engineering and Associate of Ames National Laboratory, awarded the 2011 Nobel Prize in Chemistry for the discovery of quasicrystals at Johns Hopkins University.

Patricia Thiel (deceased 2020), chemistry and Ames Laboratory, received one of the first 100 National Science Foundation Women in Science and Engineering Awards (presented in 1991). Also received the AVS Medard W. Welch Award, which recognizes outstanding research in the fields of materials, interfaces, and processing (presented in 2014).

Edward Yeung, chemistry and Ames Lab, first person to quantitatively analyze the chemical contents of a single human red blood cell, using a device that he designed and built; the development could lead to improved detection of AIDS, cancer and genetic diseases such as Alzheimer's, muscular dystrophy and Down syndrome. Yeung has won four R&D 100 Awards and an Editor's Choice award from R&D Magazine for this pioneering work. He was the 2002 recipient of the American Chemical Society Award in Chromatography for his research in chemical separations.

Klaus Ruedenberg, physics and Ames Laboratory, 2001 recipient of the American Chemical Society Award in Theoretical Chemistry for his innovative research in the field of theoretical chemistry.

Paul C. Canfield, Sergey Bud'ko, Costas Soukoulis, physics and Ames Laboratory, named to Thomas Reuters' World's Most Influential Scientific Minds 2014. The award recognizes the greatest number of highly cited papers (among the top 1 percent for their subject field and year of publication between 2002 and 2012).

Costas Soukoulis, physics and Ames Laboratory, received the Max Born Award from the Optical Society of America in 2014. The award honors a scientist who has made outstanding contributions to the scientific field of physical optics.
