= Budko =

Budko is a surname. Notable people with the surname include:

- Bogdan Budko (born 2006), Ukrainian footballer
- Sergey Budko, physicist
- Walt Budko (1925–2013), American basketball player
