= Cai-Zhuang Wang =

Cai-Zhuang Wang is a Chinese physicist.

Wang earned a bachelor's degree in physics from the University of Science and Technology of China in 1982 and completed a PhD in the subject at the International School for Advanced Studies in 1986. He then joined the Ames Laboratory the following year as a postdoctoral fellow. Wang became an associate physicist in 1992, and eventually advanced to senior scientist within Ames Laboratory. He is an adjunct professor of Iowa State University's Department of Physics and Astronomy.

In 2014, Wang was elected a fellow of the American Physical Society, "[f]or significant advances in developing computational methods including tight-binding molecular dynamics for atomistic simulations, genetic algorithm for crystal and interface structure prediction, and Gutzwiller density functional theory for strongly correlated electron systems."
