= Che-Ting Chan =

Hong Kong physicist

Che-Ting Chan (Chinese: 陳子亭) is a physicist from Hong Kong.

Chan graduated from the University of Hong Kong in 1980 and earned a PhD at the University of California, Berkeley in 1985. After working at Ames Laboratory, he returned to Hong Kong in 1995 to teach at Hong Kong University of Science and Technology. At HKUST, Chan holds the Daniel C K Yu Professorship of Science and chairs the Department of Physics.

Chan was elected a fellow of the American Physical Society in 1996, and a member of the Hong Kong Academy of Sciences in 2021.
