= Spectrochemistry =

Spectrochemistry is the application of spectroscopy in any of several fields of chemistry.

It includes the analysis of spectra in chemical terms, and the use of spectra to derive the structure of chemical compounds, and to qualitatively and quantitatively analyze their presence in samples.
