= Army-Navy "E" Award =

Honor presented to companies during World War II

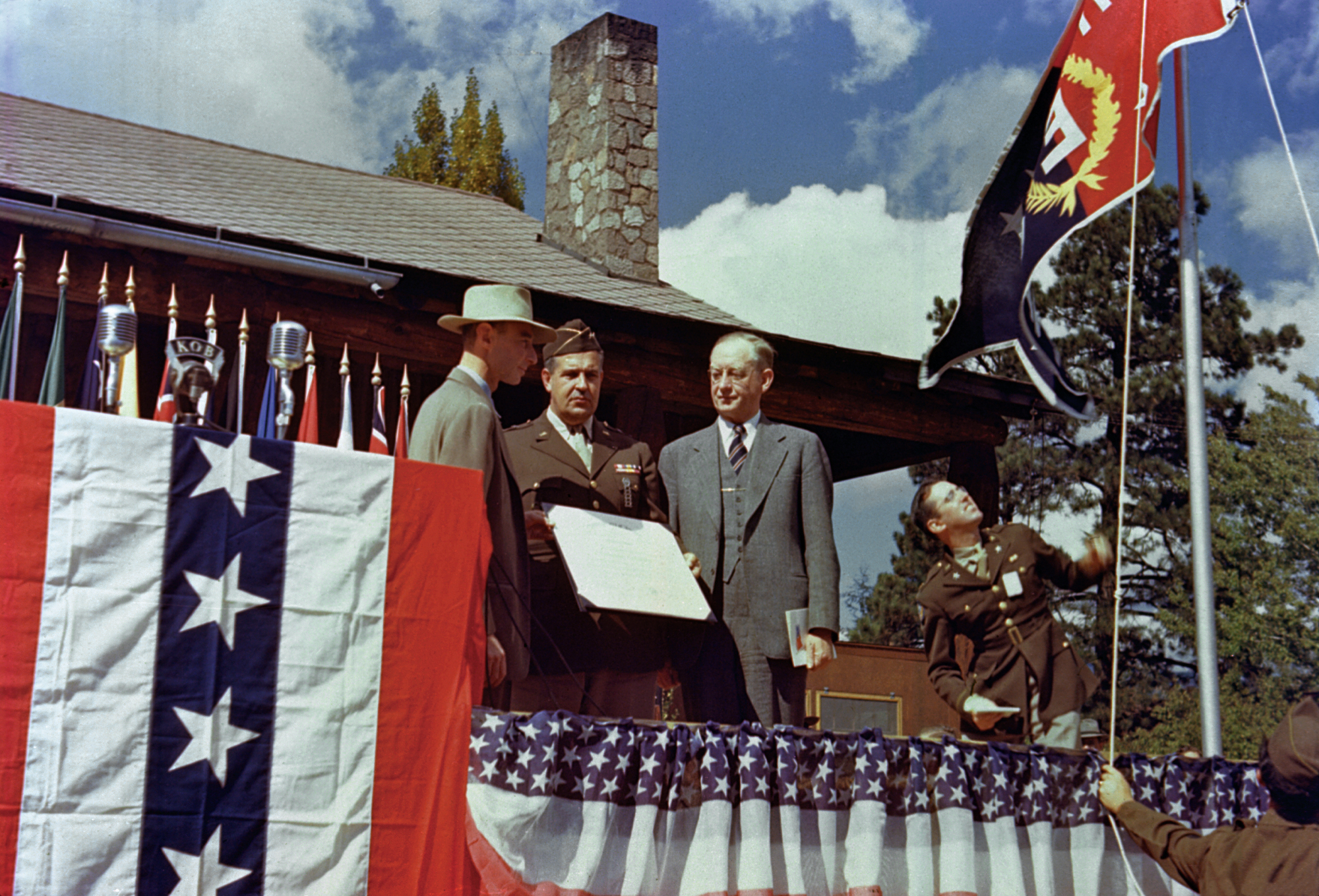
Los Alamos Laboratory director J. Robert Oppenheimer (left), Manhattan Project director Major General Leslie Groves (center) and University of California president Robert Gordon Sproul (right) at the ceremony to present the laboratory with the Army-Navy "E" Award in October 1945. An army officer hoists the red and blue E Award pennant up the flagpole.

The Army-Navy "E" Award was an honor presented to companies and organizations during World War II whose production facilities achieved "Excellence in Production" ("E") of war equipment. The award was also known as the Army-Navy Production Award. The award was created to encourage industrial mobilization and production of war time materials. By war's end, the award had been earned by only 5% of the more than 85,000 companies involved in producing materials for the U.S. military's war effort.

== History ==
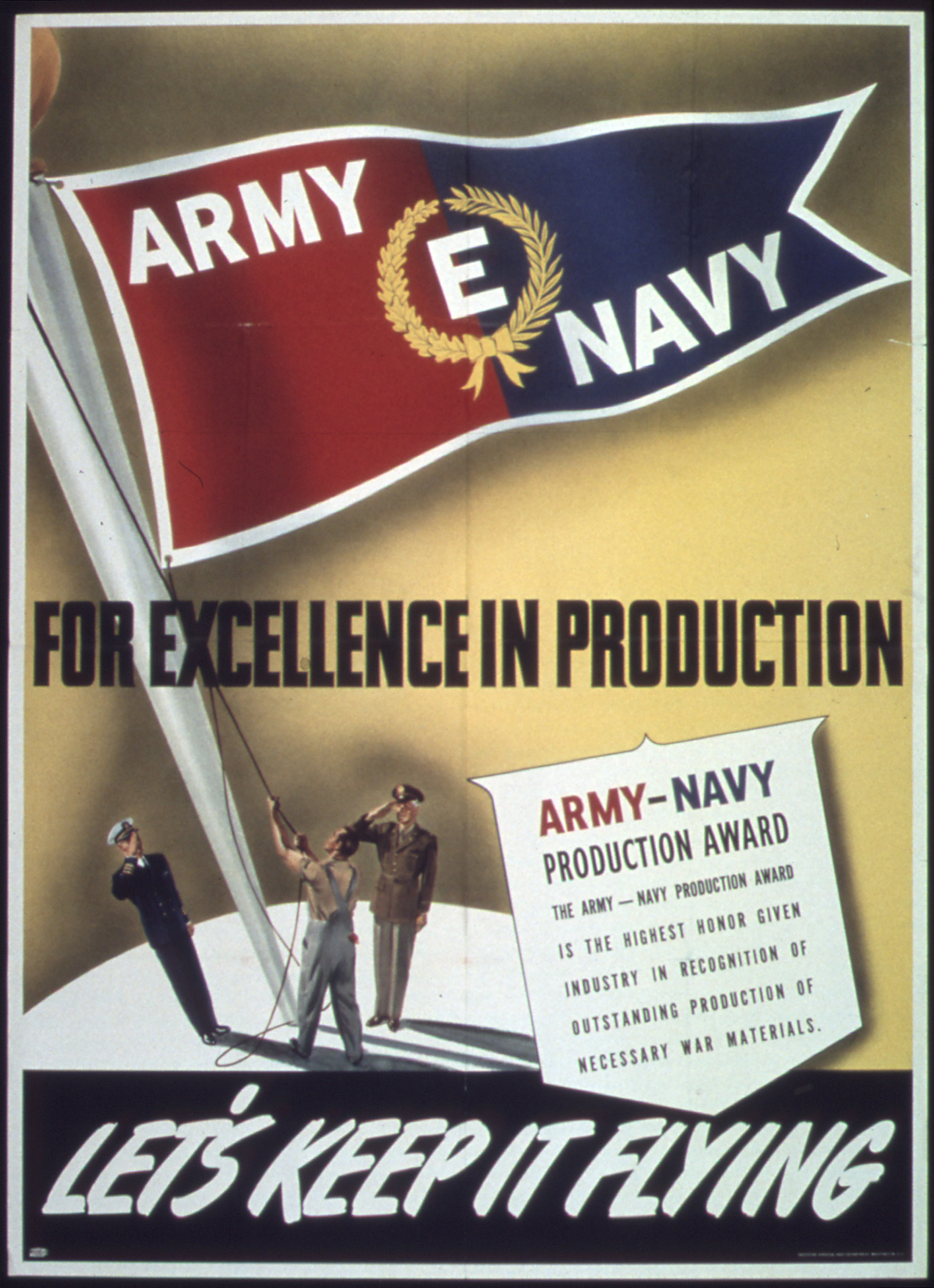
For Excellence in production, Army Navy "E", Let's Keep It Flying!

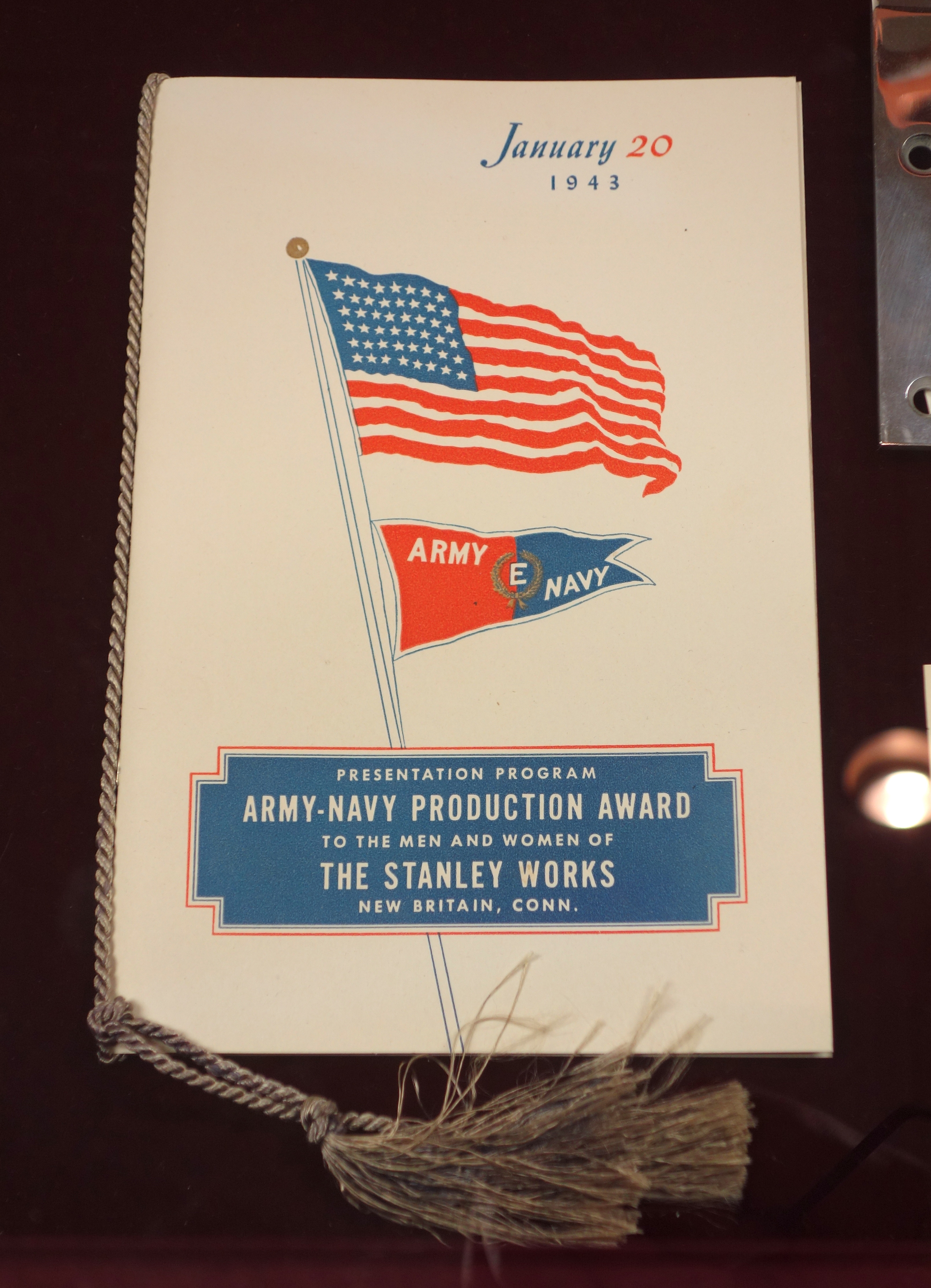
Army-Navy Production Award to Stanley Works, presentation program, January 20, 1943

An earlier award, the Navy "E" Award, had been created in 1906 during Theodore Roosevelt's administration. By the end of World War I, the Navy "E" Award had been joined by the Army "A" Award and the Army-Navy Munitions Board "Star".

These three separate awards continued until seven months after the attack on Pearl Harbor had pulled the United States into World War II. In July 1942, the War Department proclaimed that the new Army-Navy "E" Award would merge the Navy "E", Army "A" and Army-Navy Munitions Board "Star" into a single, service-wide award.

== Criteria ==
All factories engaged in war production were eligible to receive the award. Government as well as privately owned plants were eligible, as were contractors.

Although the award was granted to industry, one academic institution and one individual received it. Iowa State College (now Iowa State University) received the award for its contribution to the production of uranium for the Manhattan Project. Harley A. Wilhelm received the award for inventing the Ames process for the extraction, purification and mass production of uranium for the Manhattan Project, which occurred at Iowa State College.

Some factors which were considered in selecting recipients were:

- Quality and quantity of production
- Overcoming of production obstacles
- Avoidance of work stoppages
- Maintaining of fair labor standards
- Training of additional labor forces
- Good record keeping in relation to health and safety

District procurement officers, chiefs of the supply services, agencies concerned with production and the Commanding Officers for the Matériel Commands would recommend plants, complete with the reasons for such recommendations. An Award Board would review the recommended plants and decide on granting of the awards.

== Design ==
The award consisted of a pennant for the production plant and emblems for all employees in the plant at the time the award was made. The pennant was a triangular swallowtail with a white border, with a capital E within a yellow wreath of oak and laurel leaves on a vertical divided blue and red background. ARMY is on the red background and NAVY on the blue background.

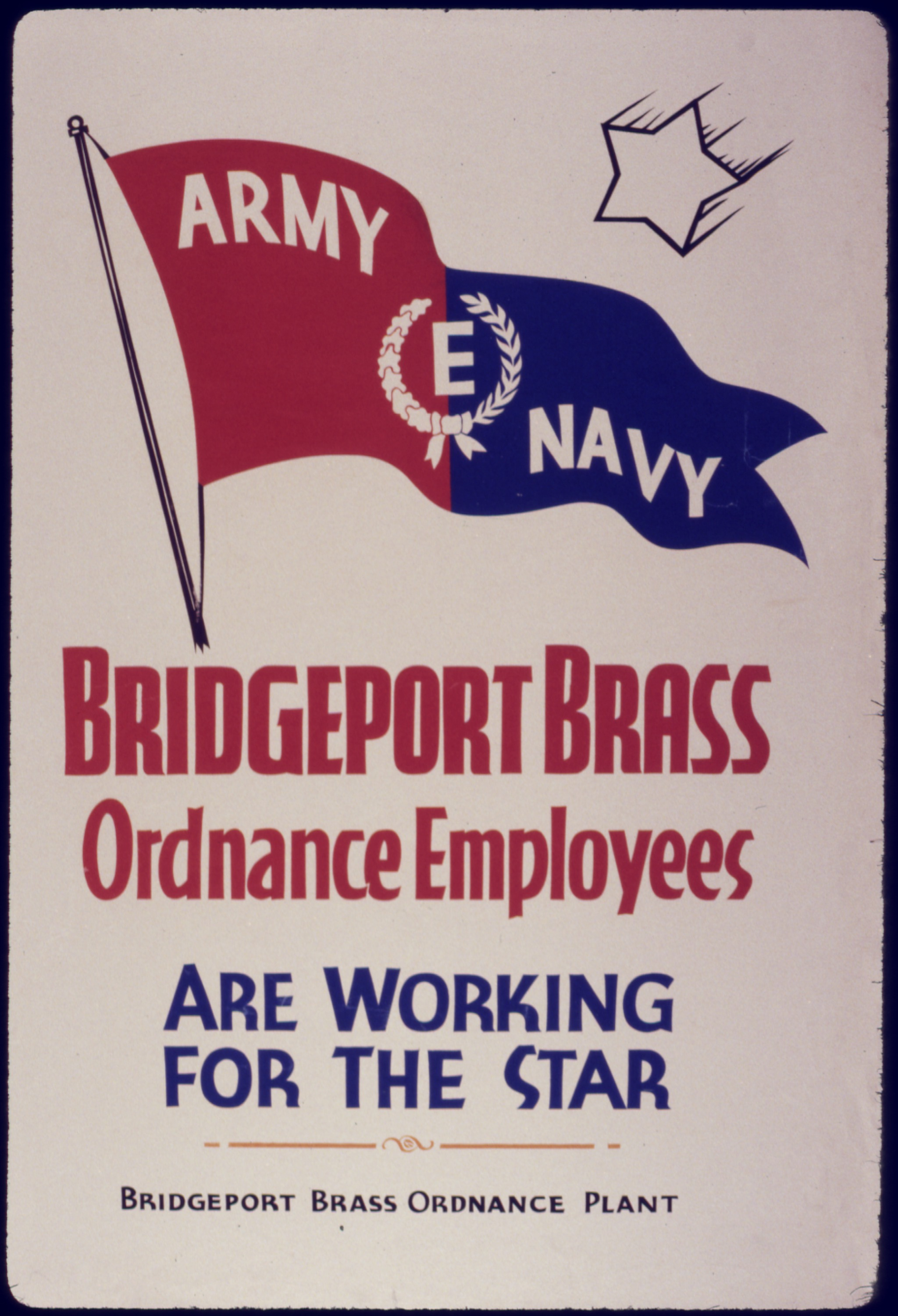
Army & Navy. Bridgeport Brass Ordnance Employees Are Working For the Star

Plants that maintained an outstanding record of performance for six months after receiving their original Army-Navy E-Award were granted a star award, with a white star added to their pennant. As with only a small percentage of all war production companies earning an Army-Navy "E" Award, only a small number of these earned stars, with a very small number of plants earning six stars by the end of the war.

== Ceremony ==
Usually an Army officer and a Navy officer would be present at a ceremony, where the company would assemble all the employees involved in production. After the award of the pennant to the plant (to be flown), the employees present would receive individual pins.

A total of 4,283 companies received the award in the course of the war. This amounted to about five percent of the companies engaged in war work.

== Program end ==
The Army-Navy "E" Award was terminated three months after the end of World War II, on December 5, 1945.
