= James J. Renier =

American business executive who was president of Honeywell

- Born: 1930; Duluth, Minnesota, United States
- Died: 2019 (aged 88–89)
- Education: Iowa State University
- Occupation: Business executive
- Known for: chair and president of Honeywell

James J. Renier (1930 – 2019) was an American business executive who served as a chair and president of Honeywell.

== Early life and education ==
Renier was born in Duluth, Minnesota, in 1930. He graduated from the College of St. Thomas and later earned a doctorate in physical chemistry titled "Iodato-silver complexing equilibria" from Iowa State University.

== Career ==
Renier began his career at Honeywell in 1956 as a senior research scientist. He held leadership positions in the company's aerospace, defense, control, and information systems divisions before being appointed CEO in 1987.

During his tenure, Honeywell underwent internal restructuring as an alternative to hostile takeovers or moving manufacturing operations abroad. The measures included cost-cutting, selling partially owned ventures, and spinning off some defense businesses.

== Philanthropy ==
Renier established New Vistas, a public school for teenage mothers and a preschool for their children located at Honeywell's corporate headquarters. The program provided transportation and modified school hours.

Renier was involved with the United Way, leading a corporate fundraising campaign in 1991 that raised $47 million. After his retirement in 1993, he founded the Success by 6 early childhood education program, which the United Way later launched nationwide. He received the organization's Distinguished Service Award in 1997.
