= Ames process =

Process by which pure uranium metal is obtained

The Ames process is a process by which pure uranium metal is obtained. It can be achieved by mixing any of the uranium halides (commonly uranium tetrafluoride) with magnesium metal powder or aluminium metal powder.

== History ==
The Ames process was used on August 3, 1942, by a group of chemists led by Frank Spedding and Harley Wilhelm at the Ames Laboratory as part of the Manhattan Project. It is a type of thermite-based purification, which was patented in 1895 by German chemist Hans Goldschmidt. Development of the Ames process came at a time of increased research into mass uranium-metal production. The desire for increased production was motivated by a fear of Nazi Germany's developing nuclear weapons before the Allies. The process originally involved mixing powdered uranium tetrafluoride and powdered magnesium together. This mixture was placed inside an iron pipe that was welded shut on one side and capped shut on another side. This container, called a "bomb" by Spedding, was placed into a furnace. (Note: In laboratory jargon, pressure vessels, such as steel autoclaves and gas cylinders, are commonly called "bombs".) When heated to a temperature of 1,500 °C (2,730 °F), the contents of the container reacted violently, leaving a 35-gram ingot of pure uranium metal. The process was quickly scaled up; by October 1942 the "Ames Project" was producing metal at a rate of 100 pounds (45 kg) per week. The uranium tetrafluoride and magnesium were sealed in a refractory-lined reactor vessel, still referred to as a "bomb". The thermite reaction was initiated by furnace heating the assembly to 600 °C (1,112 °F); the large difference in density between slag and metal allowed complete separation in the liquid state, yielding slag-free metal. By July 1943, the production rate exceeded 130,000 pounds (59,000 kg) of uranium metal per month. Approximately 1000 tons of uranium ingots were produced at Ames before the process was transferred to industry.

The Ames project received the Army-Navy "E" Award for Excellence in Production on October 12, 1945, signifying 2.5 years of excellence in industrial production of metallic uranium as a vital war material. Iowa State University is unique among educational institutions to have received this award for outstanding service, an honor normally given to industry.

Uranium refining at Ames
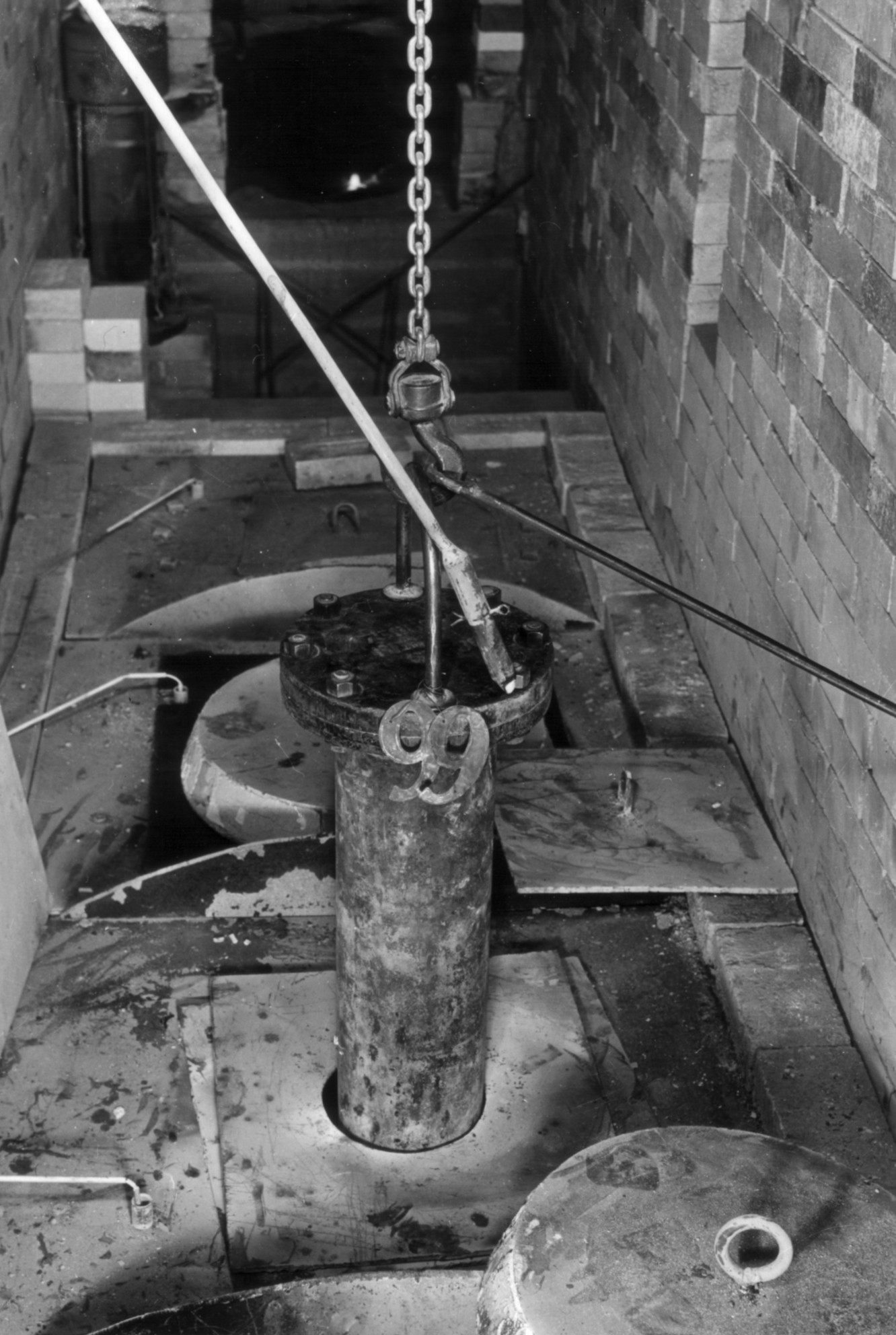
A "bomb" (pressure vessel) containing uranium halide and sacrificial metal, probably magnesium, being lowered into a furnace

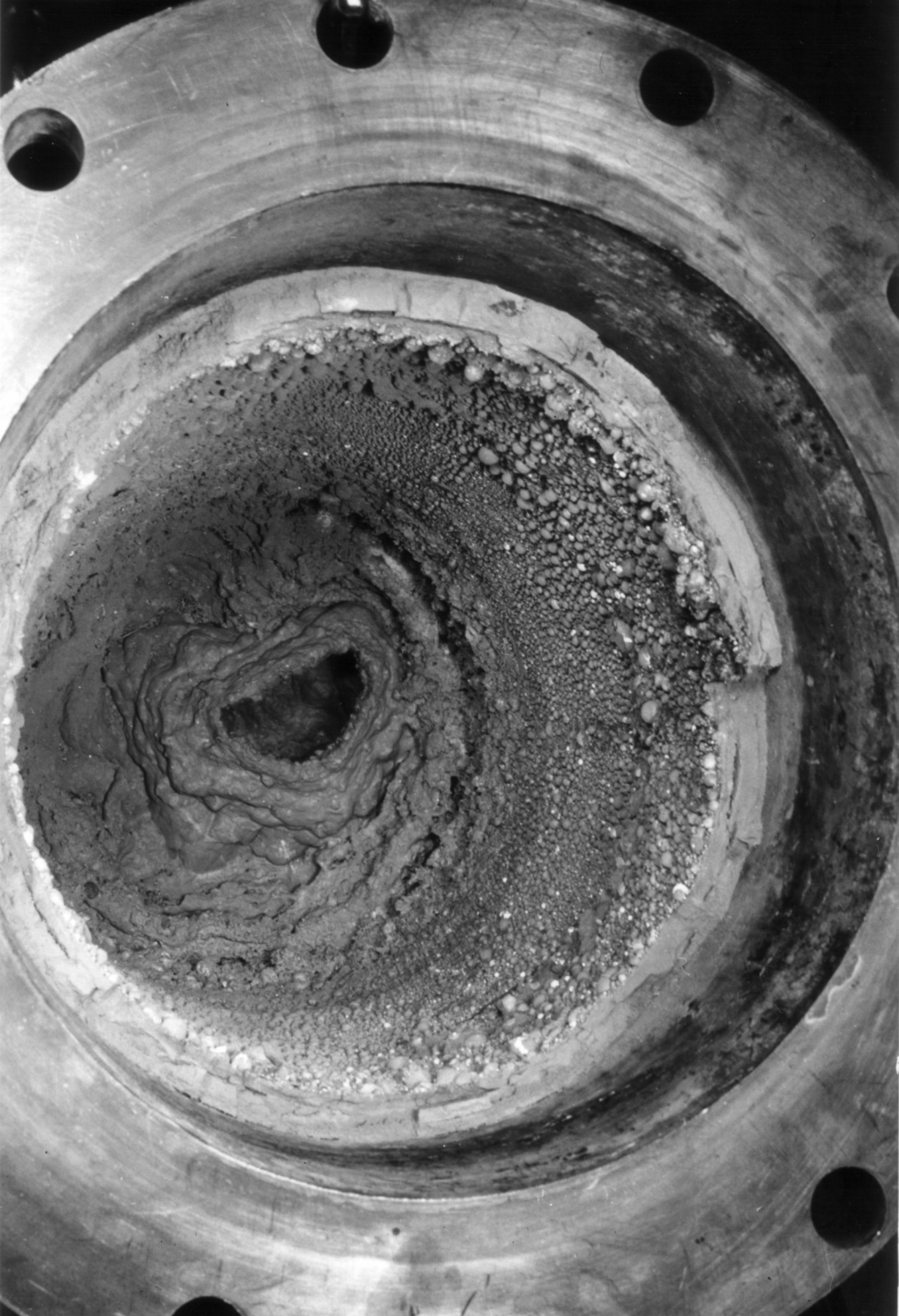
After the reaction, remnant slag coats the interior of a bomb.

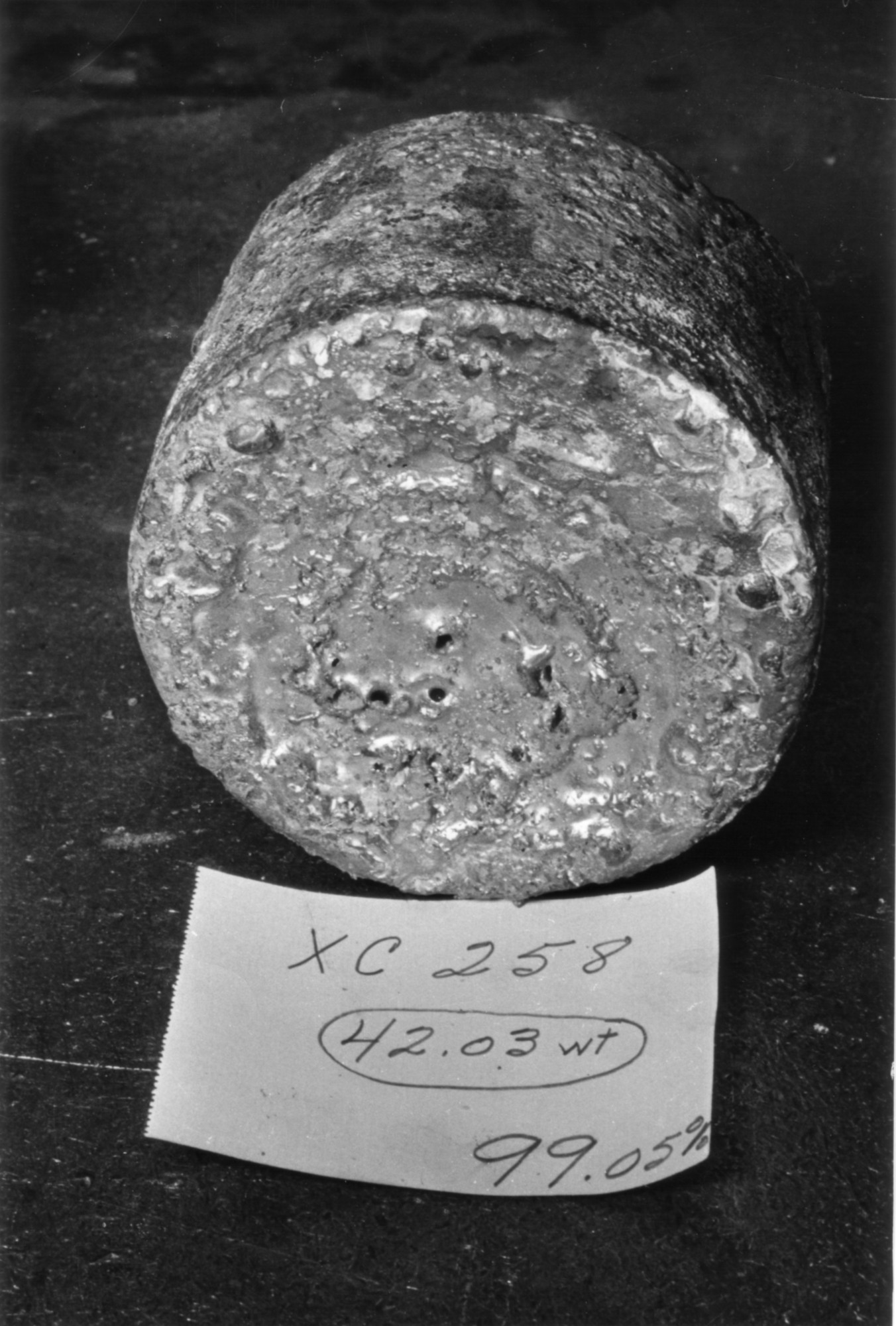
A uranium metal "biscuit" from the reduction reaction

== Ames process for rare-earth metals ==
The metallothermic reduction of anhydrous rare-earth fluorides to rare-earth metals is also referred to as the Ames process.

The study of rare earths was also advanced during World War II: synthetic plutonium was believed to be rare-earth-like, and it was assumed that knowledge of rare earths would assist in planning for and the study of transuranic elements; ion-exchange methods developed for actinide processing were forerunners to processing methods for rare-earth oxides; methods used for uranium were modified for plutonium, which were subsequently the basis for rare-earth metal preparation.
