= Lead chloride =

Lead chloride may refer to:

- Lead(II) chloride (plumbous chloride), mineral name: cotunnite.
- Lead(IV) chloride (plumbic chloride)
- Hexachloroplumbate(IV) (dianion)
