= Sergey Budko =

Sergey Budko is a physicist.

He was educated at Moscow Institute of Physics and Technology, is a scientist at Ames Laboratory, and an adjunct professor at Iowa State University. Budko was elected a fellow of the American Physical Society in 2009, “[f]or significant contributions to the study of superconducting, magnetic transport properties of metals, such as field-induced quantum criticality in heavy fermions and superconductivity in layered cuprate, rare earth nickel borocarbide, magnesium diboride, and iron arsenide-based compounds.“
