= Thomas J. Barton =

American chemist

- Education: Lamar University

Thomas J. Barton is an American chemist who served as the president of the American Chemical Society in 2014.

== Biography ==
He graduated from Lamar University, and from University of Florida in 1967. He was a post-doctoral fellow with National Institutes of Health at the Ohio State University.

He is a professor at Iowa State University.
