= Frank Spedding =

Canadian American chemist (1902–1984)

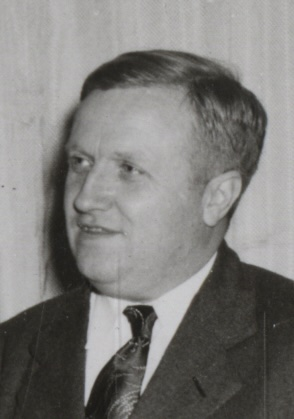
- Spedding in 1946
- Born: 22 October 1902; Hamilton, Ontario
- Died: 15 December 1984 (aged 82); Ames, Iowa
- Education: University of Michigan (BS, MS); University of California, Berkeley (PhD)
- Known for: Ames process
- Awards: ACS Award in Pure Chemistry (1933); Irving Langmuir Award (1933); William H. Nichols Award (1952); James Douglas Gold Medal (1961); Francis J. Clamer Medal (1969)
- Scientific career
- Workplaces: Cornell University; Cavendish Laboratory; Iowa State University; Metallurgical Laboratory; Ames Laboratory
- Thesis: Line absorption spectra in solids at low temperatures in the visible and ultraviolet regions of the spectrum (1929)
- Doctoral advisor: Gilbert N. Lewis

Frank Harold Spedding (22 October 1902 – 15 December 1984) was a Canadian-American chemist. He was a renowned expert on rare earth elements, and on extraction of metals from minerals. The uranium extraction process helped make it possible for the Manhattan Project to build the first atomic bombs.

A graduate of the University of Michigan and University of California, Berkeley, Spedding became an assistant professor and head of the department of physical chemistry at Iowa State College in 1937. His efforts at building up the school were so successful that he would spend the rest of his career there, becoming a professor of chemistry in 1941, a professor of physics in 1950, a professor of metallurgy in 1962, and ultimately professor emeritus in 1973. He co-founded, along with Dr. Harley Wilhelm, the Institute for Atomic Research and the Ames Laboratory of the Atomic Energy Commission, and directed the Ames Laboratory from its founding in 1947 until 1968.

Spedding developed an ion-exchange method of separating and purifying rare earth elements using ion-exchange resins, and later used ion exchange to separate isotopes of individual elements, including hundreds of grams of almost pure nitrogen-15. He published over 250 peer-reviewed papers, and held 22 patents in his own name and jointly with others. Some 88 students received their Ph.D. degree under his supervision.

== Early life and education ==
Spedding was born on 22 October 1902, in Hamilton, Ontario, Canada, the son of Howard Leslie Spedding and Mary Ann Elizabeth (Marshall) Spedding. Soon after he was born, the family moved to Michigan, and then Chicago. He became a naturalized U.S. citizen through his father. The family moved to Ann Arbor, Michigan, where his father worked as a photographer, in 1918. He entered the University of Michigan in 1920, receiving a Bachelor of Science (B.S.) degree in chemical engineering in 1925 and a Master of Science (M.S.) in analytical chemistry the following year.

As an undergraduate, Spedding took issue with the prevailing explanation by Friedrich August Kekulé of how the six carbon atoms in benzene hold together and proposed an alternate explanation. His professor, Moses Gomberg, recognised this as being the same as the (incorrect) model advanced by Albert Ladenburg in 1869. At Gomberg's suggestion, Spedding applied to the University of California, Berkeley, to study for his doctorate under Gilbert N. Lewis. Gomberg wrote a recommendation so that Spedding was not only accepted, but given a teaching fellowship as well. Under Lewis's supervision, Spedding earned his Doctor of Philosophy (Ph.D.) in 1929, writing his thesis on "Line absorption spectra in solids at low temperatures in the visible and ultraviolet regions of the spectrum". It was published that year in the Physical Review.

== Early career ==
Spedding's graduation coincided with the onset of the Great Depression, and jobs became hard to find. Spedding received a National Research Fellowship from 1930 to 1932, enabling him to stay at Berkeley and continue his research into the spectra of solids. While hiking in northern California, he met Ethel Annie MacFarlane, who shared his passion for camping, hiking and mountain climbing. Born in Winnipeg, Manitoba, she was a graduate of the University of Saskatchewan and the University of Toronto, where she had earned a master's degree in history. When they met, she was teaching at Victoria High School in Victoria, British Columbia. They were married on 21 June 1931. They had a daughter, Elizabeth, who was born in 1939.

From 1932 to 1934, Spedding worked for Lewis as a chemistry instructor. Around this time, he became interested in the chemistry of the rare earths. These were expensive and hard to find, and generally available only in minute amounts. In 1933 he won the Irving Langmuir Award for most outstanding young chemist. The award came with a cash prize of $1,000. He borrowed money to travel to Chicago to collect it. While he was there, he was approached by a man offering several pounds of europium and samarium. His benefactor was Herbert Newby McCoy, a retired chemistry professor from the University of Chicago, who had obtained a supply of these elements from the Lindsay Light and Chemical Company, where they were a byproduct of thorium production. A few weeks later, Spedding received a package in the mail containing jars of the metals.

In 1934, Spedding was awarded a Guggenheim Fellowship, allowing him to study in Europe. To save money, Spedding and his wife travelled to Europe by heading westward across the Pacific. His intention was to study in Germany under James Franck and Francis Simon, but they fled Germany after Adolf Hitler came to power in March 1933. Instead he went to the Cavendish Laboratory at the University of Cambridge in England, where he was welcomed by Ralph H. Fowler. Spedding worked with John Lennard-Jones, and attended lectures given by Max Born. He paid a visit to Niels Bohr in Copenhagen, and gave a lecture in Leningrad.

When Spedding returned to the United States in 1935, the country was still in the grip of the Great Depression, and the job market had not improved. He was George Fisher Baker assistant professor at Cornell University from 1935 to 1937. It was another temporary position, but it did allow him to work with Hans Bethe. At one point he drove out to Ohio State University hoping to find a tenure track position. The position had already been filled, but the professor of chemistry there, W. L. Evans, knew that Winfred F. (Buck) Coover at Iowa State College in Ames, Iowa, had a position. "I wouldn't normally have chosen the place," Spedding later recalled, "but I was desperate. I thought: I can go there and build up physical chemistry and when jobs really open up I can go to another school."

Spedding took up the position as assistant professor and head of the department of physical chemistry at Iowa State College in 1937. His efforts at building up the school were so successful that he would spend the rest of his career there, becoming a professor of chemistry in 1941, a professor of physics in 1950, a professor of metallurgy in 1962, and ultimately professor emeritus in 1973.

== Manhattan Project ==
By February 1942, the United States had entered World War II, and the Manhattan Project was building up. At the University of Chicago, Arthur H. Compton established its Metallurgical Laboratory. Its mission was to build nuclear reactors to create plutonium that would be used in atomic bombs. For advice on assembling the laboratory's Chemistry Division, Compton, a physicist, turned to Herbert McCoy, who had considerable experience with isotopes and radioactive elements. McCoy recommended Spedding as an expert on the rare earth elements, which were chemically similar to the actinide series that included uranium and plutonium. Compton asked Spedding to become the head of the Metallurgical Laboratory's Chemistry Division.

Due to lack of space at the University of Chicago, Spedding proposed to organise part of the Chemistry Division at Iowa State College in Ames, where he had colleagues who were willing to help. It was agreed that Spedding would spend half of each week in Ames, and half in Chicago. The first problem on the agenda was to find uranium for the nuclear reactor that Enrico Fermi was proposing to build. The only uranium metal available commercially was produced by the Westinghouse Electric and Manufacturing Company, using a photochemical process that produced ingots the size of a quarter that were sold for around $20 per gram. Edward Creutz, the head of the group responsible for fabricating the uranium, wanted a metal sphere the size of an orange for his experiments. With Westinghouse's process, it would have cost $200,000 and taken a year to produce.

The other major problem was the purity of the uranium. Impurities could act as neutron poisons and prevent a nuclear reactor from working, but the uranium oxide that Fermi wanted for his experimental reactor contained unacceptably large amounts of impurities. As a result, references published before 1942 typically listed its melting point at around 1,800 °C (3,270 °F) when pure uranium metal actually melts at 1,132 °C (2,070 °F). The most effective way to purify uranium oxide in the laboratory was to take advantage of the fact that uranium nitrate is soluble in ether. Scaling this process up for industrial production was a dangerous proposition; ether was explosive, and a factory using large quantities was likely to blow up or burn down. Compton and Spedding turned to Mallinckrodt in Saint Louis, Missouri, which had experience with ether. Spedding went over the details with Mallinckrodt's chemical engineers, Henry V. Farr and John R. Ruhoff, on 17 April 1942. Within a few months, sixty tons of highly pure uranium oxide was produced.

Spedding recruited two chemistry professors at Ames for his group there, Harley Wilhelm and I. B. Johns. Spedding and Wilhelm began looking for ways to create the uranium metal. At the time, it was produced in the form of a powder, and was highly pyrophoric. It could be pressed and sintered and stored in cans, but to be useful, it needed to be melted and cast. The Ames team found that molten uranium could be cast in a graphite container. Although graphite was known to react with uranium, this could be managed because the carbide formed only where the two touched.

To produce uranium metal, they tried reducing uranium oxide with hydrogen, but this did not work. They then investigated a process (now known as the Ames process) originally developed by J. C. Goggins and others at the University of New Hampshire in 1926. This involved mixing uranium tetrachloride and calcium metal in a calcium oxide-lined steel pressure vessel (known as a "bomb") and heating it. They were able to reproduce Goggin's results in August 1942, and by September, the Ames Project had produced a 4.980-kilogram (10.98 lb) ingot. Starting in July 1943, Mallinckrodt, Union Carbide, and DuPont began producing uranium by the Ames process, and Ames phased out its own production by early 1945. As a result, the Ames Laboratory never moved to Chicago, but Spedding was present at the University of Chicago on 2 December 1942, to witness the first controlled nuclear chain reaction in Fermi's Chicago Pile-1.

Throughout the war, the laboratory held regular information sessions known as "Speddinars". In addition to its work with uranium, the Ames Laboratory produced 437 pounds (198 kg) of extremely pure cerium for the cerium sulphide crucibles used by the plutonium metallurgists. Fears that world supplies of uranium were limited led to experiments with thorium, which could be irradiated to produce fissile uranium-233. A calcium reduction process was developed for thorium, and some 4,500 pounds (2,000 kg) was produced.

== Later life ==
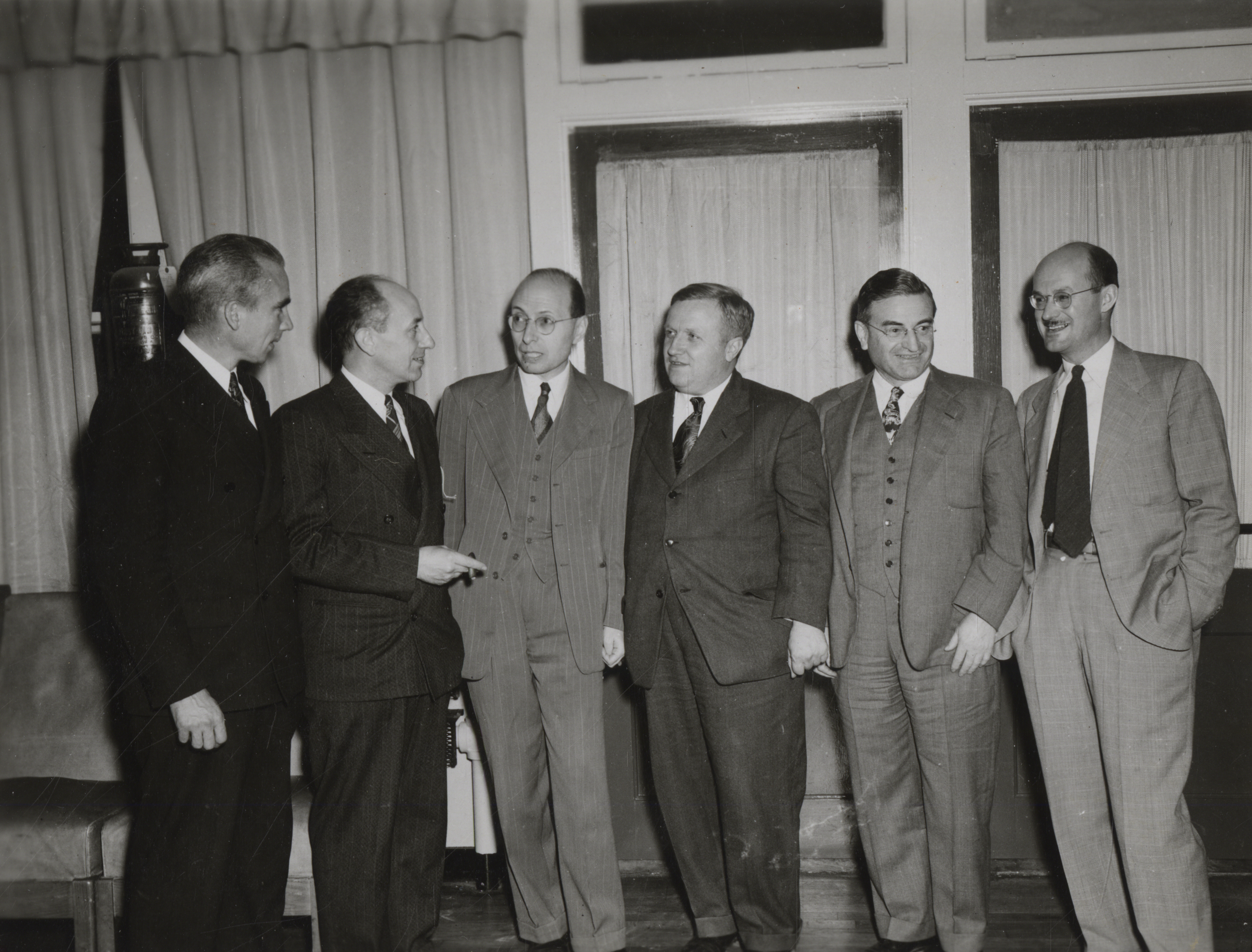
Spedding (third from right) poses with colleagues in Oak Ridge, Tennessee, 1946

After World War II, Spedding founded the Institute for Atomic Research and the Ames Laboratory of the Atomic Energy Commission. He directed the Ames Laboratory from its founding in 1947 until 1968. It was initially established on the grounds of Iowa State College. Permanent buildings were constructed that were opened in 1948 and 1950, and subsequently named Wilhelm Hall and Spedding Hall. Spedding was "universally acknowledged as one of the world’s foremost experts on the identification and separation of rare earths". He developed an ion-exchange method of separating and purifying rare earth elements using ion-exchange resins. He later used ion exchange to separate isotopes of individual elements, including hundreds of grams of almost pure nitrogen-15.

During his career, Spedding published over 260 peer-reviewed papers, and held 22 patents in his own name and jointly with others. Some 88 students received their Ph.D. degree under his supervision. After his retirement in 1972, he authored 60 books. He received the William H. Nichols Award from the American Chemical Society in 1952, the James Douglas Gold Medal from the American Institute of Mining, Metallurgical, and Petroleum Engineers in 1961 and the Francis J. Clamer Medal from the Franklin Institute in 1969. He was nominated several times for the Nobel Prize in chemistry, but never won. An award called the Frank H. Spedding Award is presented at the annual Rare Earth Research Conference.

Spedding suffered a stroke in November 1984, and was hospitalised, but sent home. He died suddenly on 15 December 1984, and was buried in the cemetery at Iowa State University. He was survived by his wife, daughter, and three grandchildren. His papers are housed in the Special Collections Department of Iowa State University.
