= Harley A. Wilhelm =

American chemist (1900–1995)

Harley Wilhelm
- Harley Wilhelm
- Born: August 5, 1900; Ellston, Iowa, U.S.
- Died: October 7, 1995 (aged 95); Story City, Iowa, U.S.
- Education: Drake University (A.B. 1923); Iowa State University (Ph.D. 1931)
- Known for: Ames process
- Scientific career
- Workplaces: Iowa State University; Ames Laboratory
- Thesis: Band spectra produced by certain explosion mixtures (1931)
- Doctoral advisor: W. H. Jennings

Harley A. Wilhelm (August 5, 1900 – October 7, 1995) was an American chemist who helped to establish the United States Department of Energy's Ames Laboratory at Iowa State University. His uranium extraction process helped make it possible for the Manhattan Project to build the first atomic bombs.

== Early life ==
Harley A. Wilhelm was born on a farm near Ellston, Iowa, on August 5, 1900, one of seven children of Bert Clement and Annie Bell Wilhelm. He attended Ellston High School, where he was a varsity athlete as a freshman. He earned all-state athletic honors in his senior year. He graduated from Ellston High School in 1919, and entered Drake University in Des Moines, Iowa, on an athletic scholarship. At Drake he played as a forward on the basketball team and a halfback on the football team. He was also a pitcher on the baseball team. He became interested in chemistry, and was awarded a fellowship to Iowa State College to study it there, but returned to Drake, where he received his Bachelor of Arts (A.B.) degree in 1923.

After graduation, Wilhelm joined the faculty of the Intermountain Union College in Helena, Montana, where he taught chemistry and coached the football team. His coaching efforts were unsuccessful, and he returned to Iowa State as a graduate assistant, becoming an instructor in chemistry in 1929. He earned his Ph.D. in 1931, writing his thesis on "Band spectra produced by certain explosion mixtures" under the supervision of W. H. Jennings. He then joined the Iowa State faculty, becoming an assistant professor in 1940, and associate professor in 1944, and ultimately a full professor in 1945. He continued to play baseball, pitching for Ames Merchant, a semi-professional team for many years.

== Manhattan Project ==
In February 1942, with the United States engaged in World War II, Arthur H. Compton established the Metallurgical Laboratory at the University of Chicago as part of the Manhattan Project, to build nuclear reactors to create plutonium that would be used in atomic bombs. He recruited Frank Spedding from Iowa State College as the head of the Metallurgical Laboratory's Chemistry Division. In turn, Spedding established a branch of the Metallurgical Laboratory at Iowa state College, and recruited Wilhelm as Associate Director to lead the metallurgical research. The intent was that the Iowa State College group would eventually join the rest of the Metallurgical Laboratory in Chicago, but this never occurred, and the Ames Project grew into a laboratory in its own right.

Spedding and Wilhelm began looking for ways to create the uranium metal. That being produced at the time was in the form of a powder, and was highly pyrophoric. It could be pressed and sintered and stored in cans, but to be useful, it needed to be melted and cast. The Ames team found that molten uranium could be cast in a graphite container. Although graphite was known to react with uranium, this could be managed because the carbide formed only where the two touched.

To produce uranium metal, Spedding and Wilhelm tried reducing uranium oxide with hydrogen, but this did not work. They then investigated a process (now known as the Ames process) originally developed by J. C. Goggins and others at the University of New Hampshire in 1926. This involved mixing uranium tetrachloride and calcium metal in a calcium oxide-lined steel pressure vessel (known as a "bomb") and heating it. They were able to reproduce Goggin's results in August 1942, and by September the Ames Laboratory was producing a ton of highly pure uranium metal a day. Starting in July 1943, Mallinckrodt, Union Carbide and DuPont began producing uranium by the Ames process, and Ames phased out its own production by early 1945.

The Ames Laboratory also produced 437 pounds (198 kg) of extremely pure cerium for the cerium sulphide crucibles used by the plutonium metallurgists. Fears that world supplies of uranium were limited led to experiments with thorium, which could be irradiated to produce fissile uranium-233. A calcium reduction process was developed for thorium, and produced some 4,500 pounds (2,000 kg).

== Later life ==
After World War II, Spedding and Wilhelm founded the Institute of Atomic Research and the Ames Laboratory of the Atomic Energy Commission. Wilhelm became its associate director in 1945, serving in that capacity until 1966. He remained the principal scientist and professor of chemistry and metallurgy until he retired in 1970 at the mandatory retirement age of 70. The Ames Laboratory was initially established on the grounds of Iowa State College. Permanent buildings were constructed that were opened in 1948 and 1950, and subsequently named Wilhelm Hall and Spedding Hall respectively in 1986. His work at the Ames Laboratory ranged over a wide range of subjects, from the design of high-speed computers to environmental waste management and materials science. He individually or jointly held over 40 patents relating to chemistry and metallurgy, and 60 relating to atomic energy. He was part of the United States delegation to the 1955 International Conference on the Peaceful Uses of Atomic Energy in Geneva.

Wilhelm received the Eisenman Award from the American Society of Metals in 1962, and the Gold Medal from the American Society of Mechanical Engineers in 1990, but he was more celebrated for his achievements as an athlete. In 1961, he was named one of the 100 greatest athletes in Drake University's history. He was one of 32 Drake alumni athletes who received the first Double D Awards in 1968, and he was inducted into the Iowa Boys High School Basketball Hall of Fame in 1988. In 2006, he was one of 80 basketball players selected as part of Drake University's all-decade teams.

Wilhelm died in the Story City Memorial Hospital on October 7, 1995. He was survived by his daughters, Lorna Livingston, Gretchen Wilhelm and Myrna Elliott, and his son, Max Wilhelm. His wife Orpha Lutton Wilhelm died in 1991.
