= Spinout =

Spinout or Spin Out may refer to:

- Corporate spin-off, also known as a spin-out, a type of corporate action where a company turns a portion of itself into a separate business
- Spinout (driving), failure when braking

== Entertainment ==
- Spinout (film), a 1966 film starring Elvis Presley
  - Spinout (album), a 1966 album by Elvis Presley, a soundtrack to the movie Spinout
  - "Spinout" (song), a 1966 song by Elvis Presley from the movie Spinout
- Spinout (video game), 2008
- Spin Out (film), a 2016 Australian film
