= How Great Thou Art (Elvis Presley album) =

Studio album by Elvis Presley
- Released: February 27, 1967
- Recorded: October 31, 1960 ("Crying in the Chapel"); May 25–27, 1966
- Studio: RCA Studio B (Nashville)
- Genres: Gospel, christian music
- Length: 31:33
- Label: RCA Victor
- Producer: Felton Jarvis

Elvis Presley chronology
Spinout (1966)	How Great Thou Art (1967)	Easy Come, Easy Go (1967)

Singles from How Great Thou Art
- 1. "Crying in the Chapel" Released: April 6, 1965

How Great Thou Art is the ninth studio album by American singer Elvis Presley, released by RCA Victor in February 1967. How Great Thou Art is a gospel album with slow numbers on side A, and fast-paced numbers on side B. The album earned Presley a Grammy Award for Best Sacred Performance, while it charted no. 17 on the Billboard 200 and appeared on the Top Country Albums chart on the top 10.

After the initial success of his films and their respective soundtracks, Presley's movie career began to decline by the mid-1960s. Due to the continued success of his previous gospel recording, His Hand in Mine (1960), and the fact that his 1965 single of "Crying in the Chapel"—a leftover from the 1960 album sessions—became an unexpected major hit, RCA accepted Presley's proposal of a follow-up release. The tracks were recorded in May 1966, and produced by Felton Jarvis with the accompaniment of the Imperials and the Jordanaires.

Following its February 1967 release, How Great Thou Art was certified gold by the Recording Industry Association of America (RIAA). The recording was promoted with a radio special on Palm Sunday that featured its tracks. Subsequent reviews praised Presley's album while its certification was updated to multiple platinum by 2010.

== Background ==
In March 1960, at the end of his career in the United States Army, Elvis Presley returned to recording music. That year, his release Elvis is Back! reached number 2 on the Billboard Top Albums chart, while it topped the UK Albums Chart. Meanwhile, the release of the soundtrack of his film G.I. Blues (1960) topped both Billboard's Top Albums and the UK Albums Chart.

Presley's manager, Colonel Tom Parker, shifted the focus of the singer's career to acting. Presley preferred dramatic roles, but after the flop of Flaming Star (1960) and Wild in the Country (1961), the use of his music in films increased. Presley's next film, Blue Hawaii (1961), became a box-office success, while its soundtrack topped Billboard's Top Albums Chart for 20 weeks. Parker decided to shift the business model to produce films that would sell soundtracks, while the soundtracks would in turn promote the films. Consequentially, Presley stopped recording non-soundtrack albums and grew increasingly unhappy with the quality of the songs, as well as the plots of the films in which he starred. By 1965, Presley's box-office earnings started to decline.

== Production ==
"How Great Thou Art"
The title-track of the album was recorded in four takes

Concurrent with his box-office earnings decline, Presley was insisting that RCA work on a new gospel album, but his requests were rejected each time. As Presley's records failed to match his earlier albums' profits, his 1960 gospel album His Hand in Mine sold well. Meanwhile, the April 1965 release of "Crying in the Chapel", recorded during the His Hand in Mine sessions, reached number 3 on the Billboard Hot 100 chart. RCA and Parker reconsidered Presley's idea and they arranged the date for the next recording sessions. The recordings would be Presley's first non-soundtrack album in more than two years, and the production was assigned to Felton Jarvis, marking his first collaboration with Presley. Chet Atkins, producer and manager of Nashville's RCA Studio B, assigned Jarvis because of Presley's preference to record at night.

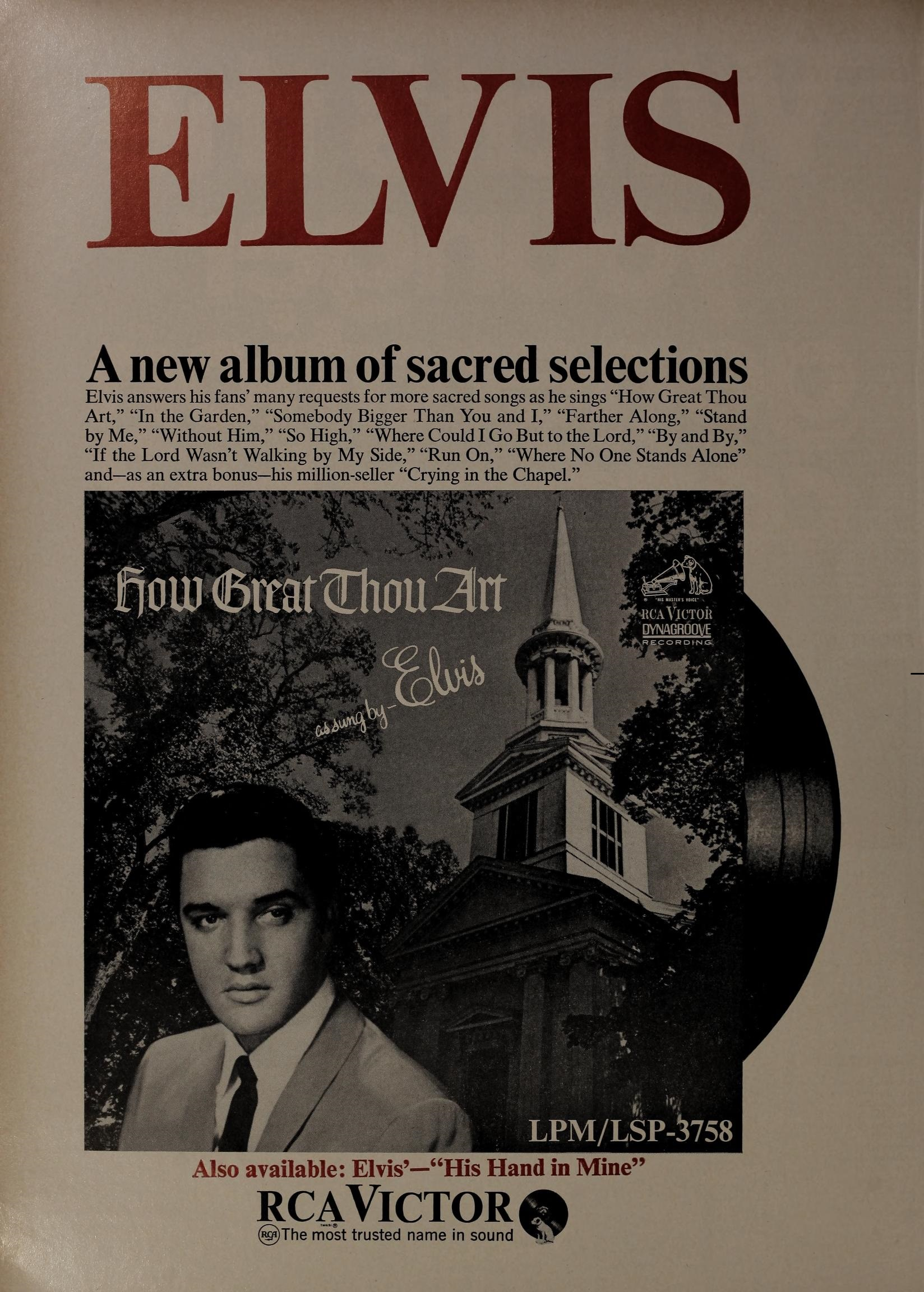
Advertising in Cashbox promoting the release of How Great Thou Art

To prepare his voice, Presley worked with members of his entourage – Charlie Hodge and Sonny West—at Graceland. Together they reviewed the material that Presley's publisher Hill & Range sent, but they settled on recording songs that Presley liked that were not owned by the company. Presley requested that the label hire singer Jimmy Jones to appear on the album, but he could not be located by Parker's assistant nor Hill & Range's representative Freddy Bienstock. Presley's management then hired the singer's favorite gospel quartet: The Imperials, led by Jake Hess. Additionally, the Jordanaires and a backing group that consisted of Millie Kirkham and two other female session backup singers completed the vocal section. According to the Jordanaires, member Ray Walker suggested that Presley record the song "How Great Thou Art" based on the success of George Beverly Shea's recording that was used on Billy Graham's events. Meanwhile, Presley's assistant Charlie Hodge claimed Presley decided to record the song after he played a version by Sons of the Pioneers for Presley. The selected songs that were in the public domain were rearranged to meet requirements to register the copyright by Presley's management.

The recording of How Great Thou Art took place in May 1966. On the first day, May 25, 1966, Presley practiced the songs with the backup singers on the piano. After two hours, he started the first take of "Run On". Presley sang the song using the same vocal techniques the Golden Gate Quartet used on their performances of the song. The first number took seven takes, then Presley moved to the title-track. How Great Thou Art was recorded in four takes. Jerry Schilling, a friend of Presley who was present at the session, remarked that after the last take the singer was "drained" and that he "almost fainted". He continued with the traditional song "Stand By Me", which Presley had difficulty singing. Jarvis worked with him repeating the takes several times so Presley could use the vibrato needed to reach the falsetto range. After the eleventh take, Presley moved to a number often sung by Hess, "Where No One Stands Alone". The next day, they recorded "So High", "Farther Along" and "In the Garden". The third night of recording, May 27, was set to be the last one for the album since the Imperials were scheduled to leave for the start of their Canadian tour. Presley recorded "If the Lord Wasn't Walking by My Side" as a duet with Hess. Additionally, the session produced "Somebody Bigger Than You and I", "Without Him", and "Where Could I Go But to the Lord". The production of the record placed the slower numbers on the A side while the B side was dedicated to faster-paced songs. As "Crying in the Chapel" had not yet appeared on an album release, the slow-tempo song was included as a bonus track to close the B side. The album cover features the church and steeple of the First Church of Christ of Sandwich, Massachusetts.

== Release and reception ==
How Great Thou Art was released in February 1967. Billboard qualified the release as "great", while the review remarked that the songs pointed to the where Presley "got his style of singing". Meanwhile, Cashbox felt that Presley sang the tunes in a "feelingful, sincere manner". The St. Petersburg Times called it a "considerable success", while The News Journal considered it Presley "at his versatile best". The Courier-Post felt that the songs of the A-side were "good", but that Presley "fails" on the flipside. The reviewer concluded that How Great Thou Art was "good listening", and that Crying in the Chapel presented Presley in "near his best". Journal & Courier wrote that the album was "well sung", while El Paso Times mentioned Presley's transition from "teenage to later pop", and it considered the style of the album "smooth and acceptable". The album reached number 18 on the Billboard 200 and number seven on the Top Country Albums chart. On March 19, 1967, on Palm Sunday, Parker made a deal for the album to be played on 276 stations across the United States, while in cases six stations on the same area joined the program. Parker gave three minutes for the sponsoring of local charities to the announcers of each station and a national spot for the Red Cross during the broadcast. The same year, on December 3, Parker included songs of the album in a similar Christmas broadcast that comprehended 2,000 stations. By February 1968, the album was certified gold by the RIAA.

Professional ratings
Review scores
Source	Rating
AllMusic	4/5 stars
MusicHound	3.5/5 stars
The Rolling Stone Album Guide	5/5 stars
Rough Guides	5/5 stars

In March 1968, at the 10th Annual Grammy Awards, the album won the category for Best Sacred Performance, and was Presley's first win at the Grammy Awards. By the following decade, the title-track became part of his usual repertoire in concerts. One 1974 performance, for the album Elvis Recorded Live on Stage in Memphis, would also win the Grammy for this category, as would his 1972 album, He Touched Me. All three Grammys won by Presley during his lifetime were for his gospel/sacred recordings.

In August 1977, James Blackwood sang (with the Stamps) the How Great Thou Art at Presley's funeral. In 1988, RCA reissued the record on compact disc. The RIAA certification for How Great Thou Art was updated to platinum on March 27, 1992. In 2008, Sony Music released a remastered version of How Great Thou Art that included three bonus tracks. In 2010, the Presley collector label Follow That Dream released a version that also contained all the outtakes from the recording sessions. The same year, the album certification was upgraded to 3× Platinum on October 13.

The Rolling Stone Album Guide rated the release with five stars out of five. The publication remarked the "splendid" vocal support that Presley received, as the guide hailed as "effective on the dramatic". MusicHound rated it with three-and-a-half bones out of five. Allmusic gave the release four stars out of five. Critic John Bush remarked the "different conceptions" that each side of the record offered: The reviewer considered the opening "very high church" and traditional, while he praised the flipside as "a far more exciting proposition" with the use of "rocking" or "swinging pianos" with "breakneck tempos".

== Track listing ==
=== Original release ===
Side one
No.	Title	Writer(s)	Recording date	Length
1.	"How Great Thou Art"	Stuart K. Hine	May 25, 1966	3:00
2.	"In the Garden"	C. Austin Miles	May 26, 1966	3:11
3.	"Somebody Bigger Than You and I"	Hy Heath, Sonny Burke, Johnny Lange	May 27, 1966	2:25
4.	"Farther Along"	Traditional; arranged by Elvis Presley	May 26, 1966	4:04
5.	"Stand by Me"	Traditional; arranged by Elvis Presley	May 25, 1966	2:26
6.	"Without Him"	Mylon LeFevre	May 27, 1966	2:27

Side two
No.	Title	Writer(s)	Recording date	Length
1.	"So High"	Traditional; arranged by Elvis Presley	May 26, 1966	1:56
2.	"Where Could I Go But to the Lord"	James B. Coats	May 27, 1966	3:36
3.	"By and By"	Traditional; arranged by Elvis Presley	May 26, 1966	1:49
4.	"If the Lord Wasn't Walking by My Side"	Henry Slaughter	May 27, 1966	1:36
5.	"Run On"	Traditional; arranged by Elvis Presley	May 25, 1966	2:21
6.	"Where No One Stands Alone"	Mosie Lister	May 25, 1966	2:42
7.	"Crying in the Chapel"	Artie Glenn	October 31, 1960	2:26

=== 2008 reissue bonus tracks ===
No.	Title	Writer(s)	Recording date	Length
14.	"You'll Never Walk Alone"	Oscar Hammerstein II, Richard Rodgers	September 11, 1967	2:43
15.	"We Call on Him"	Fred Karger, Sid Wayne, Ben Weisman	September 11, 1967	2:31
16.	"Who Am I?"	Charles Rusty Goodman	February 22, 1969	2:07

=== 2010 Follow That Dream reissue ===
Disc One

Original album
No.	Title	Length
1.	"How Great Thou Art"	3:02
2.	"In the Garden"	3:11
3.	"Somebody Bigger Than You and I"	2:27
4.	"Farther Along"	4:06
5.	"Stand by Me"	2:29
6.	"Without Him"	2:32
7.	"So High"	1:59
8.	"By and By"	3:38
9.	"Where Could I Go but To the Lord"	1:52
10.	"If the Lord Wasn't Walking by My Side"	1:38
11.	"Run On"	2:23
12.	"Where No One Stands Alone"	2:44
13.	"Crying in The Chapel"	2:28

Bonus songs
No.	Title	Length
14.	"You'll Never Walk Alone"	2:46
15.	"We Call on Him"	2:34
16.	"If Every Day Was Like Christmas"	2:57

First takes
No.	Title	Length
17.	"How Great Thou Art" (takes 1 & 2)	3:31
18.	"Somebody Bigger Than You and I" (takes 1,3,11)	4:31
19.	"Stand by Me" (takes 1 & 2)	2:55
20.	"Without Him" (take 1)	3:04
21.	"So High" (take 1)	2:16
22.	"By and By" (take 4)	1:53
23.	"If the Lord Wasn't Walking by My Side" (take 1)	1:53
24.	"Run On" (takes 1 & 2)	4:51
25.	"Where No One Stands Alone" (takes 1 & 4 spliced)	3:07
26.	"You'll Never Walk Alone" (take 1)	5:35
27.	"We Call on Him" (takes 1 & 2)	2:55

Disc two

May 1966 sessions
No.	Title	Length
1.	"Run On" (takes 3–6)	5:01
2.	"Stand by Me" (takes 5–7)	3:43
3.	"Stand by Me" (takes 9 & 10)	4:19
4.	"Where No One Stands Alone" (takes 2, 3 & wp 1)	4:42
5.	"Where No One Stands Alone" (wp takes 2, 3 & 5)	2:22
6.	"So High" (takes 2 & 3)	2:21
7.	"Farther Along" (takes 1& 2)	3:57
8.	"By and By" (takes1, 2, 3, 4 (fs), 5 & 7)	4:28
9.	"By and By" (takes 8 & 9)	2:33
10.	"In the Garden" (takes 1–3)	5:03
11.	"Somebody Bigger Than You and I" (take 12)	2:42
12.	"Somebody Bigger Than You and I" (takes14 (fs), 15 & wp 5)	4:39
13.	"Without Him" (takes 4 & 8)	2:49
14.	"Without Him" (takes 11, 13 & 14)	4:35
15.	"If the Lord Wasn't Walking by My Side" (takes 2–4)	3:04
16.	"If the Lord Wasn't Walking by My Side" (take 6)	1:49

June 1966 sessions
No.	Title	Length
17.	"If Every Day Was Like Christmas" (takes 1 & 2, undubbed master)	3:27

September 1966 sessions
No.	Title	Length
18.	"We Call on Him" (takes 4 & 5)	3:11
19.	"We Call on Him" (take 7)	2:48
20.	"We Call on Him" (take 8)	2:36
21.	"You'll Never Walk Alone" (take 2)	3:54
22.	"You'll Never Walk Alone" (takes 3, 4, 6 & 8)	4:47

== Personnel ==
- Elvis Presley – vocals; piano on 2008 reissue bonus track "You'll Never Walk Alone"
- The Jordanaires – vocals
- The Imperials – vocals
- Millie Kirkham – vocals
- Dolores Edgin – vocals
- June Page – vocals
- Boots Randolph – saxophone
- Rufus Long – saxophone
- Scotty Moore – guitar
- Chip Young – guitar
- Charlie McCoy – guitar, bass, harmonica
- Pete Drake – pedal steel guitar
- Floyd Cramer – piano
- David Briggs – piano, organ
- Henry Slaughter – piano, organ
- Bob Moore – double bass
- Henry Strzelecki – double bass
- D. J. Fontana – drums, tambourine
- Buddy Harman – drums, timpani

== Charts ==
Weekly chart performance of How Great Thou Art
Charts (1967)	Peak position
US Billboard 200	18
US Top Country Albums (Billboard)	7

== Accolades ==
Awards for How Great Thou Art
Year	Organization	Award	Result	Ref.
1968	10th Annual Grammy Awards	Best Sacred Performance	Won	

== Certifications ==
Certifications and sales for How Great Thou Art
Region	Certification	Certified units/sales
United States (RIAA)	3× Platinum	3,000,000^{^}
^{^} Shipments figures based on certification alone.

== See also ==
- Carl Boberg, author of the Swedish poem "O Store Gud"
