= All That I Am (Elvis Presley song) =

- Picture sleeve for U.S. vinyl single, with "Spinout" in smaller font

Single by Elvis Presley

from the album Spinout
- A-side: "Spinout" (released as B-side in many editions and/or countries)
- Released: September 13, 1966
- Length: 2:15
- Songwriter(s): Sid Tepper; Roy C. Bennett

Elvis Presley singles chronology
"Love Letters" (1966)	"Spinout" / "All That I Am'" (1966)	"If Every Day Was Like Christmas" (1966)

"All That I Am" is a song first recorded by Elvis Presley as part of his 1966 album Spinout. It was released in 1966 on a single with "Spinout", the title song from the same movie, on the opposite side. Both sides charted on the Billboard Hot 100: "Spinout" peaked at number 40 and then "All That I Am" at number 41. "All That I Am" also charted on the Billboard Easy Listening chart, spending there 16 weeks in total and peaking at number 9 on the week of November 19, 1966. The single "All That I Am" spent eight weeks on the UK Singles Chart, peaking at number 18 on the week of October 16, 1966.

== Charts ==
Chart (1966)	Peak position
UK Singles Chart (Official Charts Company)	18
US Billboard Hot 100	41
US Billboard Easy Listening	9
