= Ronnie Hawkins =

American-Canadian singer (1935–2022)

Ronnie Hawkins OC
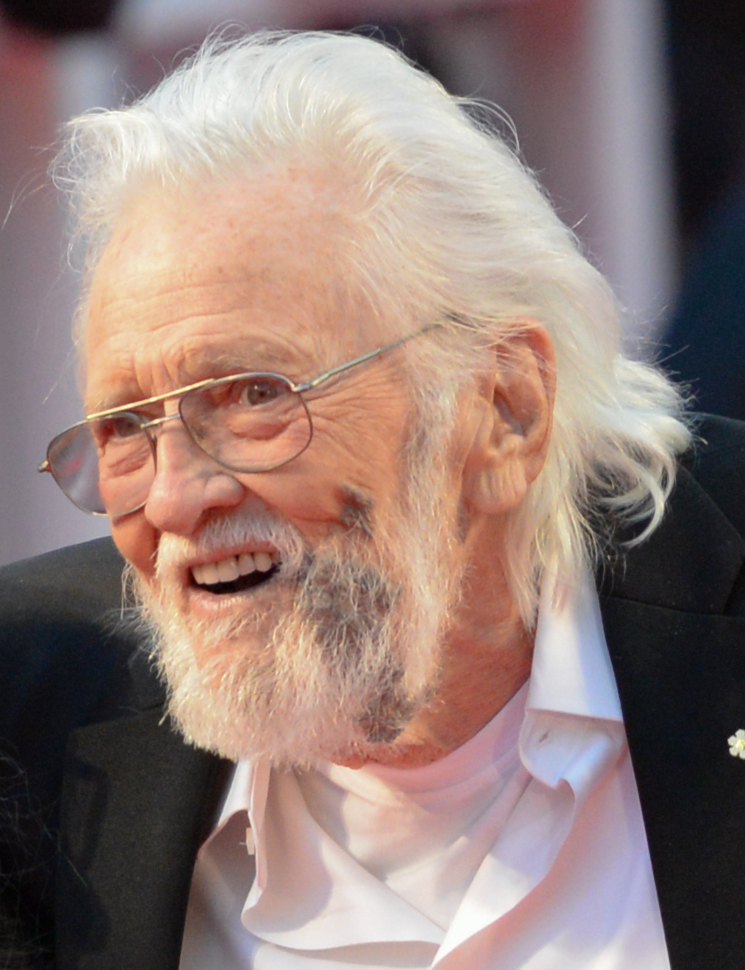
- Hawkins at the 2019 Toronto International Film Festival

Background information
- Born: Ronald Cornett Hawkins; January 10, 1935; Huntsville, Arkansas, U.S.
- Died: May 29, 2022 (aged 87) Peterborough, Ontario, Canada
- Genres: Rockabilly; rock and roll; R&B; country; bluegrass
- Occupations: Singer; songwriter
- Years active: 1956–2022
- Labels: Roulette; Columbia; Cotillion; Monument; Atlantic; Polydor; Pye; United Artists; Epic; Cosmic Cowboy
- Spouse: Wanda Hawkins (m. 1961)
- Website: ronniehawkins.com

Ronald Cornett Hawkins OC (January 10, 1935 – May 29, 2022) was an American rock and roll singer, long based in Canada, whose career spanned 66 years. His career began in Arkansas, United States, where he was born and raised. He found success in Ontario, Canada, and lived there for most of his life. Hawkins was an institution of the Ontario music scene for over 40 years. He was influential in the evolution of rock music in Canada.

Also known as "Rockin' Ronnie", "Rompin Ronnie", "Mr. Dynamo", or "the Hawk", he was one of the key players in the 1960s rock scene in Toronto. He performed all across North America and recorded more than 25 albums. His hit songs include covers of Chuck Berry's "Thirty Days" (retitled "Forty Days") and Young Jessie's "Mary Lou", a song about a gold digger. Other well-known recordings are a cover of Bo Diddley's "Who Do You Love?" (without the question mark), "Hey! Bo Diddley", and "Susie Q", which was written by his cousin, rockabilly artist Dale Hawkins.

Hawkins was a talent scout and mentor of the musicians he recruited for his band, the Hawks. Roy Buchanan was an early Hawks guitarist on the song "Who Do You Love". The most successful of his students were those who left to form The Band. Robbie Lane and the Disciples made their name opening for Ronnie Hawkins and the Hawks at the Yonge Street bars in Toronto, and eventually became his backing band. Others he had recruited later formed Janis Joplin's Full Tilt Boogie Band, Crowbar, Bearfoot, and Skylark. Hawkins was still playing 150 engagements a year in his 60s.

== Early life ==
Hawkins was born on January 10, 1935, in Huntsville, Arkansas, the son of Flora (née Cornett), a schoolteacher, and Jasper Hawkins, a barber. In 1945, the family, which included Hawkins's older sister Winifred, moved to Fayetteville, where Hawkins was educated in the city's public schools, graduating from Fayetteville High School in 1952. Musicianship ran in Hawkins's family; Hawkins's father, uncles, and cousins had toured the honky-tonk circuit in Arkansas and Oklahoma in the 1930s and 1940s. His uncle Delmar "Skipper" Hawkins, a road musician, had moved to California around 1940 and joined cowboy singing star Roy Rogers's band, the Sons of the Pioneers. Hawkins' cousin, Dale Hawkins, the earliest white performer to sing at the Apollo Theater in Harlem and the Regal Theater in Chicago, recorded the rhythm and blues song "Suzie Q" in 1957. Beginning at age 11, Ronnie Hawkins sang at local fairs and before he was a teenager shared a stage with Hank Williams. He recalled that Williams was too drunk to perform, and his band, the Drifting Cowboys, invited members of the audience to get on the stage and sing. Hawkins accepted the invitation and sang some Burl Ives songs he knew.

As a teenager, Hawkins ran bootleg liquor from Missouri to the dry counties of Oklahoma in his modified Ford Model A, sometimes making $300 a day. He claimed in later years that he continued the activity until he was 19 or 20, and that it was how he made the money to buy into nightclubs. He had already formed his first band, the Hawks, when he graduated from high school in 1952, following which he studied physical education at the University of Arkansas, where in 1956 he dropped out just a few credits short of graduation.

Hawkins then enlisted in the United States Army, but he was required to serve only six months, having already completed ROTC training. Soon after his arrival at Fort Sill in Oklahoma for Army Basic Combat Training, he was having a drink at the Amvets club when an African American quartet began to play their music. Hearing the first notes so stirred him that he jumped onto the stage and started singing. "It sounded like something between the blues and rockabilly ... me being a hayseed and those guys playing a lot funkier." The experience caused Hawkins to realize what kind of music he really wanted to play, and he joined the four black musicians, who renamed themselves the Blackhawks.

The group had been performing jazz/blues music similar to Cab Calloway's music of the 1940s, and Hawkins sought to introduce contemporary influences to their repertoire. With another new member, blues saxophonist A.C. Reed, they created some of the South's most dynamic music sounds. "[I]nstead of doing a kind of rockabilly that was closer to country music, I was doing rockabilly that was closer to soul music, which was exactly what I liked." The band encountered prejudice, as many white people in the American South of the 1950s could not accept an integrated band and considered rock 'n' roll and rhythm and blues the devil's music.

The Blackhawks disbanded when his enlistment ended. Hawkins went back to Fayetteville, and two days later, he got a call from Sun Records, which wanted him to front the house session band. By the time he got to Memphis, though, the group had already broken up. Nevertheless, he took advantage of the opportunity to cut two demonstration records, Lloyd Price's "Lawdy Miss Clawdy" and Hank Williams's "A Mansion on the Hill", but the recordings attracted no attention. The demo session guitarist, Jimmy Ray "Luke" Paulman, suggested that Hawkins join him at his home in Helena, Arkansas, in the heart of the Mississippi Delta region, a hotbed of blues, rhythm and blues, and country music, an offer which he eagerly accepted.

Immediately upon arriving in Helena, Hawkins and Paulman found Paulman's brother George (standup bass) and their cousin Willard "Pop" Jones (piano) and formed a band they named the Hawks. Drummer Levon Helm, who had grown up in nearby Turkey Scratch, Arkansas, first played with the group at the Delta Supper Club in early 1957 when George Paulman invited him to sit in them for their closing set. Helm reminisced years later that Hawkins, accompanied by Luke Paulman, drove his Model A out to the Helm's cotton farm, arriving in a cloud of dust to talk to Helm's parents. Helm remembered him as "a big ol' boy in tight pants, sharp shoes, and a pompadour hanging down his forehead." Helm listened to Hawkins negotiate an agreement with his parents, who insisted that he graduate from high school before he could join the Hawks and go to Canada. Helm practiced diligently on a makeshift drum kit to improve his skills, and when he graduated in May, he was good enough to play drums in the band.

Hawkins's live act included back flips and a "camel walk" that preceded Michael Jackson's similar moonwalk by three decades. His stage persona gained him the monikers "Rompin' Ronnie" and "Mr. Dynamo". Hawkins also owned and operated the Rockwood Club in Fayetteville, where some of rock and roll's earliest pioneers came to play, including Jerry Lee Lewis, Carl Perkins, Roy Orbison, and Conway Twitty.

With Helm's graduation from high school, he joined the Hawks and they went to Canada, where the group was successful. On April 13, 1959, they auditioned for Morris Levy, owner of Roulette Records in New York. Only four hours later, the band entered the studio and recorded their first tracks. The band's first single, "Forty Days", was a barely disguised derivative of Chuck Berry's "Thirty Days" with the song "Mary Lou" by Young Jessie on the B-side; it reached number 26 on the US pop charts, becoming Hawkins's biggest hit.

After spending nearly three months in Canada, the band returned to the South, with their base in Hawkins' home town of Fayetteville. The band's performances in the Southern states were mostly one night or short-run performances in Arkansas, Texas, Oklahoma, and Tennessee. Helm loved to drive and would take the band two to three hundred miles to the next show in Hawkins' old Chevy, which Hawkins eventually replaced with a Cadillac towing a trailer containing their equipment.

== Career ==
Hawkins and the group had begun touring Canada in 1958 as the Ron Hawkins Quartet on the recommendation of Conway Twitty, who told him Canadian audiences wanted to hear rockabilly. Their bassist George Paulman was abusing liquor and pills, so Hawkins left him behind, and the band played without a bass on their first tour of Ontario. Their first gig was at the Golden Rail Tavern in Hamilton, Ontario, where according to booking agent Harold Kudlets all the bartenders quit when they heard the band's sound and saw Hawkins's stunts on stage. In 1959, he performed a number of live shows in the country and signed a five-year contract with Roulette Records. Working out of Toronto, Ronnie Hawkins and the Hawks recorded the LP Ronnie Hawkins in 1959, and with Fred Carter, Jr. taking Jimmy Ray "Luke" Paulman's place on lead guitar, they cut another LP, Mr. Dynamo, the next year, both of them recorded on the Roulette label.

Hawkins subsequently moved to Canada, becoming a permanent resident in 1964. When he first came to Ontario, Hawkins performed at places like the Grange Tavern in Hamilton, where Conway Twitty got his start, and made it his home base. In Toronto, where the Hawks dominated the local scene, Hawkins opened his own night club, the Hawk's Nest, on the second floor of Le Coq d'Or Tavern on Yonge street, playing there for months at a time. After the move to Canada, the Hawks, with the exception of drummer Levon Helm, dropped out of Hawkins's band. Their vacancies were filled by Southwest Ontarians Robbie Robertson, Rick Danko, Richard Manuel, and Garth Hudson.

David Clayton-Thomas, a Canadian and future lead vocalist of the American group Blood, Sweat & Tears, said he heard the Hawks when he got out of prison in 1962: "We young musicians would sit there by the bar at Le Coq d'Or and just hang on every note." This version of the Hawks, wearing mohair suits and razor-cut hair, were the top group among those who played Le Coq d'Or, a rowdy establishment at the center of the action on the Yonge Street strip in Toronto. They were able to stay out of most of the bar fights that broke out there almost every night.

Robbie Robertson wrote in his 2016 memoir Testimony about how his band the Suedes and he had opened for the Hawks at the Dixie Arena in the west end of Toronto when he was 15. He described Hawkins spinning, flipping, and camel walking when Jimmy Ray "Luke" Paulman launched into a solo on his lead guitar, then tumbling and landing at Paulman's feet. He said of the show, "It was the most violent, dynamic, primitive rock 'n' roll I had ever witnessed, and it was addictive." It was also the first time he saw Levon Helm, whom he described as a "young beam of light on drums" at the center of it all.

The Hawks were playing at Le Coq d'Or for a few more weeks, and Robertson hung around them as much as possible, hoping he could absorb some of their southern "mojo". One afternoon, he overheard Hawkins say he needed some new songs, since they were going into the studio to record the next month. Hoping to ingratiate himself, Robertson stayed up all night and wrote two songs, "Someone Like You" and "Hey Boba Lu", and played them for Hawkins the next day. Hawkins was impressed and recorded both of them for his new album, Mr Dynamo.

A year later in 1960, Robertson pawned his prized 1957 Fender Stratocaster to buy a bus ticket from Toronto to Fayetteville, Arkansas, to audition for a job with the Hawks, "the most wicked rock 'n' roll band around". Levon Helm met Robertson at the Greyhound bus station and initiated him into the ways of the Deep South. This was Robertson's first time in the South, and he was hoping to take the place of Fred Carter, Jr., who had played with Hawkins's cousin, Dale Hawkins, and Roy Orbison. The band went to Helm's home town of Helena in the Mississippi Delta, where Robertson spent some time at Helm's family farm.

Helm and Robertson returned to the Rainbow Inn, a local motel in which Hawkins had ensconced the band, and practiced songs from the Hawks' repertoire. The motel was owned by a local ferry operator, Charlie Halbert, who had helped many musicians just starting out in the business, including Conway Twitty and Elvis Presley. When Hawkins offered him the job, Robertson asked how much he would be paid, and Hawkins responded, "Well, son, you won't make much money, but you'll get more pussy than Frank Sinatra." Hawkins, with Helm in tow, then went to England to promote his new record, where they met Eddie Cochran and Gene Vincent, who were on tour there. Meanwhile, still at the Rainbow Inn, Robertson tried to learn as much of the band's repertoire as he could, in an environment that he recalled as "rockabilly boot camp".

Before leaving for England, Hawkins took Robertson to the Delta Supper Club, a notorious hangout in West Helena, where an irate patron had chainsawed the bar down the middle. While waiting for Hawkins's and Helm's return, Robertson practiced, listening to stacks of records he had bought in Memphis with his first week's paycheck. His haul of music included records by Ray Charles, bluesmen Howlin' Wolf, Muddy Waters, B. B. King, Junior Parker, and T-Bone Walker, rockabilly singer and guitarist Warren Smith, and gospel singer Mahalia Jackson. When Hawkins and his new Hawks lineup recorded the album Mojo Man in New York City in 1961, Robertson's lead guitar work showed the influence of other Chicago bluesmen such as Buddy Guy and Otis Rush as well.

Along with Helm, all the Hawks left Hawkins in 1964 to form a group which came to be named the Band. The decision came after Hawkins tried to prevent Rick Danko's girlfriend from coming to the group's shows. Hawkins wanted the group to mingle with the crowd, and Danko wanted to sit with her instead. Other issues included diverging musical interests and pay. Hawkins was often absent from shows, leaving the Hawks to play without him. Levon felt they should be paid more when Hawkins didn't show up. There was a confrontation and things came to a head. They went to work for Bob Dylan in 1965, touring with him for a year, and were his backup band on The Basement Tapes. Hawkins continued to perform and record, and did a few tours in Europe.

In December 1969, Hawkins hosted John Lennon and Yoko Ono for a stay at his home in Mississauga, Ontario, during the couple's campaign to promote world peace. Lennon signed his erotic "Bag One" lithographs during his stay there. Lennon also did a radio promo for a Hawkins single, a version of The Clovers song "Down in the Alley". Hawkins later rode with them on a train to Ottawa to see then-prime minister Pierre Trudeau. Lennon also enlisted Hawkins as a peace ambassador, and Hawkins traveled to the border of China and Hong Kong with journalist Ritchie Yorke bearing an anti-war message.

In 1970 Hawkins recorded at FAME Studios in Muscle Shoals, Alabama, laying down tracks for an ultimately unproduced album entitled Ronnie Hawkins. Among the studio musicians was Duane Allman, whose backing led two tracks from the session to be included on the Duane Allman An Anthology Volume II, released in 1974: Carl Perkins' rockabilly hit Matchbox, and the Don Gibson country & western tune Don't Tell Me Your Troubles, featuring Allman on dobro. Four other tracks from that album were also included on Skydog, a 2016 Duane Allman retrospective: "One More Night," "Will the Circle Be Unbroken," "Down in the Alley," and "Who Do You Love".

In the early 1970s, Hawkins noticed guitarist Pat Travers performing in Ontario nightclubs and was so impressed by the young musician that he invited him to play in his band. Travers joined the group, but balked when Hawkins told him he wanted him to play "old '50s and '60s rockabilly tunes". Years later, Travers told an interviewer, "he wanted me to play them exactly the same, same sound, same picking, same everything. For a 19-, 20-year-old kid, that wasn't exactly what I wanted to do. But he said, 'You can do this, son, and you'll be better than a hundred guitar players, because this is where it all comes from. You need to know this stuff. It's like fundamental.' And he was right." Travers later had a successful recording career and became an influential guitarist in the 1970s hard rock genre.

In 1975, Bob Dylan cast Hawkins to play the role of "Bob Dylan" in the movie, Renaldo and Clara. The following year, he was a featured performer at the Band's Thanksgiving Day farewell concert at the Winterland Ballroom in San Francisco, which was documented in the 1978 film The Last Waltz. Robbie Robertson said of it in 2020, "If there was anything wrong that night, it was that the cocaine wasn't very good." Hawkins sampled some of the powder and told the other performers that there was so much flour and sugar in it that they would be "sneezing biscuits" for three months afterward. Hawkin's 1984 LP, Making It Again, garnered him a Juno Award as Canada's best Country Male Vocalist. In addition to his career as a musician, he become an accomplished actor, hosting his own television show Honky Tonk in the early 1980s and appearing in such films as Michael Cimino's Heaven's Gate alongside his friend Kris Kristofferson, in the action/adventure film Snake Eater, and the ski comedy Copper Mountain starring Alan Thicke and a young Jim Carrey. His version of the song "Mary Lou" was used in the 1989 slasher film, Hello Mary Lou: Prom Night II.

He was profiled in the 1982 television documentary film The Hawk, directed by Martin Kahan.

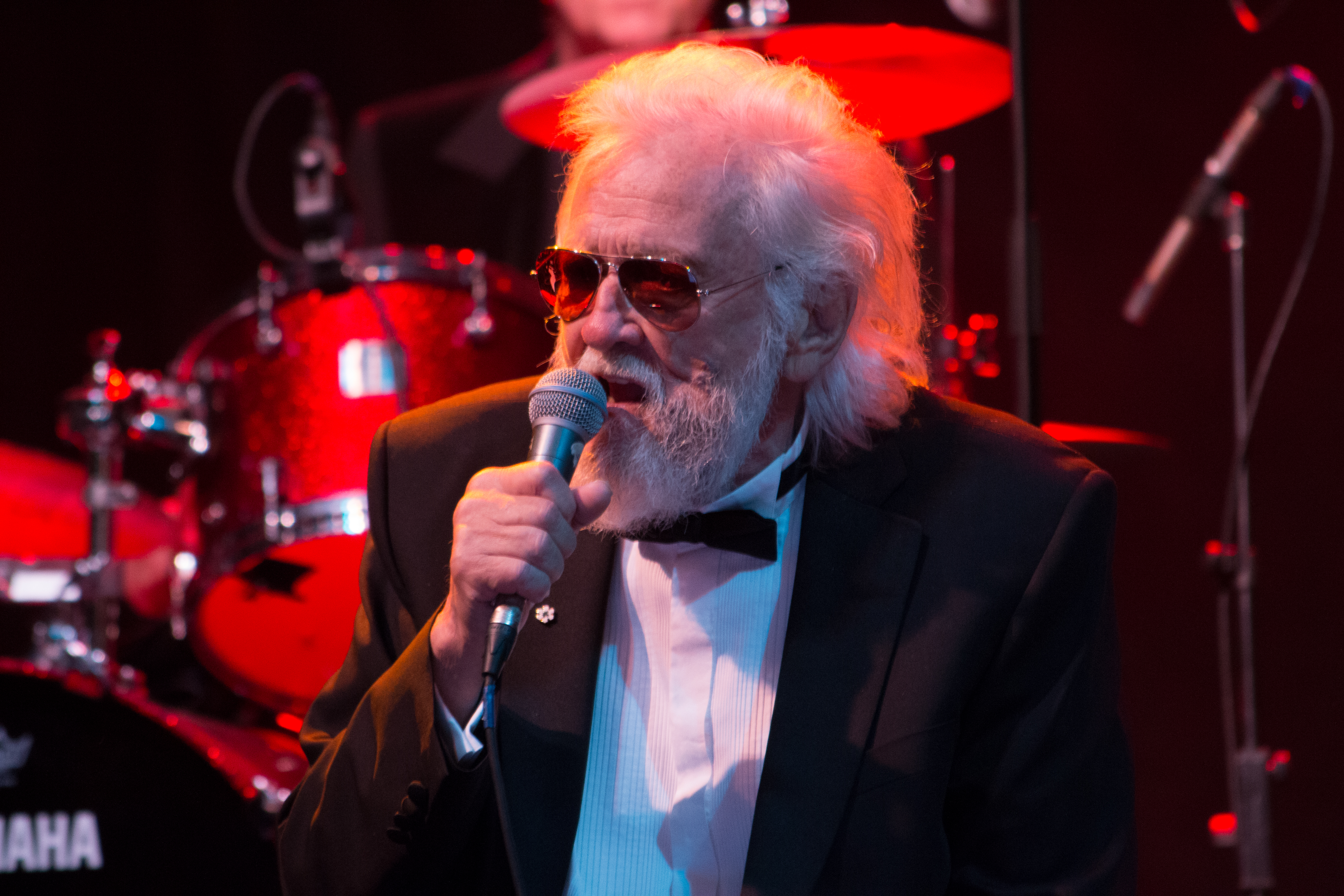
Hawkins in 2014

On January 10, 1995, Hawkins celebrated his 60th birthday by sponsoring a concert at Massey Hall in Toronto, which was documented on the album Let It Rock. The concert featured performances by Hawkins, Carl Perkins, Jerry Lee Lewis, The Band, and Larry Gowan. Canadian musician Jeff Healey sat in on guitar as well. Hawkins's band, the Hawks, or permutations of it, backed the performers. All of the musicians performing that night were collectively dubbed "the Rock 'n' Roll Orchestra".

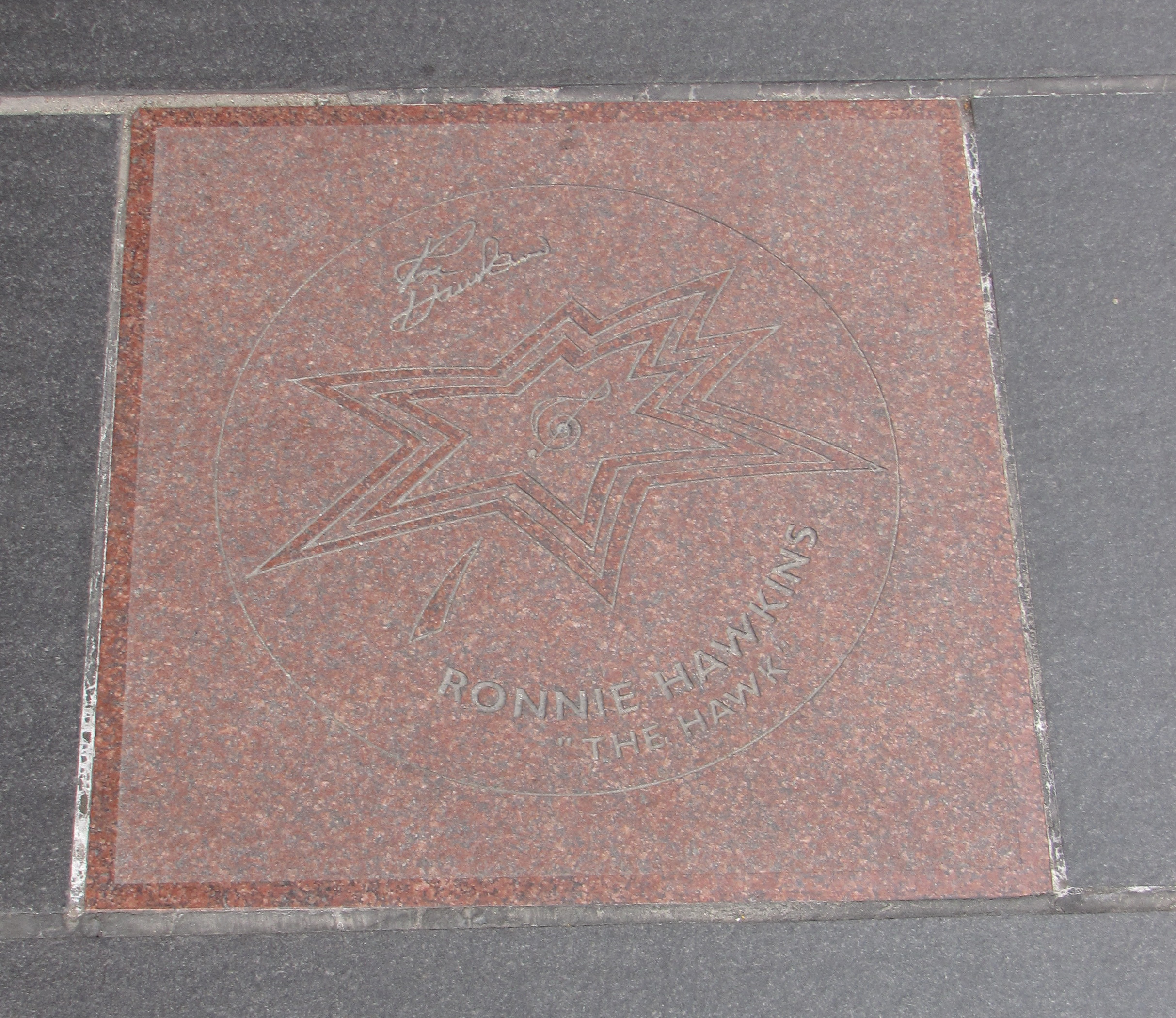
Ronnie Hawkins's star on Canada's Walk of Fame

== Later life ==
In 2002, Hawkins was diagnosed with pancreatic cancer which went into remission, which he attributed in a documentary to a miracle by the 'Big Rocker' and Adam 'Dreamhealer' McLeod, a 16 year old healer from Vancouver. His remission was featured in the 2012 film Ronnie Hawkins: Still Alive and Kicking. In 2017, he moved from Stoney Lake Manor in Douro-Dummer, where he had resided since 1970, to Peterborough, Ontario.

== Death ==
Hawkins died in the early morning of May 29, 2022, at the age of 87. His family said he had been quite ill but gave no specific cause. He is survived by his wife of 60 years, Wanda, their two sons, Ronnie Hawkins Jr. and singer-songwriter Robin Hawkins, who had served as his guitarist since the 1980s and wrote the hit song "Can't Stop Rockin'", and daughter Leah Hawkins, a singer-songwriter who had been his backup singer, and his grandchildren, Robin's four children, Tara, Troy, Jacob and Zack.

== Discography ==
=== Albums ===
Year	Album	CAN	Label	Note
1959	Ronnie Hawkins	—	Roulette	
1960	Mr. Dynamo	—	Roulette	
1960	Folk Ballads of Ronnie Hawkins	—	Roulette	
1961	Sings the Songs of Hank Williams	—	Roulette	
1963	The Best	—	Roulette	
1964	Mojo Man	—	Roulette	
1968	Ronnie Hawkins (aka The Hawk in Winter)	—	Yorkville	
1970	The Best	—	Roulette	
1970	Ronnie Hawkins	12	Cotillion	
1971	The Hawk	91	Cotillion	
1972	Rock and Roll Resurrection	—	Monument	
1974	The Giant of Rock 'N' Roll	—	Monument	
1977	Rockin'	—	Pye	
1979	The Hawk	—	United Artists	
1981	A Legend in His Spare Time	—	Quality	
1982	The Hawk and Rock	—	Trilogy	
1984	Making It Again	—	Epic	
1987	Hello Again ... Mary Lou	—	Epic	
1995	Let It Rock	—	Quality	
2001	Can't Stop Rockin''	—	Sony Music Direct	
2002	Still Cruisin'	—	Hawk	
2021	Live at Fayetteville High School, 1962	—	Cosmic Cowboy	

=== Singles ===
Year	Single	Chart Positions					Album
Year	Single	CAN	CAN AC	CAN Country	AUS	US	Album
1958	"Summertime"	—	—	—	—	—	singles only
1958	"Hey! Bo Diddley"	—	—	—	—	—	singles only
1959	"Forty Days"	4	—	—	—	45	Ronnie Hawkins
1959	"Mary Lou"	6	—	—	—	26	Ronnie Hawkins
1963	"Bo Diddley"	8	—	—	—	117	singles only
1965	"Bluebirds over the Mountain"	8	—	—	—	—	singles only
1965	"Goin' to the River"	34	—	—	—	—	singles only
1970	"Home from the Forest"	60	—	29	—	—	Ronnie Hawkins
1970	"Down in the Alley"	20	—	—	30	75	Ronnie Hawkins
1970	"Bitter Green"	36	—	—	61	118	Ronnie Hawkins
1971	"Patricia"	84	2	38	—	—	The Hawk
1972	"Cora Mae"	71	—	—	—	—	Rock and Roll Resurrection
1973	"Lonesome Town"	—	8	39	—	—	Giant of Rock'n Roll
1981	"(Stuck In) Lodi"	—	7	8	—	—	A Legend in His Spare Time
1983	"Wild Little Willie"	—	—	45	—	—	The Hawk and Rock
1985	"Making It Again"	—	—	44	—	—	Making It Again
1987	"Hello Again Mary Lou"	—	17	39	—	—	Hello Again ... Mary Lou
1995	"Days Gone By"	—	—	51	—	—	Let It Rock
2001	"Can't Stop Rockin'"	33	—	—	—	—	Can't Stop Rockin'
2002	"Friendship"	30	—	—	—	—	Still Cruisin'

== Awards ==
In 2002, October 4 was declared "Ronnie Hawkins Day" by the city of Toronto as he was inducted into Canada's Walk of Fame, in recognition of his lifetime contribution to music and his generous support of the Schizophrenia Society of Ontario and other charitable organizations. He was inducted into the Canadian Music Industry Hall of Fame at the Canadian Music Industry Awards on March 4, 2004. His pioneering contribution to the genre was also recognized by the Rockabilly Hall of Fame.

In 2005, Hawkins was awarded an honorary degree from Laurentian University.

On May 2, 2013, Hawkins was named an Honorary Officer of the Order of Canada. His investiture was held on May 7, 2014. The citation reads:

For his contributions to the development of the music industry in Canada, as a rock and roll musician, and for his support of charitable causes. For more than 50 years, musician Ronnie Hawkins has demonstrated a strong devotion to Canada's music industry. Often referred to as the "father of Canadian rock n' roll", he was a key player in the 1960s rock scene, with his band The Hawks serving as a launching pad for a host of Canadian musicians. In addition to producing scores of singles and albums, he has performed in support of many charitable causes, notably the Peterborough Flood Relief and the Schizophrenia Society of Ontario.

Other awards include a Juno Award for Making it Again in 1984, the Walt Grealis Special Achievement Award from the Canadian Academy of Recording Arts and Sciences, presented at the Juno Awards of 1996 and a Special Achievement Award from the Society of Composers, Authors and Music Publishers (SOCAN) in 2007.
