= Chair step =

Style of marching

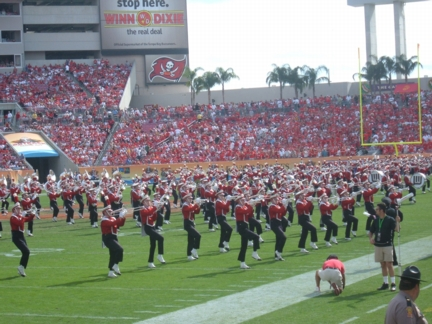
University of Wisconsin Marching Band executing the "stop at the top".

The chair step is a type of high step used by marching bands. This step is named because of the resemblance of the leg in action to a leg's position when sitting in a chair. It is primarily used by bands that brand themselves as traditional-style bands.

The chair step is very visual and emphasizes leg movement with a slight pause in each step, during which the thigh of the action leg may raise to as high as parallel to the ground, with the lower part of the leg and foot remaining perpendicular to the ground. As with the ankle knee step, the toe is the last part of the foot to leave the ground and the first to reconnect.

The move is common among bands in schools affiliated with the Big Ten Conference, as well as bands who are influenced by them, primarily in the Midwestern United States.

== Variations ==
Some bands will bend the leg at the knee at a 90-degree angle during game performances, and a 45-degree angle during parades. Others will use a combination of the two.

Another element of chair step highlighted by many bands is a horn flip, or swagger, that is executed during the march.

The University of Wisconsin Marching Band originated a unique version where the leg is brought up extremely quickly and pauses at the height of the step, coined "stop at the top".

== University bands that use the chair step ==
- Bowling Green State University Marching Band (Bowling Green State University)
- Purdue All-American Marching Band (Purdue University)
- Pennsylvania State University Marching Blue Band (Penn State University)
- Marching Illini (University of Illinois)
- Indiana University Marching Hundred (Indiana University)
- The Pride of Minnesota (University of Minnesota)
- The Ohio State University Marching Band (Ohio State University)
- Michigan State University Spartan Marching Band (Michigan State University)
- Michigan Marching Band (University of Michigan)
- Northwestern Wildcat Marching Band (Northwestern University)
- Iowa State University Cyclone Football "Varsity" Marching Band (Iowa State University)
- Hawkeye Marching Band (University of Iowa)
- University of Nebraska Cornhusker Marching Band (University of Nebraska)
- Band of the Fighting Irish (The University of Notre Dame)
- Marching Chiefs (Florida State University)
- University of California Marching Band (University of California, Berkeley)
- University of Southern California Trojan Marching Band (University of Southern California)
- University of Washington Husky Marching Band (University of Washington)
- California Aggie Marching Band-uh (University of California, Davis)
- University of Pittsburgh Varsity Marching Band (University of Pittsburgh)
- Ohio’s Pride (University of Akron)
- Kansas State University Marching Band (Kansas State University)
- Ohio University Marching 110 (Ohio University)
- CMU Marching Band (Central Michigan University)
- Goin' Band from Raiderland (Texas Tech University)
- Southern Methodist University Mustang Band (Southern Methodist University)
- Marching Mizzou (University of Missouri)

== See also ==
- Glide step
- Ankle knee step
