= Falcon Marching Band =

Marching band of Bowling Green State University

Bowling Green State University Falcon Marching Band
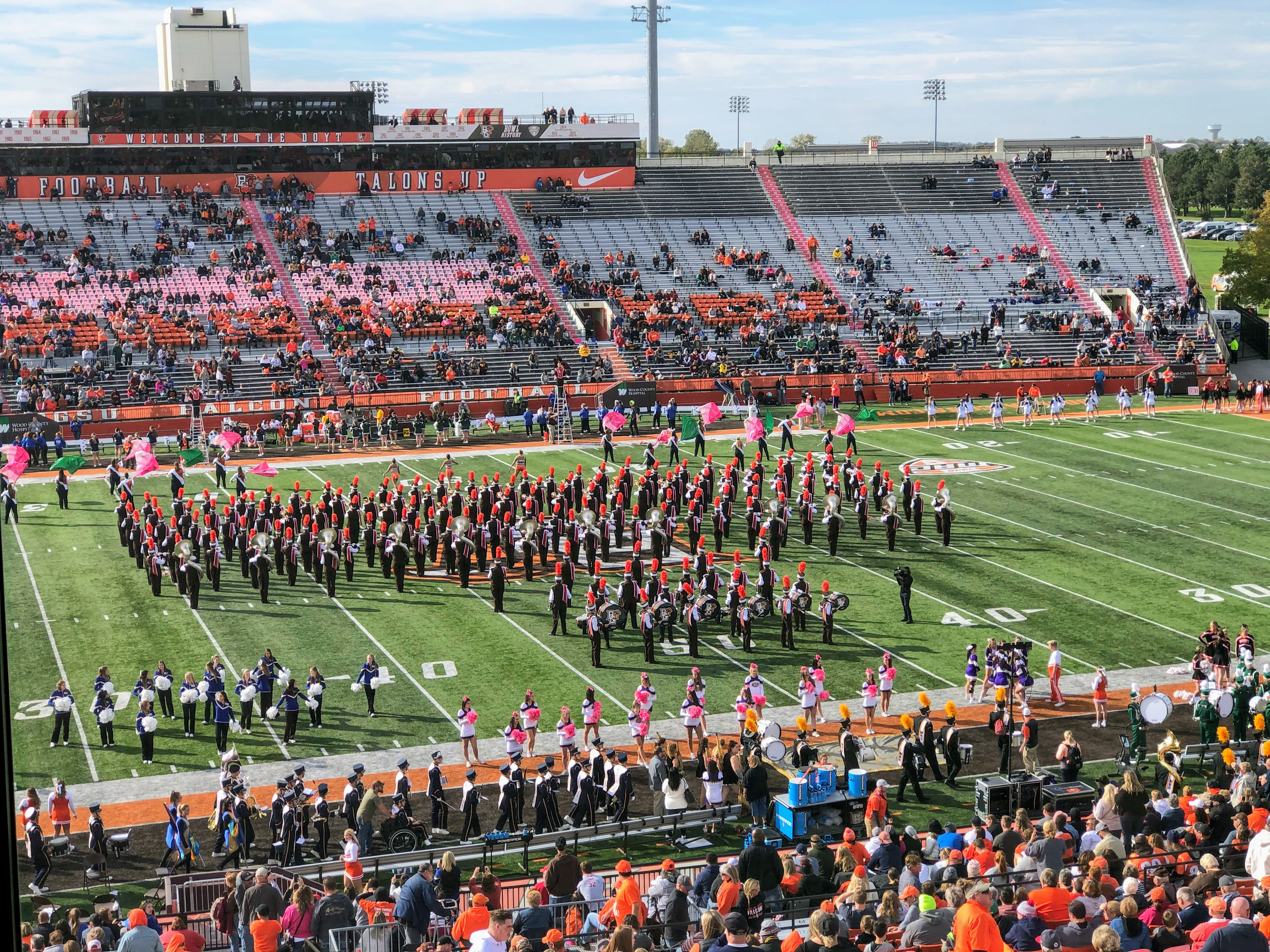
- School: Bowling Green State University
- Location: Bowling Green, Ohio
- Conference: MAC
- Founded: 1923
- Director: Jonathan “Jon” Waters
- Members: 624
- Fight song: "Forward Falcons"

The Falcon Marching Band, known also as the FMB, is the marching band of Bowling Green State University. It features a symphonic sound and Big Ten-style chair step marching. Under the direction of Jonathan “Jon” Waters, marching band is the largest student organization on campus, as well as the largest college marching band in the United States. The band performs at all home football games, which are hosted in Doyt Perry Stadium as well as other various university functions.

The FMB is composed of students from all colleges of the university. Membership is open by audition to students of all class levels and all majors.

== History ==
=== Origins ===
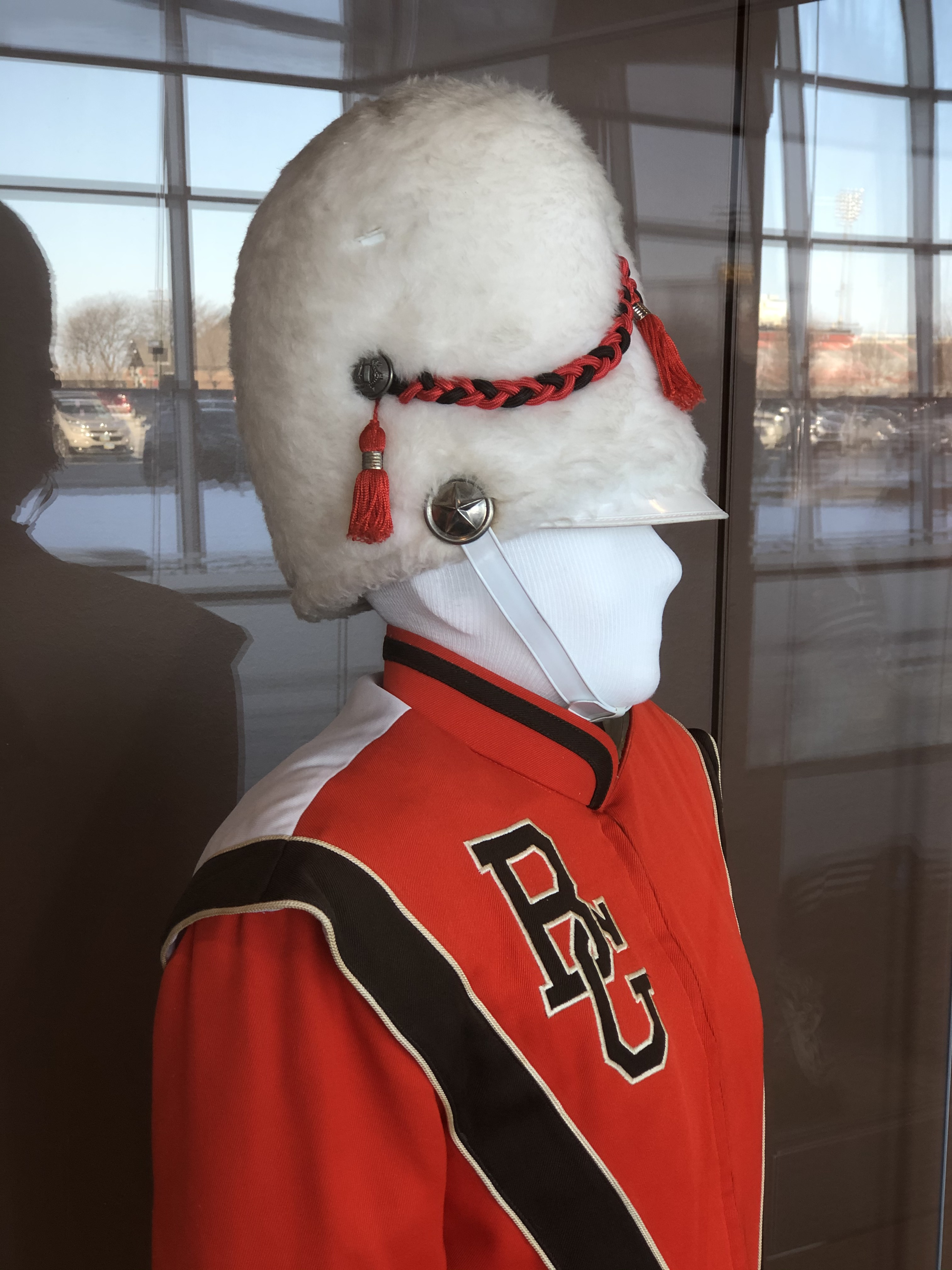
Uniform previously worn in the marching band

The first band to represent what would become Bowling Green State University was formed during the 1923–1924 academic year. Making its first appearance early during the football season, the band's premier performance that year was at the dedication of the new athletic field at homecoming.

=== Important dates ===
In the academic year of 2023–2024, the FMB celebrated its 100th anniversary at its homecoming game. Performances featured current members and alumni, bringing the band to over 700 members. These shows were directed by Jonathan Waters alongside former directors.

== Style and tradition ==
=== Concerts ===
A pre-game concert is offered one hour before every home football game. This concert has had many locations, including the Perry Field House, the Stroh Center, and outside the stadium. Currently, the FMB pre-game concert is held outside the stadium near the tailgate park and is called "Pre-Flight". The FMB hosts a "Sounds of the Stadium" concert at the end of the football season, which features show songs and standard school songs.

=== Marching style ===
The FMB marches in a high-powered chair step during parts of pre-game. However, during halftime the marching band marches in a traditional glide step (a heel to toe style march). This is due to the concentration necessary for the band's symphonic sound.

== Member composition ==
=== Band members ===
The band includes twirlers, color guards, and drum majors. The drum majors typically conduct and lead the band. Drum majors serve as secondary conductors when the band's official director is leading performances, or when special guests lead the band in performance.

=== Student staff ===
The band also has student staff. The staff has section leaders who are assigned to certain instruments and/or instrument parts. They assist in helping the band's directors during practices and performance planning. The staff also features a uniform, fiscal, secretarial, and other various forms of managers.

=== Pre-game show ===
The traditional pregame was recently changed for the centennial celebration of the school. The original pre-game is: FMB enters the field near the end of Doyt Perry Stadium executing chair step marching. After finishing the cadences that they enter the field to, the band then "collects" the members from a block formation to their unique "X" block style marching. They march down the field "8 to 5" with this "X" style to the fight song. After performing the fight song, they play "Go BG Warriors" (previously "Happy Days Are Here Again") and then play "Ay Ziggy Zoomba". They then begin to perform Bowling Green State University's Alma Mater. The Alma Mater is followed by a special arrangement of "America the Beautiful." Going into a patriotic melody, the marching band then does an advanced left-face which faces them toward the flag for the United States National Anthem directed by the college's Director of Bands (or visiting band director when present). They then do an about-face and exit the field to the traditional cadences.

The Falcon Marching Band is known for its signature pregame entrance. The entrance goes back to the late 1960s and was written and designed by Mark S. Kelly, director of bands at BGSU from 1966 to 1994. Small changes and modifications have been made to the entrance over the years to accommodate increases in membership, but the entrance has been relatively unchanged over the years. The traditional pregame entrance is similar to pregame entrances of Big Ten schools in that it uses fast cadences and makes use of the chair step. The traditional Bowling Green entrance uses various sequences and flashy visuals to bring the band on to the field for the downward march to the fight song.

The description of the pregame entrance is as follows: The tuba and percussion sections are in a block-like formation in the back of the end zone. The tuba section is lined up in two lines facing downfield. The rest of the band is lined up on the sidelines. With the blowing of the drum majors' whistles the band moves into attention. The drum major turns and faces the tuba and percussion sections. Together they bend back and shout out "Right up in there!" The crowd cheers knowing it is the start of pregame. At this moment the band does a sequence called "boom up". At the sound of a drum boom, the band on the sidelines bounces up back into attention. Then the drum major commands the percussion section to forward march. Using glide step and to the cheering of the crowd, the percussion section enters the field from the end zone while an introduction video plays. Once onto the field, using cymbal crashes on each letter, the band shouts out B-G-S-U. At this moment the cadence starts at about 168 beats per minute. Using a powered chair step, the tuba section high steps out of the end zone. On count 16 of the cadence, two things happen. As the tuba section enters the field, on count 16, the right and left sides of the tuba section flank out. The right side does a 270 spin on the flank while the left side just flanks left. As the flank happens, the tubas then move themselves into a downfield position. As they move into this position, each tuba on the left sides does a 270 spin and then moves into downfield position. Also, on the count of sixteen of the cadence, the rest of the band on the sidelines marks time using a power chair step and enters the field. As the band is entering the field from the sidelines, the drum majors, kicking up their legs, move quickly from the endzone to the front of the band. When the cadence ends, the band does a halt and twists toward the homeside. After the twist, the band plays the "Falcon Fanfare" and then marches down the field to "Forward Falcons", the university fight song, using a chair step.

=== Post-game show ===
After every football game, the band, football players, and fans collect at the band's stand to sing/play the Alma Mater. If a win, the band will play "Beer Barrel Polka." Every major athletic event ends with a playing of "Ay Ziggy Zoomba", and "Forward Falcons". During "Beer Barrel Polka", the tubas do a march through the end zone before the band exits playing their traditional cadences.

=== Symphonic sound ===
The Falcon Marching Band is a traditional United States style marching band. Instrumentation features trumpets, trombones, sousaphones, mellophones, euphoniums, saxophones (alto and tenor), clarinets, flutes, piccolos, and percussion made up of snare drums, tenor drums, bass drums and cymbals. The FMB does not have a front ensemble, or pit. The reasoning for not limiting instruments to a certain set, is the band's tradition of always projecting a unique symphonic sound using a variety of instruments and composition techniques. The goal is to feature a sound not usually found among most high school and collegiate marching bands.

== Original compositions ==
=== Commissioned music ===
The band, in its history, has had original music commissioned and then performed. In 2003, the band commissioned music by Ryan Nowlin (BGSU Classes of 2000 and 2004) titled Frontiers. The band premiered this show on November 28, 2003. In 2007, the band again commissioned a work from Ryan Nowlin titled New Frontiers. The music composed by Ryan Nowlin, with percussion by Michael Sander, and visual design from Jason Sivill, had themes from the original Frontiers. This band premiered the show on November 2, 2007. They have commissioned a new chorale from the New Frontiers composition. In 2004, Ryan Nowlin, to honor them for their work and performance, he wrote a piece titled Chorale for Dr. Carol Hayward and the Falcon Marching Band. This piece featured themes from Frontiers. The band still uses this now traditional piece as a warm-up and for public performances.

=== School songs ===
The BGSU FMB has three common songs that can be heard at various athletic and academic events. These three song "standards" for the college include; the Alma Mater, "Forward Falcons", and "Ay Ziggy Zomba" which is played to hype the crowd at events, which is quite possibly the most recognizable song for the students, alumni, and fans.

==== Forward Falcons (fight song) ====
Forward Falcons,
Forward Falcons,
Fight for victory.

Show our spirit,
make them fear it,
Fight for ol' Bee Gee.

Forward Falcons,
Forward Falcons,
Make the contest keen.

Hold up the fame
of our mighty name,
and win for Bowling Green!

==== Ay Ziggy Zoomba ====
Ay Ziggy Zoomba Zoomba Zoomba
Ay Ziggy Zoomba Zoomba Ze

Ay Ziggy Zoomba Zoomba Zoomba
Ay Ziggy Zoomba Zoomba Ze

Roll along you BG warriors
Roll along and fight for BGSU!

== Audition process ==
Auditions are held during the beginning of August rehearsals. The students that have already been accepted into the university move into their assigned residence halls prior to the normal move-in date for other students. Prospective members participate in Fundamentals Week - a form of band camp more commonly known to the veteran members as "Fundies Week", during which they work on marching fundamentals, drills and music rehearsals seven days prior to the opening of classes at the university.

== Notable performances ==
=== Football ===
The FMB travels extensively in support of BGSU Athletics and has performed in a variety of festivals and parades. Away trips for the Falcon Marching Band have included: the University of Akron, University of Michigan, Pennsylvania State University, University of Toledo, Eastern Michigan, Miami, West Virginia, Marshall, Ohio State, Ball State, as well as professional football games at Riverfront Stadium & Paul Brown Stadium in Cincinnati, Ohio, the Pontiac Silverdome, and Cleveland Browns Stadium, and many high school band festivals.

Additional trips have included appearances in bowl games such as the California Raisin Bowl in Fresno, CA, the Silver Bowl in Las Vegas, the Motor City Bowl in Detroit, the GMAC Bowl in Mobile, AL, the Humanitarian Bowl in Boise, ID, the Military Bowl in Washington D.C., the Little Caesars Pizza Bowl in Detroit, and in 2014, the FMB traveled to Montgomery, Alabama to assist the football team in the first ever "Camellia Bowl". The game ended in a 33-28 BGSU win against the University of South Alabama Jaguars.

=== Festival ===
The band has also been featured in the Macy's Thanksgiving Day Parade. In 2007, they were invited to perform in exhibition at the Bands of America Regional in Indianapolis, and then again in 2017 for the Grand Finals at Lucas Oil Stadium. In 2015, the FMB performed in the first ever Bands of America Regional Finals at Doyt Perry Stadium on the campus of BGSU. In 2025, they participated at the St Patrick’s Day parade in Dublin, Ireland. They have been selected to perform in the Tournament of Roses Parade on January 1, 2027. They will join a list of only a select group of collegiate bands to perform in the parade without their prospective football team in the Rose Bowl.
