= Love Letters (song) =

1945 song by Edward Heyman and Victor Young

"Love Letters" is a 1945 popular song with lyrics by Edward Heyman and music by Victor Young. The song appeared, without lyrics, in the film of the same name released in October 1945. A vocal version by Dick Haymes, arranged and conducted by Young, was recorded in March 1945 and peaked in popularity in September. "Love Letters" was subsequently nominated for the Academy Award for Best Original Song in 1945, but lost to "It Might as Well Be Spring" from State Fair.

The song has been covered by a number of artists, most notably by Nat King Cole (1957), Ketty Lester (1962), Elvis Presley (1966), and Alison Moyet (1987).

== Ketty Lester version ==
"Love Letters"

Single by Ketty Lester

from the album Love Letters
- B-side: "I'm a Fool to Want You"
- Released: 1962
- Recorded: 1962
- Length: 2:27
- Label: Era, London
- Composer: Victor Young
- Lyricist: Edward Heyman

Ketty Lester singles chronology
"Queen for a Day" (1962)	"Love Letters" (1962)	"But Not for Me" (1962)

In 1962, Era Records released Ketty Lester's version of "Love Letters" as a single, backed by her version of "I'm a Fool to Want You". Lester's recording of "Love Letters", which featured Lincoln Mayorga's sparse piano and organ arrangement and Earl Palmer on drums, reached No. 5 on the Billboard Hot 100 in early 1962. The single also reached No. 2 on the R&B chart and No. 4 on the UK Singles Chart, selling over 1 million copies, and was awarded a gold disc by the RIAA. In 1991, it was ranked 176th on the RIAA's list of the Songs of the Century.

Lester's version appeared in David Lynch's 1986 film Blue Velvet, playing during a police raid on Frank Booth (Dennis Hopper)'s apartment, and on its accompanying soundtrack album.

=== Charts ===
Chart (1962)	Peak position
Australia Kent Music Report	10
Ireland IRMA	8
New Zealand RIANZ	6
UK Singles Chart	4
U.S. Billboard Hot 100	5
U.S. Billboard Hot R&B	2

== Elvis Presley versions ==
"Love Letters"

Single by Elvis Presley

from the album Elvis' Gold Records Volume 4
- A-side: "Come What May"
- Released: June 8, 1966
- Recorded: May 26, 1966
- Studio: RCA Studio B, Nashville
- Length: 2:48
- Label: RCA
- Composer: Victor Young
- Lyricist: Edward Heyman

Elvis Presley singles chronology
"Frankie and Johnny" (1966)	"Come What May" / "Love Letters" (1966)	"Spinout" (1966)

Elvis Presley recorded a version of "Love Letters" on May 26, 1966. Just over a week later, on June 8, 1966, RCA released the song as a single, with "Come What May" as the B-side. "Love Letters" peaked at No. 19 on the Billboard Hot 100 on July 22, 1966, staying on the chart for only seven weeks. Musicians on this recording included Scotty Moore and Chip Young on guitar, Floyd Cramer on piano, David Briggs on organ, Bob Moore on bass, D. J. Fontana on drums, Buddy Harman on percussion, Boots Randolph and Rufus Long on saxophone, and Pete Drake on pedal steel guitar, with background vocals by the Jordanaires and the Imperials. Presley re-recorded the song in 1970; this later version appears on the 1971 album Love Letters from Elvis.

=== Charts ===
Chart (1966)	Peak position
Belgium (Ultratop 50 Flanders)	20
Belgium (Ultratop 50 Wallonia)	49
Canada Top Singles (RPM)	29
Ireland (IRMA)	7
New Zealand (Listener)	7
UK Singles (Official Charts)	6
US Billboard Hot 100	19
US Adult Contemporary (Billboard)	38

== Alison Moyet version ==
"Love Letters"

Single by Alison Moyet
- B-side: "This House"
- Released: November 1987
- Length: 2:50
- Label: CBS
- Composer: Victor Young
- Lyricist: Edward Heyman
- Producers: Alison Moyet; Steve Brown

Alison Moyet singles chronology
"Sleep Like Breathing" (1987)	"Love Letters" (1987)	"It Won't Be Long" (1991)

In 1987, Alison Moyet released her own version of the song as a non-album single. It reached No. 4 in the UK and remained in the charts for twelve weeks. A music video was filmed to promote the single and featured Dawn French and Jennifer Saunders.

Speaking to The Quietus in 2013, Moyet revealed she recorded "Love Letters" as she knew it would be a hit: "'Love Letters' and 'Weak in the Presence of Beauty' – neither song I enjoy now – they're both my fault. I found them. That was when I was feeling smart, thinking that I knew what a hit was." She also told the BBC in 2004: "After my versions of 'Love Letters' and 'That Ole Devil Called Love' did well, there was definite pressure for me to become some sort of jazz diva."

Upon release, Music & Media described Moyet's version as "moody" and "sparsely-backed". Zodiac Mindwarp, as guest reviewer for Smash Hits, felt the song was "very well done" but reminiscent of Simply Red. Carole Linfield of Record Mirror criticised Moyet's rendition as "dreary" and a "slow and dopey cover".

=== Charts ===
Chart (1987)	Peak position
Belgian Singles Chart (V)	24
Dutch Singles Chart	40
Ireland IRMA	6
New Zealand RIANZ	39
South African Charts	11
UK Singles Chart	4

== Other versions ==
- Dick Haymes (in 1945, US No. 11)
- Joe Walsh on his album You Bought It – You Name It (1983)
- Etta James on her album Blue Gardenia (2001).
