= Ankle knee step =

Marching style

The ankle knee step is a type of high step used by marching bands. It is named such because when executed properly, the ankle of one leg should be at the height of the knee of the other leg. This step is chiefly used by marching bands which consider themselves traditional or show style bands, although drum corps and corps-style marching bands may use this step sparingly for effect.

When performed, the toe should be the last part of the foot to leave the ground and the first part to hit it again. Although the step is a dynamic movement, care should be taken to step smoothly so as not to interrupt the air flow of wind instrumentalists. As the glide step rolls the foot from the heel to the toe, marchers executing the ankle knee step roll the foot from the toe to the heel.

The entire step is a fluid motion; execution should be in time such that the "up" position is reached on the "and" counts and the "down" position is on the "down" counts. The foot comes forward in a scooping action rather than a bicycle step, which is to be avoided.

== University bands that use the ankle knee step ==
- Marching 100 (Florida A&M University)
- The Pride (Bethune-Cookman University)
- The Human Jukebox (Southern University)
- Tiger Marching Band (Grambling State University)
- The Aristocrat of Bands (Tennessee State University)
- Marching Illini (University of Illinois)
- The Pride of The Peninsula (Eastern Michigan University)
- South Carolina State Marching 101 Band (South Carolina State University)

== See also ==
- Glide step
- Chair step
