= Down in the Alley =

1957 single by The Clovers

Single by The Clovers

from the album Dance Party
- A-side: "Down in the Alley"; "There's No Tomorrow"
- Released: 1957
- Recorded: 1957
- Genre: R&B
- Length: 2:18
- Label: Atlantic
- Songwriter: Jesse Stone

The Clovers singles chronology
| "I I I Love You" (1957) | "Down in the Alley" / "There's No Tomorrow'" (1957) | "Wishing For Your Love" (1958) |

"Down in the Alley"

Song by Elvis Presley

from the album Spinout
- Released: 1966
- Recorded: 1966
- Genre: Rock and roll
- Length: 2:48
- Label: RCA
- Songwriter: Jesse Stone and the Clovers

"Down in the Alley" is a song released as a single by The Clovers in 1957.

Elvis Presley recorded it in 1966. His version was included as a bonus track on his 1966 soundtrack album Spinout.

== Writing ==
The song is credited to Jesse Stone and the Clovers. The version recorded by Ronnie Hawkins is credited to S. (Solomon) Burke, B.(Burt) Berns, B. Marvin (Babe Chivian), C. (Joseph) Martin.

== Recordings and releases ==
=== Elvis Presley version ===
Presley recorded it between 4 and 7 AM in the early morning of May 26, 1966 at the May 25—28 studio sessions for RCA at the RCA Studio B in Nashville, Tennessee.

With Bob Dylan cover "Tomorrow Is a Long Time" from the same session, "Down in the Alley" was included as a bonus track on the Spinout soundtrack album.

== Track listing ==
=== The Clovers version ===
7" single (1957)

1. Down in the Alley (Clovers, Jesse Stone) — 2:18
2. There's No Tomorrow (Hoffman, Corday, Carr) — 2:45
