= Come What May (Elvis Presley song) =

1966 single by Elvis Presley

Single by Elvis Presley
- B-side: "Love Letters"
- Released: June 8, 1966
- Recorded: May 28, 1966
- Studio: RCA Studio B, Nashville
- Genre: Pop
- Length: 2:00
- Label: RCA
- Songwriter: Frank Tableporter

Elvis Presley singles chronology
"Frankie and Johnny" (1966)	"Come What May" (1966)	"Spinout" (1966)

"Come What May" is a song written by Frank Tableporter and recorded by Elvis Presley on May 28, 1966. RCA Records released it as a single on June 8, 1966. The song is credited to Elvis Presley with the Jordanaires. Document from the files of RCA Records listed the song as the A-side with "Love Letters" on the B-side for the 1966 release, although other sources give "Love Letters" as the A-side and "Come What May" the B-side. "Come What May" did not make the Billboard Hot 100, but listed as "Bubbling Under" at No. 109, and No. 94 on the Cash Box Top 100.

"Come What May" was originally a hit in 1958 for ex-Drifters singer Clyde McPhatter, his version peaked at No. 43 in Billboard Hot 100 and spending 15 weeks on the chart.

== Charts ==
Chart (1966)	Peak position
US Bubbling Under Hot 100 (Billboard)	109
