= Moonwalk (dance) =

Dance figure popularised by Michael Jackson

The moonwalk (backslide)

The moonwalk, or backslide, is a popping dance move in which the performer glides backwards but their body actions suggest forward motion. It became popular around the world when American singer Michael Jackson performed the move during the performance of "Billie Jean" on Motown 25: Yesterday, Today, Forever, which was broadcast in 1983; he later incorporated it in tours and live performances. Jackson has been credited as renaming the "backslide" as the moonwalk and it became his signature move. The moonwalk existed for decades before it had that name: Cab Calloway called it "the buzz"; California's black dancers called it the backslide; tap dancers, a skate; and the French mime artist Marcel Marceau called it "walking against the wind."

== History ==
=== Early use ===
Holman (2004) identified early evidence for the moonwalk in a statement made by Arthur Marshall, who was an African American composer of ragtime music. Marshall stated, "If a guy could really do it, he sometimes looked as if he was being towed around on ice skates. The performer moves forward without appearing to move his feet at all by manipulating his toes and heels rapidly."

Holman also states: "A dance that appeared around the turn of the century in Black minstrel shows called Stepping on the Puppy's Tail also had an amazing resemblance to the moon walk. Stepping on the Puppy's Tail was described as moving each foot alternately backwards 'like a horse pawing the ground.'"

==== 1920s ====
The African American vaudeville performer and mime artist Johnny Hudgins crafted a distinctive routine that blended eccentric dance with pantomime and what was then called "freak" movement, incorporating a moonwalk-like step along with a slow-motion spin, an early instance of the dance moves that would later evolve into Michael Jackson's signature moonwalk.

==== 1930s ====
There are many recorded instances of the moonwalk; similar steps are reported as far back as 1932, used by Cab Calloway and Charlie Chaplin. In 1985, Calloway said that the move was called "The Buzz" when he and others performed it in the 1930s.

The 1935 animated short film Dancing on the Moon, directed by Dave Fleischer and part of the Color Classics series of animated short films, contains a segment where the protagonist cat dances the moonwalk.

==== 1950s ====
In 1958, on the Pat Boone Show, Dick Van Dyke performed a similar variation of the moonwalk and camel walk in his comedy routine called "Mailing a Letter on a Windy Corner".

In 1955, it was recorded in a performance by tap dancer Bill Bailey. He performs a tap routine, and at the end, backslides into the wings. The French mime artist Marcel Marceau used it throughout his career (from the 1940s through the 1980s), as part of the drama of his mime routines. In Marceau's "Walking Against the Wind" routine, he pretends to be pushed backwards by a gust of wind.

In 1958, Mexican dancer-comedian Adalberto Martinez (a.k.a. "Resortes") also performed the moonwalk in the film Colegio de Verano ("Summer School").

==== 1960s ====
In a November 1969 episode of H.R. Pufnstuf, Judy the Frog teaches everyone a new dance called "The Moonwalk", which includes two instances of a stationary moonwalk.

==== 1970s ====
In the late 1970s, the long-running African-American TV dance show Soul Train featured a dance troupe called "The Electric Boogaloos" which routinely performed popping and locking dance moves including the moonwalk.

In Stanley Donen's 1974 film version of The Little Prince, actor/choreographer Bob Fosse incorporated a dance move resembling the moonwalk into the musical number "Snake in the Grass".

It has also been acknowledged that professional wrestlers Michael "Purely Sexy" Hayes, Terry Gordy, and Buddy Roberts started doing the moonwalk as their trademark ring entrance by 1979 when they formed a wrestling stable known as The Fabulous Freebirds.

=== 1980s ===
James Brown, an influence on Michael Jackson, had previously used a "camel walk" move.

In 1980, in the music video for their single "One Step Ahead" by New Zealand rock band Split Enz, keyboardist Eddie Rayner is seen performing a predecessor of the moonwalk, and Nigel Griggs (former bassist for Split Enz) allegedly taught him how to perform it.

The 1981 music video for "Crosseyed and Painless" by new wave band Talking Heads features authentic street dancers, including Stephen "Skeeter Rabbit" Nichols, doing the moonwalk.

Another early moonwalker was popper and singer Jeffrey Daniel, who moonwalked in a performance of Shalamar's "A Night to Remember" on Top of the Pops in the UK in 1982 and was known to perform backslides in public performances (including weekly Soul Train episodes) as far back as 1974. Michael Jackson was a fan of Jeffrey Daniel's dancing and would eventually seek him out.

==== Michael Jackson and the moonwalk ====
Michael Jackson demonstrating the moonwalk on the 1983 television special Motown 25: Yesterday, Today, Forever, which helped popularize the move

Singer Bobby Brown of New Edition was one of the "three kids" Jackson said taught him the dance step in his autobiography, Moonwalk. It had been rumored that Jeffrey Daniel taught Jackson the moonwalk; however, Daniel was touring with Shalamar at the time, so Jackson reached out to Soul Train dancer/employee Cheryl Song to arrange a meeting with dancer Geron "Caszper" Canidate. At this point, Ron Wiesner Jackson's management contacted Caszper to arrange private dance lessons for Jackson in June 1981. Caszper, who claims to have a copy of the check and original contract, spent one week privately instructing Jackson how to perform the moonwalk. Jackson first danced in public on March 25, 1983, during the television special, Motown 25: Yesterday, Today, Forever, in front of a live audience at the Pasadena Civic Auditorium. The dance became world-famous two months later when the show premiered on television. Dressed in his signature black trousers, silver socks, black-sequined jacket, and rhinestoned glove, Jackson spun around, posed, and began moonwalking. Music critic Ian Inglis later wrote that Jackson encapsulated a long tradition of African-American dance movements in that one performance. Moonwalking received widespread attention, and from then on, the moonwalk became Jackson's signature move for his song "Billie Jean". Nelson George said that Jackson's rendition "combined Jackie Wilson's athleticism with James Brown's camel walk". Following the Motown 25 special, Jackson contacted Daniel to master the technique further once Daniel returned from tour.

Jackson's autobiography was titled Moonwalk, and he also starred in a 1988 film titled Moonwalker.

==== Mid-1980s ====
In Flashdance (1983), the move was used in the B-boy scene, where Rock Steady Crew's Mr. Freeze (Marc Lemberger), with an umbrella prop, mimed the wind blowing him backward as he first walks forward, fighting the wind, then starts moonwalking backwards. Mr. Freeze's version was also shown in the first hip hop movie Wild Style and Malcolm McLaren film clip "Buffalo Gals".

In the 1984 movie Streets of Fire, actor and performer Stoney Jackson executed a moonwalk as the leader of a fictional group, The Sorels, who lip-synced to the Dan Hartman song "I Can Dream About You". The movie was filmed in the northern spring of 1983, also predating the iconic Michael Jackson moonwalk.

Donnie Yen performs a moonwalk in the 1984 Hong Kong film Drunken Tai Chi.

=== 2000s ===
Alexei Kovalev has been known for using the moonwalk in his National Hockey League career. He performed the move after scoring a goal on February 7, 2001, and on January 3, 2010. Kovalev moonwalked onto the ice after being named one of the stars of the game and again after scoring in a 2008 celebrity charity soccer game.
