= Iowa State University Cyclone Marching Band =

College marching band in Ames, Iowa

Iowa State University Cyclone Football 'Varsity' Marching Band
- Nickname: The Pride of Iowa State
- School: Iowa State University
- Location: Ames, Iowa
- Conference: Big 12 Conference
- Founded: 1881 (144 years ago)
- Director: Christian Blake Carichner
- Members: 365

The Iowa State University Cyclone Marching Band is the marching band of Iowa State University. Composed of two ensembles, the Iowa State University Cyclone Football 'Varsity' Marching Band (ISUCF'V'MB) and State Storm, the band performs in support of the Iowa State Cyclones football team at all home games (at the Jack Trice Stadium) and at some away games versus Big 12 Conference rivals. Nicknamed the "Pride of Iowa State", the "Best of the Midwest", and the "Varsity Band," the band plays at high school band festivals, indoor concerts, and post-season bowl games.

Pep bands drawn from the membership of the ISUCF'V'MB perform for home volleyball and basketball games at Hilton Coliseum as well as the Big 12 tournament, National Invitation Tournament, and NCAA tournament. The band makes appearances at pep rallies, special occasions, and formerly in the annual spring VEISHEA celebration parade.

In addition to augmenting the Varsity Band at home football games, State Storm is the official athletic band for home soccer, wrestling, and gymnastics.

== History ==
The first evidence of a marching band at Iowa State can be found in a newspaper article mentioning the reorganization of the band in 1881. In 1886, a drum major first performed alongside the band for a halftime show. The band competed in a band contest held in connection with the Drake Relays in Des Moines, Iowa in 1928 and made its first appearance at an away football game in 1936. The band appeared in Pigskin Pageants, a college-produced documentary movie, in 1947.

The band on the front steps of Iowa State's Beardshear Hall in 1909

Women were first allowed to march in the band in a limited capacity, as majorettes and percussionists, during World War II. Alvin Edgar first instituted "floating" marching formations in the 1940s, which have become a standard of the band's halftime and pregame performances. Basketball pep bands first made their appearance at Iowa State in 1951, and in 1953, the school hosted its first "Band Day". That same year, Mason City, Iowa native Meredith Willson, composer of The Music Man, composed "For I, For S", first played at the annual football game against the Kansas State Wildcats. The Cyclones and the marching band made their first appearance at a bowl game at the 1971 Sun Bowl in El Paso, Texas, and appeared the next year at the 1972 Liberty Bowl in Memphis, Tennessee. As a part of a national movement by college bands to open their ranks to female members, women joined the band in 1972.

In 1973, composer Jerry Bilik arranged a new version of the pregame "ISU Fanfare". The band performed along with Maynard Ferguson in front of President Gerald Ford during a halftime show in 1976. The band added a 'V' to its acronym in 1979 when members were using the varsity football team's showers after a game in preparation for a trip to perform for the Kansas City Chiefs. When confronted by head football coach Earl Bruce, a bass drum player responded that they were the "Varsity Band". The Alumni Band, a collection of former band members, made its first annual appearance at the 1980 Homecoming, the same year the marching band began to perform at the annual Band Extravaganza with other Iowa State band ensembles. The ISUCF'V'MB was the first college band to play the new Pepsi jingle composed by Ray Charles. In 1995 the band recorded the theme song to the ABC sitcom Coach and appeared in the introductory sequence. They performed in London for the millennium New Year's Eve.

Student musician interest in marching band has consistently exceeded the marching band's capacity. With as many as 600 students auditioning for the approximately 365 marching band spots, membership in the band is highly competitive. For the 2015 season, the band was expanded to include an additional 60-member marching ensemble, "State Storm." In addition to playing alongside the Varsity Band during football games at Jack Trice Stadium, State Storm is the athletic pep band for Iowa State University soccer, wrestling, and gymnastics.

=== Recent developments ===
==== Previous Appearances ====
As success returned to the Cyclone football squad, the band accompanied the team to five bowl games in six years (including twice to the Independence Bowl in Shreveport, Louisiana. Pep bands made appearances at the 2000 men's Elite Eight and 2004 National Invitational Tournament semifinals in New York. Over 300 alumni and five former ISUCF'V'MB directors (including Roger Cichy) joined the band on the field at Homecoming 2005 for a performance of Tchaikovsky's "1812 Overture", complete with artillery from the Iowa Army National Guard. The 2007 ISUCF'V'MB made its first appearance at an away conference football game in a decade against the Kansas Jayhawks in Lawrence, Kansas. The band biannually travels to the rivalry game against the Iowa Hawkeyes at Kinnick Stadium in Iowa City.

==== Recent Bowl Games ====
The ISUCF'V'MB has made recent appearances at 4 bowl games. In 2017 they accompanied the football team on a trip to the Liberty Bowl, in Memphis, Tennessee for a cyclone victory. The next year, they marched in the Alamo Stadium in San Antonio, Texas. In 2019, the band accompanied the football team to Camping World Stadium for the Camping World Bowl in Orlando, Florida. In 2021, they returned to Orlando for the Cheez-It Bowl. The band will continue to accompany the football team on any future trips to the Big 12 Championship Game, College Football Playoff, or any other times when the Cyclones appear at an NCAA Bowl Game.

==== New Uniforms ====
In the beginning of the 2019 NCAA regular season, the Varsity Marching Band debuted their brand new uniforms. Notable changes to these new uniforms include a collar with the letters "ISUCF V MB" embroidered onto them; a modern, half-cardinal and half-white-to-gold design, shakos with an embroidered cardinal logo, longer plumes with gold trim, custom gauntlets, and most notably, a cape spelling "CYCLONES" on the back of the right shoulder.

== Band organization ==
=== Auxiliary ===
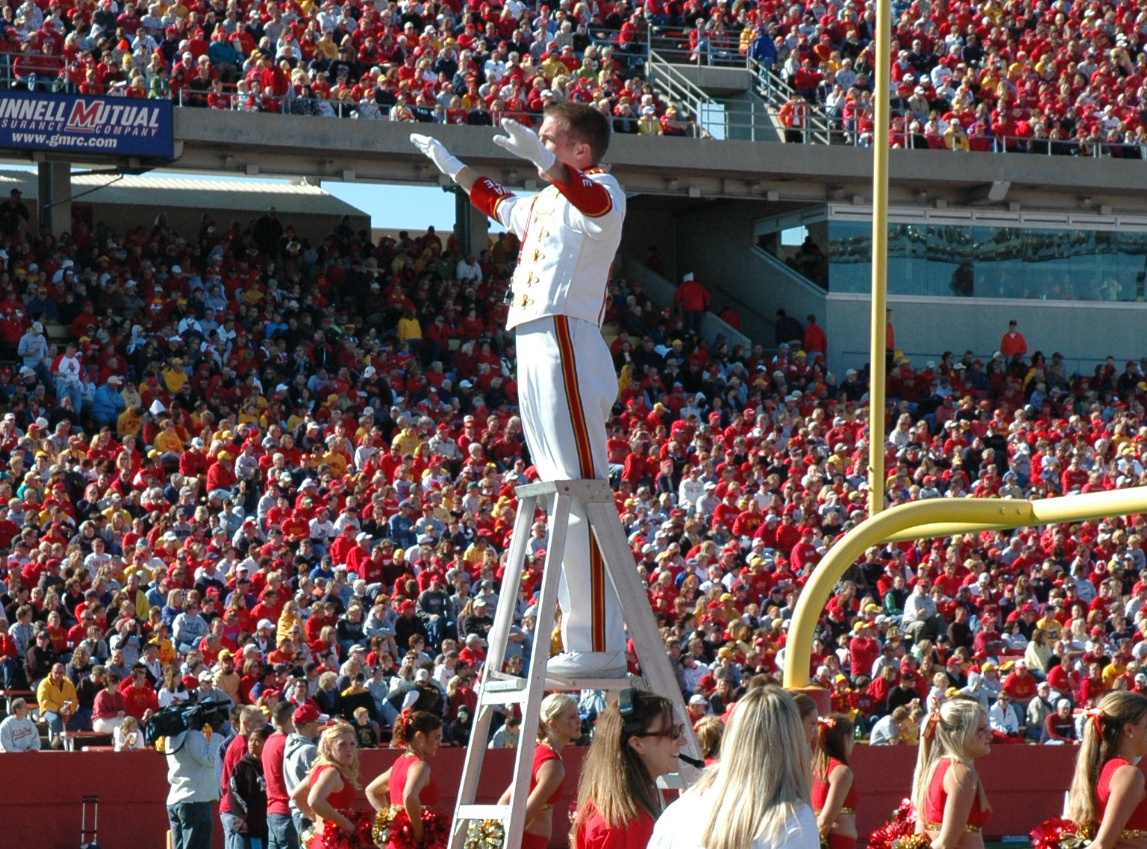
A drum major on a ladder conducts the band between plays at a Jack Trice Stadium home game

- 6 Student staff
- 1 to 3 Featured Baton twirlers
- 3 Drum Majors
- 30 Color guard

=== Brass ===
- 36 Trombones
- 9 Bass Trombones
- 18 Baritones
- 54 Trumpets
- 27 Mellophones
- 36 Sousaphones

=== Drumline ===
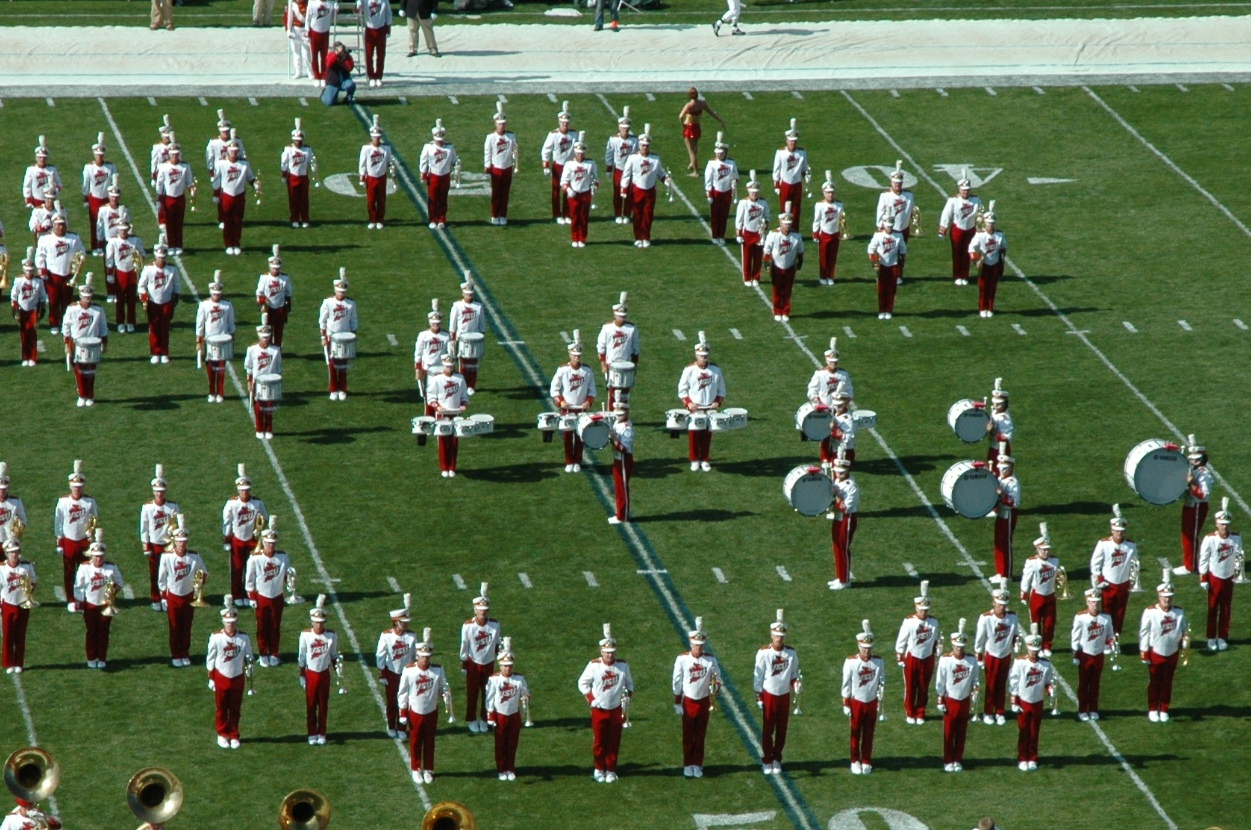
The drumline and brass instrumentalists forming the "S" for State during a pregame show

- 8 to 10 snare drums
- 7 bass drums
- 4 to 6 tenor drums
- 8 to 10 cymbals

=== Woodwinds ===
- 23 alto saxophones
- 18 tenor saxophones
- 27 clarinets
- 18 piccolos

== Auditions ==
Students seeking to join the ISUCF'V'MB on a wind instrument audition during the first two days of band camp. The audition consists of the fight song (played memorized), a prepared etude, and a marching evaluation. During the first day of band camp (rookie camp), the prospective members are taught basic marching techniques used within the ISUCF'V'MB. The marching portion of the audition is an evaluation of these learned techniques. Twirler, flag, and drumline auditions are held at different times during the summer. Flag auditions take place in the spring, and the drumline auditions take place on the Saturday before the whole band reports to camp in August. Candidates for the twirler positions perform a routine of songs of performance caliber showcasing their skills in front of the director, followed by an interview.

== Rehearsals ==
Rehearsals for the ISUCF'V'MB begin the week before fall classes, with Band Camp. Band members move into their residencies early and then report to a five- to seven-day camp that serves as an introduction for new members and stresses marching fundamentals and group unity. It is also an opportunity to begin learning pregame and halftime music and shows. The band practices on a field west of the Communications Building. After this period, they enter a regular practice schedule consisting of a one hour and thirty minute rehearsal every regular school day. Other longer rehearsals may be scheduled on holidays.

Rehearsals consist of musical and marching warm-ups, sectional rehearsals of difficult pieces of music, periodic reviews of the pregame routine, learning new formations, and the execution of halftime shows. The ISUCF'V'MB learns around six shows a year that include a wide variety of music and marching styles. Students in the ISUCF'V'MB are required to register for a music class in the fall semester, and receive a letter grade based on their attendance and punctuality to rehearsals and games.

== Directors ==
The marching band was originally under the instruction of the director of bands at Iowa State, but since 1972 has been under the direction of the Associate Director of bands and the Assistant Director of bands. The directors are responsible for organizing the band, auditioning new members, selecting and leading the student staff and leadership, making travel arrangements, writing or commissioning marching drill, selecting music, running rehearsals, directing the basketball pep bands, and communicating with the Athletic Director and university. The current director of the ISUCF'V'MB is Christian Carichner. The current director of State Storm is Javan Shields.

=== Student staff ===
Six student staff members are annually selected through an application/interview process from the current membership of the ISUCF'V'MB. These students are usually senior members with past experience in administration and have marching band experience. They assist the directors with band logistics and help the band's librarians with the copying and distribution of music. Staff members assist the directors and drum majors during practices in improving marching technique and discipline. Staff members with conducting experience help the drum majors lead the band to provide better coverage on the field or in the stands.

=== Drum Majors ===
Drum major candidates audition at the conclusion of each season for the position for the next season. Their audition includes aspects of field marching, conducting, and leadership in front of the directors and the entire band. The main responsibility of an ISUCF'V'MB drum major is as a field commander who conducts and calls songs during rehearsals, games, and special performances, though they have other roles as instructors and leaders. They teach fundamental marching and playing techniques during Band Camp, and themselves briefly march on the field at the beginning of every pregame show.

=== Captains ===
Each instrument's section has a designated captain who is responsible for the musical output of the section. The captains are selected by application, and are generally very senior members or have special expertise in music (they are commonly music majors). Captains rehearse their sections during special sectional practices during normal rehearsals, special practices organized by the captain themselves, and occasionally coordinate the section's group travel plans and unofficial and traditional activities.

=== Guides ===
The wind instruments are divided into 28 ranks (designated A through Z with the additional "super-A" as @, and DD (Double-D) rank for Bass Trombones), each with two guides. Flags have their own system of guides, and the drum line has a single guide for each instrument. Guides are selected from a section's membership based on experience and teaching ability. Guides serve as leaders for each rank and are charged with perfecting their marching performance.

=== Star Rank system ===
Every rank marches pregame with eight members at a time (designated by the Arabic numerals '1' through '8'), though there are usually nine members per rank. Therefore, one member of each rank (typically a first year marcher) marches in the back of the field in "Star Rank". There is also a much smaller Star Rank for each halftime show. This system replaces the alternate system by providing replacement players while guaranteeing every member a spot to march on the field.

== Marching style ==
The ISUCF'V'MB utilizes a unique and traditional marching style during its pregame presentations. The Big Ten-style high-step march (used only for the "form-float-flip" portion of the pregame at Big Ten games including the annual Iowa-Iowa State rivalry) incorporates a high leg/knee motion combined with a downward toe point. In addition, a similar half-height, double-time version of the high-step, called 'X'ing, is used to enter the field for pregame performances. The swing cadence, which the band uses to march into the tunnel at the end of their performance, is also an ISUCF'V'MB signature; members move in a half-time while jumping from one foot to the other to cadence in a motion that is similar to hopping. For halftime performances the band uses DCI-style"glide step", which allows it to maximize its musical and marching output. This is the step the band uses during parades.

== Gameday ==
=== Warm-Up ===
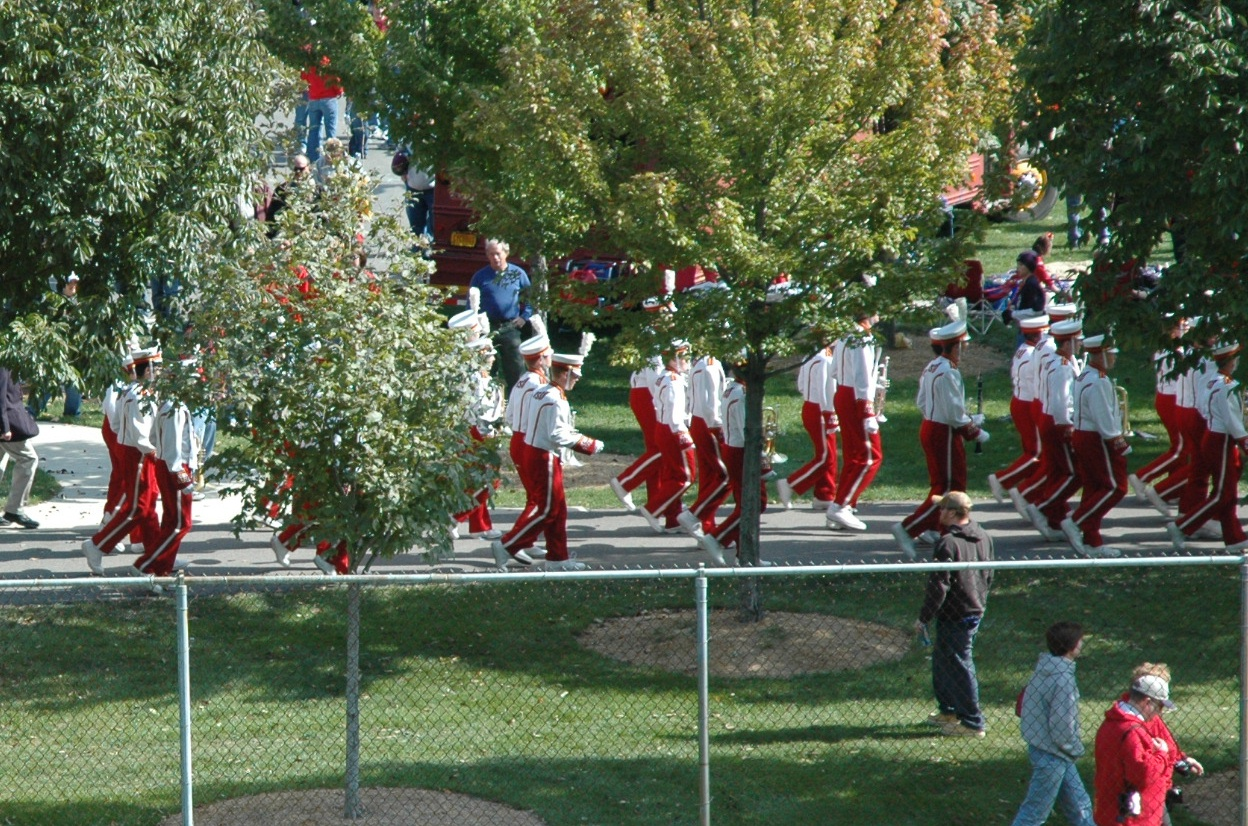
The band on parade under the trees surrounding Jack Trice Stadium before a game

The band holds a final rehearsal the morning of a Saturday game day. The band stretches in a parade block and warms up in sections to fix any last musical issues before performance.

In past years, the band participated in the Spirit Walk, wherein the band formed a tunnel into the stadium from the main thoroughfare and played various school songs as the football team entered. From here, the band moved approximately two hours before kickoff into the courtyard of the Iowa State Center near the Scheman Building. Here the students would stretch and warm up on their musical instrument. Guides would sometime give special performances before assembly for early-arriving Cyclone fans, and the whole band would perform a few songs and a sample of the halftime shows for the gathered audience. The band would then break by ranks to form a block and parade under cadences to the south side of Jack Trice Stadium for pregame.

Recently, the band has maintained the Spirit Walk tradition, now held in front of Jack Trice Stadium; however, there have also been approximately five sub-groups made up of a few of every instrument forming "Tailgating Bands" that will roam the parking lots, playing school songs for the fans out tailgating. After the Spirit Walk is complete, the band will move to the Alumni Center's eastern staircase and perform a collection of school songs, halftime selections, and other cheers, in what is called a "Step Show". Once complete, the band still dismisses by rank to form the parade block, and then marches around the parking lots and back into Jack Trice Stadium.

Beginning in 2015, the State Storm ensemble parades through the parking lots of Jack Trice Stadium and the RV Village, separately from the Varsity Band, also entertaining fans with selections from the halftime show, school songs, and cheer favorites. A favorite Storm activity is circling around a row of portable toilets, waiting to serenade the next fan who exits a stall.

=== Pregame ===
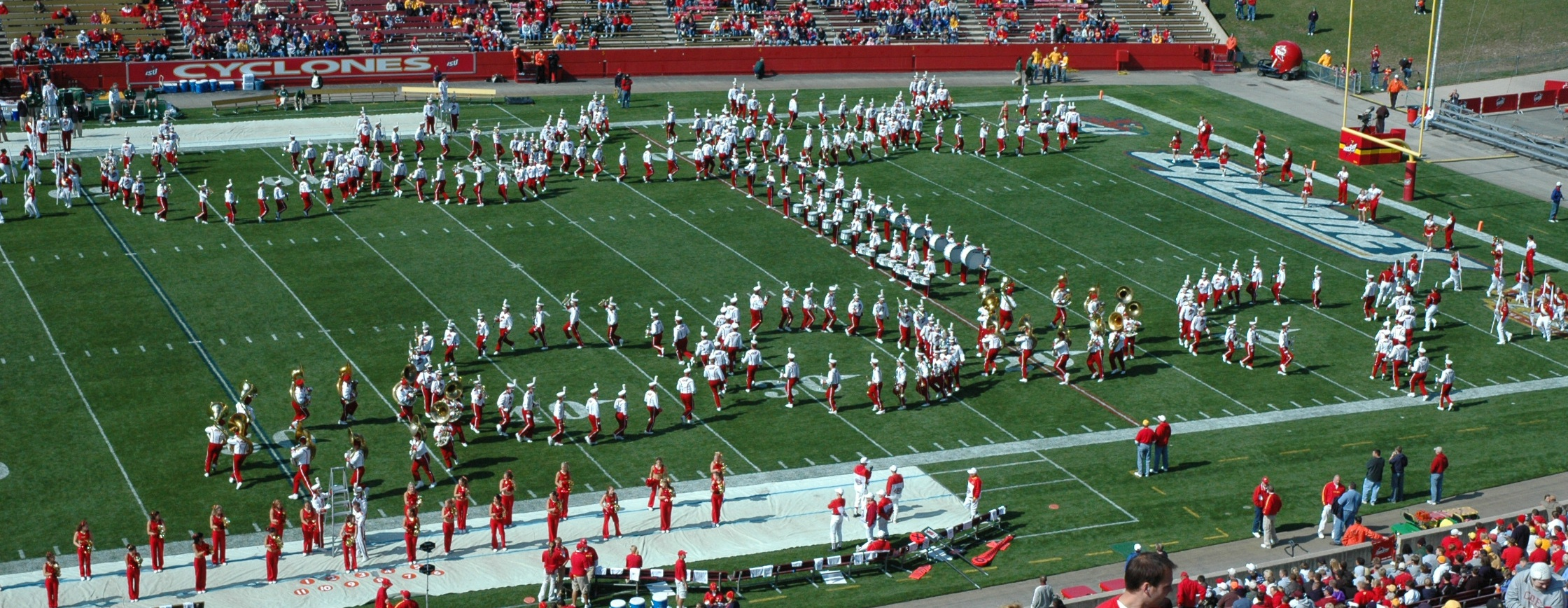
The band's "Cyclone" entrance to the field before playing the "ISU Fanfare" introduction

The ISUCF'V'MB pregame show begins as the drum majors enter the playing field and bring the band to attention with the call of "Go State!" The band enters the field to a double-time "X" drum cadence in alternating clockwise and counterclockwise cyclones, the looping imagery reminiscent of the Cyclones' nickname. Straight lines are formed at five-yard intervals before half the band "unfolds" to form a square block for the presentation of the opening "ISU Fanfare". The band launches into "ISU Fights", the school fight song, and forms a gigantic "ISU" (with flanking lines of flags and Sousaphones), then "floats" it down to midfield and faces the west stands of Jack Trice Stadium.

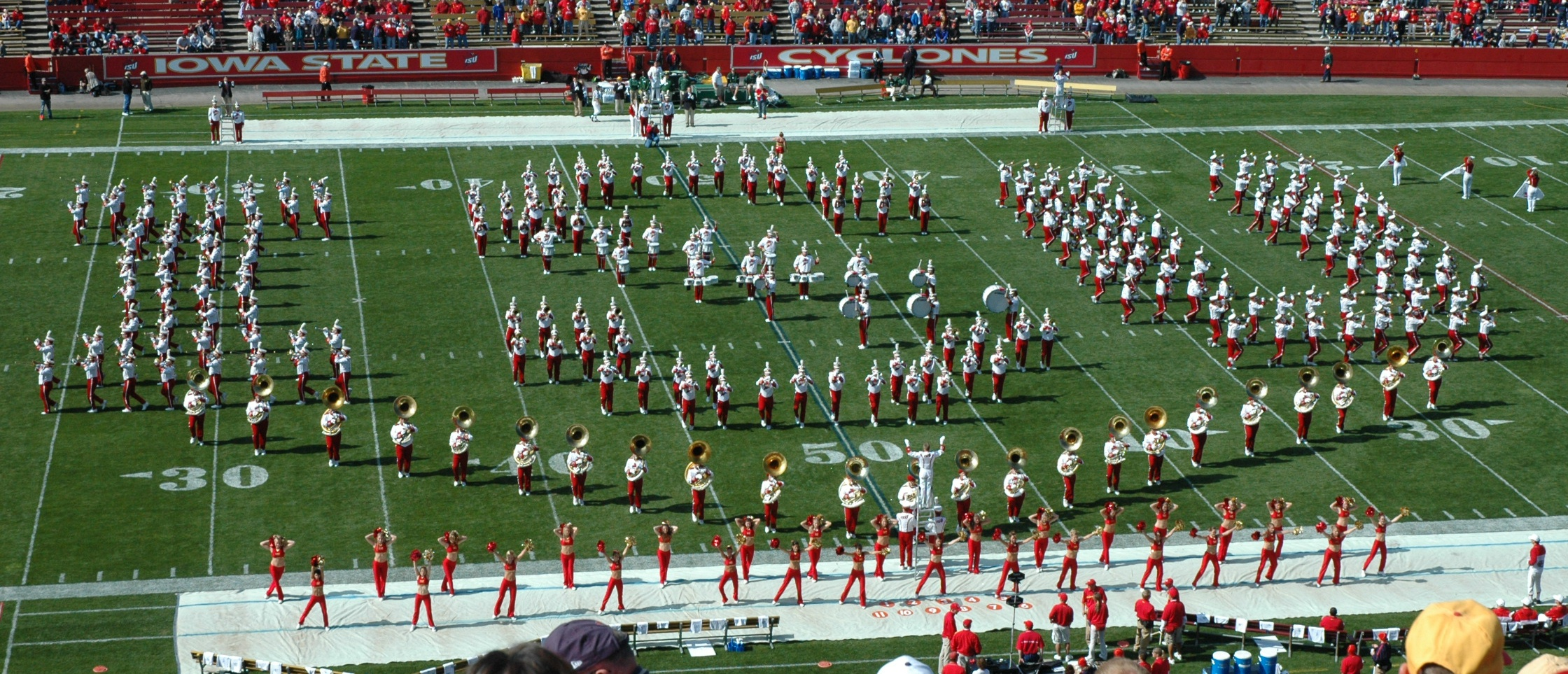
Having flipped the "floating" ISU, the band performs "For I, For S"

The band then turns to face east and plays Wilson's "For I, For S". The students in the "S" mark time while the "I" and the "U" march together to form a grand central block. They then flip and march back out, having reversed the "floating ISU" to face the east stands. "The National Anthem Fanfare" is the next song performed, while the band forms a star-like shape in front of the central 50 yard line ladder. "The Star-Spangled Banner" is played under the colors of Iowa State's Reserve Officer Training Corps unit (conducted by the director of a visiting band if one is present). This is followed by "The Bells of Iowa State"―a song inspired by the Campanile.

The band then plays "Go Cyclones Go!", and transitions into the Iowa State logo.

The band transitions to form the word CYCLONES on the field while playing "ISU Fights", and then turns and marches North while playing "Rise Sons of Iowa State". The band then "swings" to the tunnel formation. Here the band plays the fight song once the football team comes to the field, after which the band runs off to its position in the stands near the Jacobson Athletic Building. All pregame music is memorized by the entire ISUCF'V'MB.

During the 2012 season, some modifications to the pregame show were made. The show still follows the same sequence from entering the field into floating the ISU while playing "Iowa State Fights". "Go Cyclones Go" has been moved later into the show, and the ISU is now flipped / "For I For S" is played immediately after playing "Fights". "God Bless America" has been replaced with a fanfare leading directly into "The Star-Spangled Banner", along with a new star set. Once the National Anthem is complete, a new set depicting the Campanile is formed, along with a new introduction (based upon the Campanile's "Westminster Quarters") being played for "Bells". Following "Bells", "Go Cyclones Go" is now played while forming the university's I-State logo. The band then moves to its spelling of 'CYCLONES' while playing its "First Down" cheer, wherein it again plays "Fights". The band continues to then traditionally 'swing' into the tunnel for the football team.

In 2019, more pregame modifications took place, and the band no longer "swings" to a tunnel formation; instead, the band stops in place after Rise Sons of Iowa State and commences the "Cyclone Power" chant. Once started, the east side of the stadium will chant "Cyclone" and the west side will respond will "Power." When the football team runs onto the field, the band plays the fight song once more, running to the stands when the drum majors give them the call.

=== Halftime ===
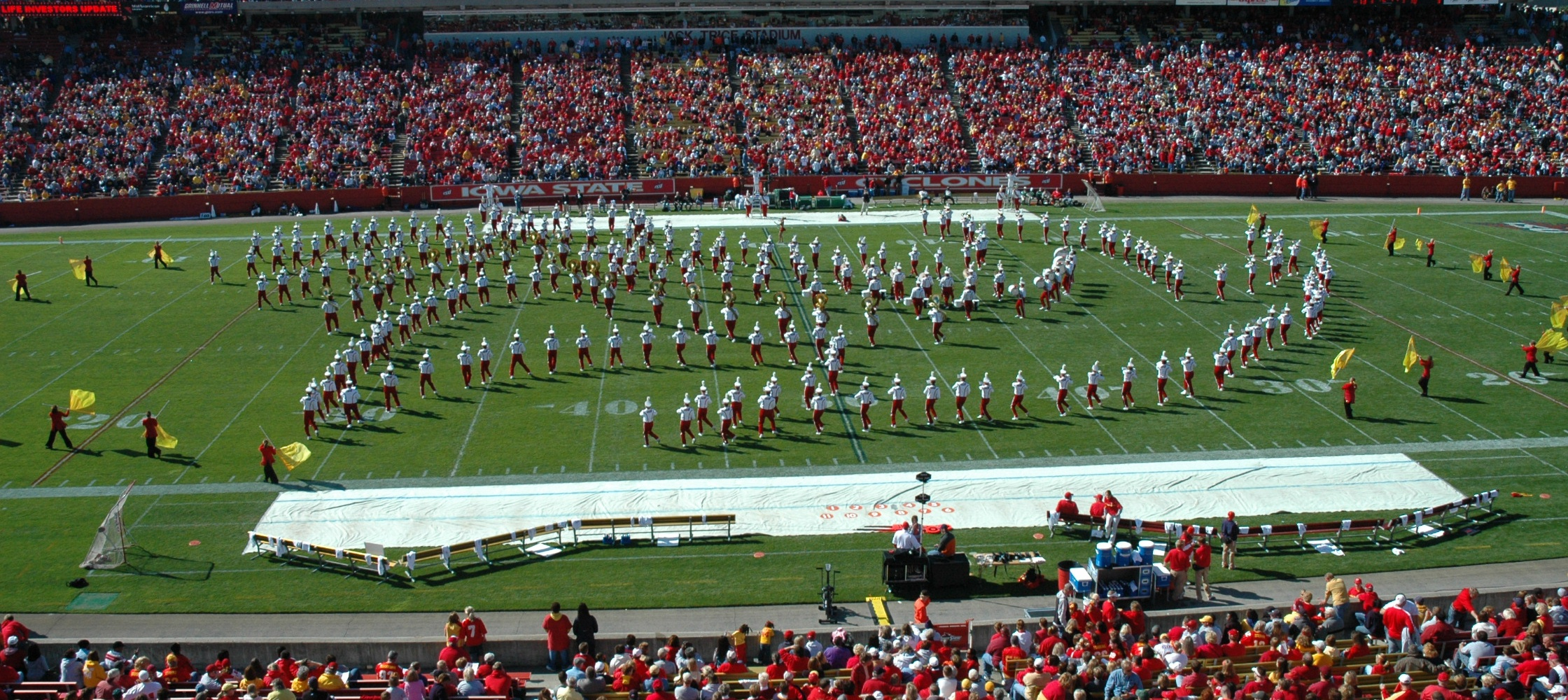
The ISUCF'V'MB moves in unison to "Malaga!" by Bill Holman during an autumn 2005 halftime

The band enters the field at the conclusion to the first half, glide-stepping to drum taps. The song selection of the ISUCF'V'MB is eclectic and varied: classical music, jazz, Latin, movie themes, pop, rock and roll of all decades, show tunes, and swing are all featured. Field formations often reflect the style of music being played—or even the individual song —itself using picture-oriented drills. Two or three songs are selected per halftime, and are performed facing the west stands of Jack Trice Stadium. Occasionally a song may be played facing east to entertain the opposite stands. Solos (usually on trombone or trumpet) are sometimes part of the presentation, and the pregame "high-step" is often used for dramatic effect at the finale. Favorite tunes from the year are chosen for a "recycle" show for the last game of every year, the choice of songs given to the seniors in the band. Every halftime performance concludes with "ISU Fights" as the band high steps off the field before the second half and returns to the stands.

As recently at 2019, the band no longer glide-steps onto the field to drum taps. At the beginning of each halftime performance, the band will line the east side of the field and run onto the field to their positions when the drum majors blow their whistles (a technique termed "bravehearting").

=== The stands ===
The ISUCF'V'MB watches the game before a kick-off

The band also performs in the stands between plays and during timeouts. For offense, the ISUCF'V'MB has specific fanfares for first and third down, and the drumline repeats cadence for every second down. "ISU Fights" is played after Cyclone touchdowns, and "For I, For S" is played after successful field goals and extra points.

Songs for defense are louder, more bombastic, laced with power chords, in hopes of disrupting the opposing teams' pre-play preparations. Other songs played include arrangements of Little Mix's "Wings", Demi Lovato's "Confident", and The Lonely Island's "I'm on a Boat". The drum majors organize a "Roving Band" in the second half that parades around the stadium and up into the stands, playing fight songs and doing cheers. The band has the tradition of reversing their baseball caps after Cyclones win, often playing an arrangement of Sweet Caroline.

Recently, the "Roving Band" has been replaced with State Storm, a sub-section of the Cyclone Marching Band. Additionally, a tailgating band made up of mostly captains and members of the band with exceptional musicianship will be put together and play for the president of Iowa State (currently Wendy Wintersteen).

== State Storm ==
Beginning in the 2015 football season, a second ensemble "State Storm" was added to the Cyclone Marching Band. This 60-member band plays home football games in the stands alongside the Varsity Band. Storm augments the Varsity Band by parading the tailgating lots and performing previews of halftime selections as well as school songs and cheer favorites. State Storm enters the stadium before the Varsity Band and entertains the student section of the stands prior to the official pregame show. Storm does not march on the field during pregame or halftime. Since this ensemble only learns the halftime music selections and not the show, rehearsals are twice a week versus the five-days-a-week Varsity schedule.

State Storm is also the official athletic pep band for Iowa State University Soccer, Wrestling, and Gymnastics.

Membership in State Storm by audition. During band camp, student musicians audition for both Varsity and Storm, and do not get to choose which band they audition for. Students with top scores are placed into Varsity, then remaining spots are filled into Storm. Although State Storm was created to expand marching band opportunities for student musicians, membership is competitive. As many as 600 students audition for 365 Varsity and 60 Storm spots each year.

== Basketball pep bands ==
Women's basketball pep band members watch the game during the 2007 NCAA tournament in Minneapolis, Minnesota

Interested members of the ISUCF'V'MB can audition for the basketball pep bands for home basketball games at Hilton Coliseum. The pep bands include the same woodwind and brass instruments as the marching band. Percussion consists of a drum kit and a bass guitar. Students receive academic credit for their participation. Auditions consist of an audition etude and sight-reading in front of the directors. Regular rehearsals begin soon thereafter.

The band's uniform is a yellow and red hockey jersey with dark blue jeans and red Converse sneakers, which marks Iowa State as rather informal in pep band circles. Music choices include all fight songs and cheers from the marching band. The sequence of "Celebration" by Kool & the Gang, "Phfft! You Were Gone", and "That's All Folks" of Looney Tunes fame are played after a Cyclones victory. Some of the most successful songs are retained for the next marching band season, as well as a vast selection of past favorites and original student arrangements. Some of the most popular and most frequently performed songs include:

- "Ants Marching" by the Dave Matthews Band
- "Birdland" by Weather Report
- A medley of "Black Dog" and "Kashmir" by Led Zeppelin
- "Come on Eileen" by Dexys Midnight Runners
- "Take On Me by a-ha
- "Thriller" by Michael Jackson
- "Throwdown" by Roland Barrett

== Student traditions ==
The front of the mellophone shirt from 2006 showing the mouse and a musical instrument

- Sectional clothing: Before homecoming each year, each section creates some unique article of clothing to represent themselves―generally a T-shirt, though in the past capes or long underwear have been used. The members of the section are listed by rank and number on the back. Shirts from previous years are worn by returning members in reverse order during homecoming week, culminating with the unveiling of the newest shirt on Friday.
- Hockey Pep Band: This is an unofficial pep band organized in support of the university's men's hockey club. In recent years they were sponsored by the Coach of the hockey team, and are an official club within Iowa State University. While small and modest, it has persisted for over a decade through new membership and alumni contributions.
- Homecoming is always a festive time for the band; the night before the game no exception. Current band members and alumni gather at the Music Hall before midnight and sneak to the Campanile to play for the gathered crowd under fireworks. The group then proceeds to Lake LaVerne to sing "The Bells of Iowa State" for the swans Sir Lancelot and Elaine, and then plays fight songs and favorites up and down Welch Avenue near the university into the early morning. They gather in the Friley Hall courtyard, play the entire pregame sequence, and then retire to rise early for the day's football game.
- Another annual tradition is the band banquet, a semi-formal party and dance held in the Great Hall of the Memorial Union. A slide show of photos submitted by the students is shown, along with a video of sketches and parodies performed by the senior members, leadership, and directors of the group.

== Past directors ==
- 1944 - 1967 Frank Piersol <via obituary>
- 1973 - 1979 Joseph Christensen
- 1980 - 1983 James McKinney
- 1984 – 1985 Will Rapp
- 1986 – 1995 Roger Cichy
- 1995 – 1996 John LaCongnata
- 1996 – 2002 Martin Province
- 2002 – 2010 Matthew Smith
- 2010 (interim) Natalie Steele
- 2011 – 2017 Steven Smyth
- 2017 – Present Christian Carichner
