= Camel Walk =

Ragtime dance popular in the 1960s

The camel walk is an American ragtime dance that was popular in the 1960s. James Brown often used this dance in his routine when he performed on stage.

== Origin ==
The camel walk originated as a ragtime dance in the early 20th century. It was referred to as an "animal ragtime dance", due to the nature of the dance.

== The dance ==
The original camel walk started out in vaudeville shows during the early part of the 20th century. It became popular with college students, most notably "flappers", as a social dance during the 1910s and 1920s. The dance received disapproval from the general public, as the female dancers would often rest their heads upon the lead dancer's shoulder as they danced. This was seen as vulgar at the time. Despite the negative reputation, the camel walk remained popular through much of the 20th century.

== 1950s/1960s variant ==
The camel walk entered the 1950s and 1960s as a retro dance. However, unlike the group dance that it was in the 1920s, this version of the camel walk was more of a solo act. One notable performer of this dance was James Brown, who performed it when doing concerts and stage shows. Another performer of this dance was Arkansas Rockabilly singer Ronnie Hawkins. Parts of the 1950s/1960s camel walk were used in Michael Jackson's version of the memorable moonwalk dance. He also used it in the 90s.

== See also ==
- Southern Culture on the Skids, rock band known for their song titled “Camel Walk”
