= Spinout (video game) =

2008 video game

- Developer: Icon Games
- Publisher: Ghostlight
- Platforms: PSP, PS2
- Release: EU: March 20, 2008
- Genre: Racing
- Modes: Single-player, multiplayer

Spinout, also released as RealPlay PuzzleSphere and Vertigo, is a video game developed by UK-based developer Icon Games. It was released on PlayStation Portable in 2008. It is an arcade-style racing game where the player races in a spherical object, called a Xorb (the idea is derived from the real-life sport of zorbing). The 54 tracks raced on are set high above the ground, in 9 different environments. Features include 4 person multiplayer, Xorb customisation, and unlockable rewards. The game was also released on the PlayStation 2 under the title Realplay Puzzlesphere, which came with a bespoke controller.
