= If Every Day Was Like Christmas =

Single by Elvis Presley

from the album Elvis' Christmas Album (1970)
- B-side: "How Would You Like to Be"
- Released: November 15, 1966
- Recorded: June 10, 1966
- Studio: RCA Studio B, Nashville
- Genre: Christmas
- Length: 2:51
- Label: RCA Victor
- Songwriter: Red West

Elvis Presley singles chronology
"Spinout" / "All That I Am" (1966)	"If Every Day Was Like Christmas" (1966)	"Indescribably Blue" (1967)

"If Every Day Was Like Christmas" is a song written in 1965 by Red West and popularized by his friend and employer Elvis Presley in 1966 when he recorded and released it as a single. Presley released it again in 1970 on his Camden Elvis' Christmas Album.

== Background ==
Around August 1965, Presley's friend and bodyguard Red West wrote the song "in about an hour, and [sic] hour and a half". He recorded it and released it the same year under his own label for the 1965 Christmas season, with little success. The following year, he gave the song to Presley to record, as Presley had been wanting to record a Christmas song. The backing track was recorded on June 10, 1966, at RCA Studio B in Nashville, with background vocals provided by Millie Kirkham, The Jordanaires, and The Imperials Quartet. Two days later, on June 12, Presley's vocals were added. According to West, the vocals were sung and recorded in a hotel room after an enthusiastic Presley heard a copy of the just-recorded backing track on a two-track tape recorder. The song was released on November 15, 1966, as an RCA Victor 45 single, 47-8950, backed with "How Would You Like To Be" from the movie It Happened at the World's Fair.

The song was included on the 1970 RCA Camden reissue of Elvis' Christmas Album collection, which was re-released by Pickwick Records in 1975 and by RCA in 1985. The album was certified Diamond by the RIAA in 2011 with sales of over 10 million copies.

== Personnel ==
- Guitar: Harold Bradley, Scotty Moore, Chip Young.
- Bass: Bob Moore.
- Drums: D. J. Fontana.
- Drums & timpani: Buddy Harman.
- Piano: David Briggs.
- Organ: Henry Slaughter.
- Steel guitar: Pete Drake.
- Saxophone: Rufus Long.
- Backing vocals: Millie Kirkham, June Page, Dolores Edgin, The Jordanaires, The Imperials

== Charts ==
The single reached No. 2 on the Billboard "Best Bets For Christmas" survey in 1966, and returned to the chart in 1967, spending a total of eight weeks in the chart. In the United Kingdom, the song reached No. 9 in the UK Singles Chart in December 1966.
