= Spinout (soundtrack) =

Soundtrack album by Elvis Presley
- Released: October 24, 1966
- Recorded: February, May–June 1966
- Studio: Radio Recorders (Hollywood)
- Genre: Rock and roll
- Length: 29:23
- Label: RCA Victor
- Producer: George Stoll

Elvis Presley chronology
Paradise, Hawaiian Style (1966)	Spinout (1966)	How Great Thou Art (1967)

Singles from Spinout
- 1. "Spinout"/"All That I Am" Released: September 13, 1966

Professional ratings
Review scores
Source	Rating
AllMusic	3/5 stars

Spinout is the 14th soundtrack album by American singer and musician Elvis Presley, released by RCA Victor in mono and stereo, LPM/LSP 3702, on October 24, 1966. It is the soundtrack to the 1966 film of the same name starring Presley. Recording sessions for the film songs took place at Radio Recorders in Hollywood, California, on February 16 and 17, 1966. The album was augmented with three non-film songs recorded later that year. It peaked at number 18 on the Top Pop Albums chart.

== Background ==
In early 1966, executives at RCA and Presley's manager, Colonel Tom Parker, had arrived at the same conclusion. They could no longer expect records of only soundtrack recordings and session leftovers to perform as strongly as in the past. Popular music was rife with changes in the mid-1960s, Soundtrack sales were plunging, shifting fewer units and peaking at lower positions on the chart.

== Content ==
The Spinout sessions still adhered to the same formula of the past four years. Nine songs were recorded for the soundtrack, all of which appeared in the film. Most of the songs derived from the standard pool of songwriters, their publishing rights signed over to Elvis Presley Music and Gladys Music, the companies owned by Elvis and the Colonel. One song, "Stop, Look, and Listen", was previously recorded by Ricky Nelson and Bill Haley & His Comets. Two songs were released as a single the month before the film's premiere, the title track backed with "All That I Am", and although both sides charted independently the A-side just barely made the Top 40.

Acknowledging shifts in taste, three additional tracks of a contemporary nature were added as a "special bonus" to bring the album up to a more acceptable running time. Recorded at RCA Studio B in Nashville, Tennessee during the sessions for his gospel album How Great Thou Art early in 1966, two were rhythm and blues songs. The other was "Tomorrow Is a Long Time", an original by Bob Dylan (publishing rights for which were, of course, not signed over to Presley and Parker), with a ballad from a later Nashville session in June. "Down in the Alley" had been released in 1957 by the Clovers, and Presley knew of and appreciated the Dylan song from the version on Odetta Sings Dylan by the folk singer Odetta. Presley's recording exceeded five minutes in length, making it the longest studio recorded he ever released, but with a length that (at that time) was considered too long for release as a single. "I'll Remember You" had been a record by Don Ho, and reflected Presley's infatuation with Hawaii and its culture. Its songwriter, Kui Lee, died of cancer only a few months after the album's release; Presley's later Aloha from Hawaii via Satellite concert (on which he performed "I'll Remember You") was a fund-raiser for a cancer fund set up in Lee's name.

Even with these inclusions, the album fared little better than its predecessors in 1966.

Dylan confessed to Rolling Stone in June 1969 that Presley's version of "Tomorrow Is a Long Time" was the cover of one of his songs that he "treasured the most". The three additional songs can be found on From Nashville to Memphis: The Essential 60s Masters, while three songs from the film soundtrack appeared on Command Performances: The Essential 60s Masters II: "Spinout", "All That I Am", and "I'll Be Back".

== Reissues ==
In 1994, RCA reissued the Spinout and Double Trouble soundtrack albums on a "Double Feature" CD. Spinout was reissued in 2004 on the Follow That Dream label in a special edition that contained the original album tracks along with numerous alternate takes.

== Track listing ==
=== Original release ===
Side one
No.	Title	Writer(s)	Recording date	Length
1.	"Stop, Look and Listen"	Joy Byers	February 16, 1966	1:31
2.	"Adam and Evil"	Fred Wise and Randy Starr	February 17, 1966	1:55
3.	"All That I Am"	Sid Tepper and Roy C. Bennett	February 17, 1966	2:15
4.	"Never Say Yes"	Doc Pomus and Mort Shuman	February 17, 1966	1:53
5.	"Am I Ready"	Sid Tepper and Roy C. Bennett	February 16, 1966	2:26
6.	"Beach Shack"	Bill Giant, Bernie Baum, Florence Kaye	February 16, 1966	1:48

Side two
No.	Title	Writer(s)	Recording date	Length
1.	"Spinout"	Ben Weisman, Dolores Fuller, Sid Wayne	February 17, 1966	2:32
2.	"Smörgåsbord"	Sid Tepper and Roy C. Bennett	February 16, 1966	2:01
3.	"I'll Be Back"	Ben Weisman and Sid Wayne	February 17, 1966	2:02
4.	"Tomorrow Is A Long Time" (bonus track)	Bob Dylan	May 26, 1966	5:20
5.	"Down in the Alley" (bonus track)	Jesse Stone	May 26, 1966	2:48
6.	"I'll Remember You" (bonus track)	Kui Lee	June 10, 1966	2:52

Note

- "Spinout" was released as a single in October 1966 with "All That I Am" as its B-side. The songs reached number 40 and 41, respectively, in the United States on the Billboard Hot 100 chart and, respectively, numbers 21 and 18 in the United Kingdom.

=== 2004 Follow That Dream CD reissue ===
Original release
No.	Title	Length
1.	"Stop Look and Listen"	1:32
2.	"Adam and Evil"	1:54
3.	"All That I Am"	2:17
4.	"Never Say Yes"	1:54
5.	"Am I Ready"	2:26
6.	"Beach Shack"	1:49
7.	"Spinout"	2:34
8.	"Smorgasbord"	1:57
9.	"I'll Be Back"	2:05

Original bonus songs
No.	Title	Length
10.	"Tomorrow is a Long Time"	5:26
11.	"Down in the Alley"	2:52
12.	"I'll Remember You"	4:09

New bonus songs
No.	Title	Length
13.	"Stop Look And Listen" (takes 1, 2, 3)	3:43
14.	"Am I Ready" (take 1)	2:28
15.	"Never Say Yes" (takes 1, 2)	2:40
16.	"Spinout" (takes 1, 2)	3:26
17.	"All That I Am" (takes 1, 2)	3:57
18.	"Adam And Evil" (takes 1, 14, 16)	5:51
19.	"Smorgasbord" (take 1)	2:18
20.	"Beach Shack" (takes 1, 2, 3)	3:47
21.	"Am I Ready" (takes 3, 4)	2:51
22.	"Never Say Yes" (takes 4, 5)	2:17
23.	"All That I Am" (take 4)	2:42
24.	"Stop Look And Listen" (take 6)	1:34
25.	"Smorgasbord" (take 5)	2:26

== Personnel ==
- Elvis Presley – vocals
- The Jordanaires – backing vocals
- Boots Randolph – saxophone
- Scotty Moore – electric guitar
- Tommy Tedesco – electric guitar
- Tiny Timbrell – acoustic guitar
- Floyd Cramer – piano
- Charlie Hodge – piano (on "Beach Shack")
- Bob Moore – double bass
- D.J. Fontana – drums
- Buddy Harman – drums

== Charts ==
Album

Year	Chart	Position
1966	Billboard Pop Albums	18
