= James Coats (disambiguation) =

James Coats was a British skeleton racer and baronet.

James Coats or Coates may also refer to:

- Sir James Coats, 1st Baronet (1834–1913), of the Coats baronets
- James B. Coats, Baptist minister and songwriter elected to the Gospel Music Hall of Fame
- Jim Coates (1932–2019), former United States Major League Baseball pitcher
- James Coates (banker) (1851–1935), New Zealand sportsman and banker
- James Coates (parliamentary official) (1815–1854), parliamentary official and pioneer of Auckland, New Zealand
- James Coates (politician), American minister and member of the Council of the District of Columbia
- James Coates (British Army officer) (1740–1822)
- James Henry Coates, America Union Army officer
- Jim Coats, Australian cricketer
- Jim Coates, American baseball pitcher

== See also ==
- Jimmy Coates, a series of children's books
- Coats (surname)
