= Spinout (song) =

- Picture sleeve for the U.S. vinyl single, with "All That I Am" in smaller font

Single by Elvis Presley

from the album Spinout
- B-side: "All That I Am"
- Released: September 13, 1966
- Recorded: February 17, 1966
- Studio: Radio Recorders, Hollywood
- Genre: Rock and roll
- Length: 2:32
- Label: RCA
- Songwriters: Ben Weisman; Dolores Fuller; Sid Wayne

Elvis Presley singles chronology
"Come What May" (1966)	"Spinout" (1966)	"If Every Day Was Like Christmas" (1966)

"Spinout" is a song first recorded by Elvis Presley as part of the soundtrack for his 1966 motion picture Spinout. In 1966 it was released on a single with "All That I Am", another song from the same movie, on the opposite side. It peaked at number 40 on the Billboard Hot 100 but would continue to sell over 400,000 copies. ("All That I Am" also charted, peaking at number 41.)

== Critical reception ==
John Floyd, the author of the book Sun Records: An Oral History, considers "Spinout" a great song, naming it along other great songs from "Presley's seriously underrated sixties and seventies work": "Can't Help Falling in Love", "You Don't Know Me", "Long Black Limousine", "Suspicious Minds", and "I Can Help".

== Charts ==
Chart (1966)	Peak position
US Billboard Hot 100	40
