= Spinout (film) =

1966 film by Norman Taurog, starring Elvis Presley

- Theatrical release poster
- Directed by: Norman Taurog
- Written by: Theodore J. Flicker; George Kirgo
- Produced by: Joe Pasternak
- Starring: Elvis Presley; Shelley Fabares; Deborah Walley; Diane McBain; Jack Mullaney; Will Hutchins; Warren Berlinger; Jimmy Hawkins; Dodie Marshall; Una Merkel; Cecil Kellaway; Carl Betz
- Cinematography: Daniel L. Fapp
- Edited by: Rita Roland
- Music by: George Stoll
- Production company: Metro-Goldwyn-Mayer
- Distributed by: Metro-Goldwyn-Mayer
- Release date: October 17, 1966 (US)
- Running time: 93 minutes
- Country: United States
- Language: English
- Box office: $3,000,000 (est. US/ Canada rentals)

Spinout is a 1966 American musical comedy film starring Elvis Presley as the lead singer of a band and part-time race car driver. The film was #57 on the year-end list of the top-grossing films of 1966. It was titled California Holiday in the UK.

== Plot ==
Mike McCoy, the lead singer for a traveling band who is also a part-time race car driver, enjoys his carefree single life, which is threatened by three women who seek to marry him.

Enter Cynthia Foxhugh, a spoiled heiress and "daddy's girl," who is determined to get what she wants, no matter the cost. Such as was the case when Cynthia's millionaire father Howard tricks Mike and his band into interrupting their music tour to travel to Santa Barbara and serenade Cynthia with "Am I Ready" for her birthday. Cynthia becomes first of the three women who want to marry Mike. Also, apparently knowing about Mike's racing skills, Howard is determined to hire Mike to drive Howard's Fox Five car in an upcoming road race, but Mike prefers to race his own car, a Cobra 427 sports car, which he tows around the region with his 1929 Model J Duesenberg.

Meanwhile, Mike is stalked and spied upon by Diana St. Clair, an author of books for women about men. Diana is in the process of writing her new book, The Perfect American Male, and uses Mike as one of her subjects. Actually, she later reveals to Mike that he is the "perfect American male," thereby planning on Mike to marry her—to the point of already making wedding arrangements.

The female drummer of Mike's band, Les, is looked upon by Mike and the other band members as a tomboy, and becomes fed up with such treatment. Mike and his other band members are taken aback when at a party, Les picks her moment and reveals her true feminine side, walking back out from a room dressed up in an evening dress. She reveals herself as the third woman who wishes to marry Mike.

Faced with this predicament, Mike must decide which of the three women he will marry—after the race (which Mike wins in a car he does not even own). So, he decides to marry all three of them—to other men. Mike marries Cynthia to Phillip, a nervous employee of Howard's who is prone to fainting (he had a secret crush on Cynthia since he has known her, which he finally picks up the nerve to tell her). Next, Mike marries Diana to Howard, who fell in love with each other after they met at one of Mike's parties. And finally, Mike marries Les to Lt. Tracy Richards, a police officer whom Les won her way to his heart through his stomach (he likes her gourmet cooking). This allows Mike to reclaim his single and carefree life, which he dearly enjoys.

== Cast ==
- Elvis Presley as Mike McCoy
- Shelley Fabares as Cynthia Foxhugh
- Diane McBain as Diana St. Clair
- Dodie Marshall as Susan
- Deborah Walley as Les
- Jack Mullaney as "Curly"
- Will Hutchins as Lieutenant Tracy Richards
- Warren Berlinger as Philip Short
- Jimmy Hawkins as Larry
- Carl Betz as Howard Foxhugh
- Cecil Kellaway as Bernard Ranley
- Una Merkel as Violet Ranley
- Frederick Worlock as Blodgett
- Dave Barry as Harry

== Production ==
The film was shot from February 21 to April 7, 1966.

Presley was paid $750,000 plus 40% of the profits.

The racing scenes were shot at Paramount Ranch Raceway.

The script was written by Theodore Flicker and George Kirgo. They originally pitched the idea of a film based on Presley's life, but this was vetoed by Col. Parker. Working titles include Never Say No, Never Say Yes, and The Singing Racing Car Driver. Flicker eventually left the project to work on The President's Analyst and Michael Hoey worked on the script uncredited with Kirgo.

The character of Diana St. Clair was based on Helen Gurley Brown, author of Sex and the Single Girl.

There is a scene in the film where Mike was discussing with his band members the pitfalls of marriage and settling down, and Mike mentions being on the Ed Sullivan Show. This line was likely written as an inside reference to Presley's 1956 appearances on Ed Sullivan.

There is also a scene where Mike and his troupe are having dinner at their makeshift camp when they are approached by a stray dog. Although the dog appeared to be a Labrador Retriever, Mike suddenly exclaims, "Look, a hound dog!" This line was also likely written in as a play on Presley's hit song.

Jack Mullaney, who also appeared with Presley in Tickle Me (1965), plays Curly, one of the male band members.

Jimmy Hawkins, who plays Larry, the other male band member, also appeared with both Presley and Fabares in Girl Happy and coincidentally portrayed one of Presley's band members in that film, as well. He also played Shelley Fabares boyfriend in multiple episodes of The Donna Reed Show.

Carl Betz (Howard) and Shelley Fabares (Cynthia) had played father and daughter before, on The Donna Reed Show.

== Reception ==
A. H. Weiler of The New York Times called the film a "minor variation" on Presley's previous pictures. Variety declared it "an entertaining Elvis Presley comedy-tuner ... Well-produced by Joe Pasternak and directed with verve by Norman Taurog." Kevin Thomas of the Los Angeles Times called it "perhaps [Presley's] best picture yet," with a "first-rate" cast, while writers Theodore J. Flicker and George Kirgo "have managed to parody the typical Presley plot so deftly that they neither insult Elvis nor alienate his devoted fans." The Monthly Film Bulletin wrote that the film was "delivered with sufficient joie de vivre to make its nonsensical compound of ballad and beat, car racing and unlikely romantic complication, entertaining enough in its own way," though the review noted that Presley "largely maintains a rather morose demeanour" throughout the film and that "even his singing style seems to have lost some of its old bounce and energy."

Filmink felt Presley and Fabares had none of the chemistry they showed in Girl Happy and the ending was unsatisfactory as Elvis wound up with none of the three leads.

The film was included in the 1978 book, The Fifty Worst Films of All Time (and How They Got That Way), by Harry Medved, Randy Dreyfuss, and Michael Medved.

== See also ==
- List of American films of 1966

=== DVD reviews ===
- Review by Jeff Rosado at digitallyOBSESSED!, August 4, 2004.
- Review by Bill Treadway at DVD Verdict, August 3, 2004.
- Review by Stuart Galbraith IV at DVD Talk, July 16, 2004.
- Review by Betsy Bozdech at The DVD Journal.
