= Glide step =

Style of marching

The glide step or roll step is a form of movement used by marching bands to minimize upper body movement, enabling musicians to play their instruments and march without air-stream interruptions. Standardizing the style of marching also serves to add to the visual effect of a marching band. Sometimes special shoes are worn with a curved heel that facilitates rolling the foot. Glide stepping is used by many high school and college marching bands, and by many drum corps.

== Technique ==
Glide step seeks to restrict all motion above the upper-body to a smooth, unchanging motion in the direction of travel, and to restrict all motion below the waist to that which is completely necessary.

Before the glide step can be learned, the general posture of the body must be normalized. This is called "attention". The important aspects of attention for marching are having a tall, straight posture with hips shifted slightly back, keeping weight distributed slightly forward and off the heels, and general relaxation of all major muscles. A general guideline for the body's position relative to the rest of the body is the ears should be over the shoulders, the shoulders over the hips, and the hips over the ankles. In the "attention" position, the feet are either together and parallel to each other, or each foot is approximately 30 degrees off of parallel to each other. A call and response is commonly used by bands that follow George N. Parks' training examples to standardize posture: "Feet! (Together!) Stomach! (In!) Chest! (Out!) Shoulders! (Back!) Elbows! (Frozen!) Chin! (Up!) Eyes! (With pride!) Eyes! (With pride!)"

From attention, the next step is to learn mark time. This involves alternately picking up the left and right legs from their position at attention to the "check" position. At "check", the leg is bent slightly, the heel is approximately 1-2 inches off the ground, and the toes are in line with each other. Important aspects of marking time are that the hips should not shift as the legs are lifted and that the weight is kept forward on the balls of the feet. A common command, often called out by a drum major, usually consists of, "Mark time, mark!", followed by four beats of marking time (left, right, left, right) and then the first step with the left foot.

The first step to moving forward is to move the leg from a "check" position to an "extended" position. The heel of the extended foot should be placed slightly inside of "straight ahead" so that about 1/3 of the foot is in front of the stationary foot. In the "extended" position, the weight has not yet shifted forward, but the leg-in-motion has been straightened forward so that the heel is on the ground and the toes are pointed in the air as high as possible. While the body itself should be moving smoothly along, this motion should be very snappy, emphasizing that the toes are stuck in the air so that the bottom of the extended foot is exposed. A common instruction is to "dig in with the heel", which emphasizes starting the step as far back on the heel as possible. This, in turn, should lead to higher toe lift.

Next, the weight is shifted forward from the ball of the stationary foot to the ball of extended foot. This motion is called "rolling through". Because this is the primary "stepping" motion, it is important that it be as fluid as possible. Even after "rolling through", the stationary leg should still be as straight as possible. Only after the weight has been shifted from one foot to the next should the back leg be bent slightly to allow it to glide forward (while the foot remains as close to the ground as possible) into the next "check" position. From this check position, the leg smoothly transitions into the next "extend" position, and so on. At the halfway point of the motion, the moving foot should be passing the ankle of the stationary foot.

Generally there are two standard sizes for a roll step. The most common is 22.5 inches (570 mm) from heel to heel, in the extended position. When executed at this size a marcher that started with the balls of his feet on a yard line will end up with the balls of his feet on the next yard line, five yards away, after taking eight steps; thus, this step is known as the "8 to 5 step". The second increment is slightly larger at 30 inches, and will move five yards in six steps. In order to correctly march these sizes, a performer generally uses muscle memory to execute these steps. The step sizes called for can sometimes be larger than a 6 to 5 step, but generally a marcher will switch to jazz running if the step needs to be larger than a 5 to 5 step.

Other skills utilized in glide-step marching are facings, sliding (keeping the upper body facing a different direction than the lower body), adjusting stride length, back-marching, and matching all of these motions to a specific tempo.

== See also ==
- Ankle knee step
- Chair step
- Drill commands
