= Personal relationships of Elvis Presley =

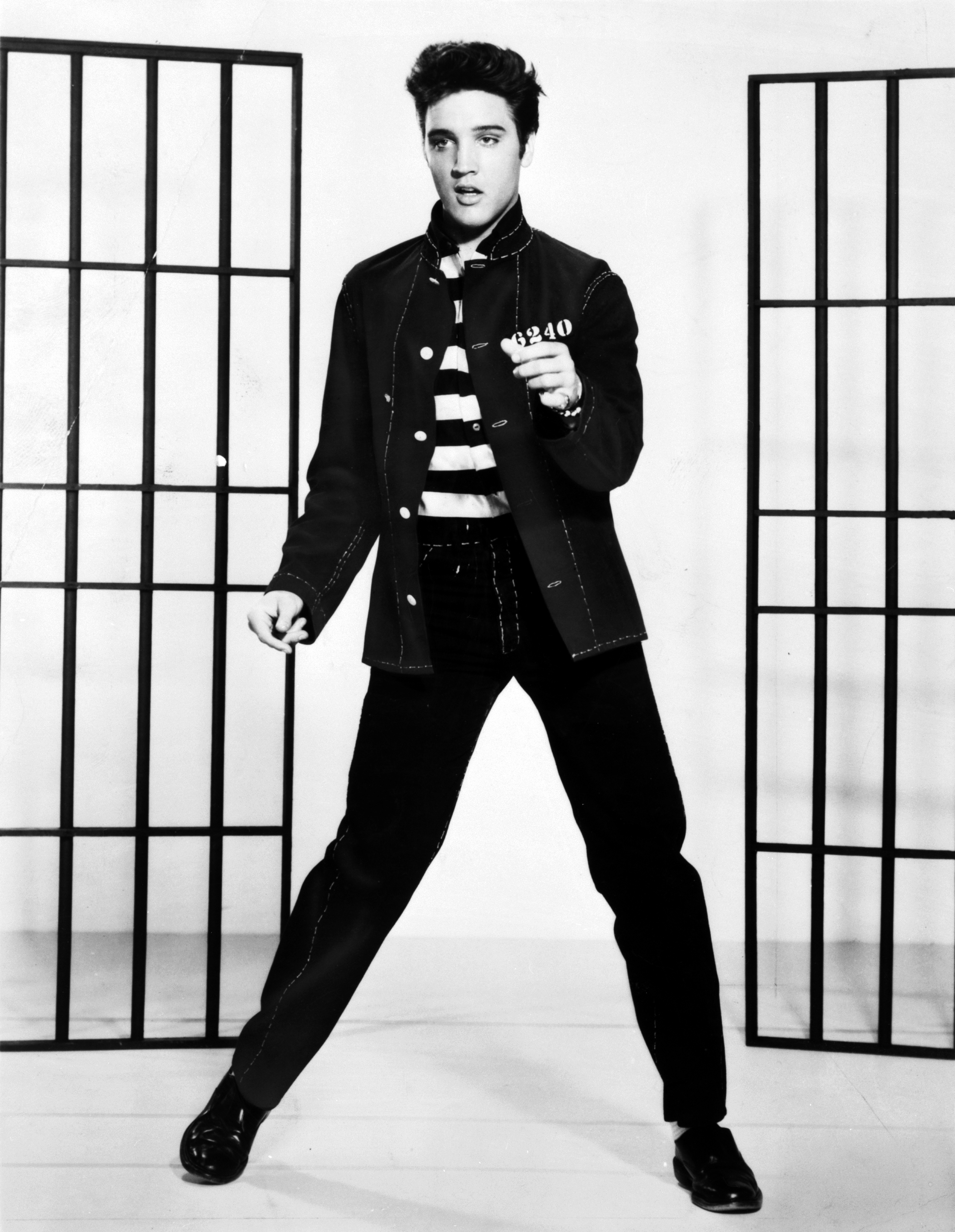
Presley in a publicity photograph for the 1957 film Jailhouse Rock

Elvis Presley obtained many close relationships throughout his career. The preeminent of all his personal relationships, by far, was that he had with his mother Gladys, as described below.

== Devotion to his mother ==
In a newspaper interview with The Memphis Press Scimitar, Presley himself was open about the close relationship to his mother. "She was the number-one girl in his life, and he was dedicating his career to her." Throughout her life, "the son would call her by pet names," and they communicated by baby talk. According to Elaine Dundy, "it was agony for her to leave her child even for a moment with anyone else, to let anyone else touch Elvis." Presley himself said, "My mama never let me out of her sight. I couldn't go down to the creek with the other kids." His father, Vernon Presley, talked about Elvis's close relationship to his mother "after his son became famous, almost as if it were a source of wonder that anyone couldn't be that close to him."

During Presley's rising career, Gladys became despairing, depressed and lonely and began to neglect her health. She put on weight and began to drink every day. She had wanted Elvis to succeed, "but not so that he would be apart from her. The hysteria of the crowd frightened her." Doctors diagnosed liver problems, and Gladys's condition eventually worsened so much that she was admitted to hospital in August 1958. At that time, Presley was in Fort Hood, Texas, to fulfill his military obligations, but he got emergency leave to see her, and a special plane was chartered to take him home on August 12. Gladys died on August 14. Elvis and Vernon were deeply upset by her death, with Elvis "sobbing and crying hysterically," and eyewitnesses relate that he was "grieving almost constantly" for days. During and shortly after the funeral, Judy Spreckels and Nick Adams, Presley's best friends at that time, attempted to comfort the singer.

== High school and early stardom ==
Presley's early experiences being teased by his classmates for being a "mama's boy" may have had an influence on his early dating experiences. He didn't have any friends as a teen. Beginning in his early teens, Presley embarked upon the "indefatigable pursuit of girls," but was totally rebuffed. It was said that at school, anyone wishing to provoke a little girl to tears of rage had only to chalk "Elvis loves -" and then the girl's name on the blackboard when the teacher was out of the room.

His first true sweetheart was the fifteen-year-old Dixie Locke Emmons, whom the singer dated steadily after graduating from Humes and during his Sun Records time. While still a rising star, Presley also had a relationship with June Juanico, who is said to have been the only girl his mother ever approved of, and according to Juanico, she "never had sex with Presley." In Juanico's book Elvis in the Twilight of Memory, she stated she was afraid of getting pregnant. However, since the singer's death, many claims to relationships have been made by women who were no more than acquaintances or had short affairs which were exaggerated for personal gain. Juanico even blames Elvis's manager, Colonel Thomas Parker, for encouraging Presley to go out with beautiful women only "for the publicity."

Between 1954 and 1956, when his stardom began to rise, Presley became the subject of adoration by young Hollywood starlets such as Natalie Wood, Judy Tyler, Shelley Fabares, and Connie Stevens. It was said that his mother believed that Wood was a schemer who hoped to "snare" the singer only "for publicity purposes." When a columnist wanted to know if the romance with Presley was "serious," Wood's answer was, "Not right now. But who knows what will happen?" One of her judgments of Presley was, "He can sing but he can't do much else."

== The main women in his life ==
Several authors have written that "Elvis busied his evenings with various girlfriends" or that his "list of one-night stands would fill volumes." Actress Anne Helm, for instance, has stated that Presley "really liked sex" and "I had fun." She further claimed that Presley loved the flouncy, yellow baby-doll nightie he had bought her, and that he gave her pills after having sex with her.

It is unclear whether Presley actually had sexual intercourse with most of the women he dated. His early girlfriends Barbara Hearn and June Juanico say that they had no sexual relationships with Presley, and there were several women with whom Presley quickly bypassed sexuality altogether, settling into comfortable friendships. Spreckels, singer Betty Amos, hairstylist Patti Parry, and others close to Presley all filled sisterly roles for him. Despite claiming no sexual relationship with Presley, June Juanico did say in an interview for the movie Elvis 1956, "I will not say what happened between us. It is personal." Byron Raphael and Alanna Nash have stated that the star "would never put himself inside one of these girls..." (for a number of reasons).

Albert Goldman speculated that Presley preferred voyeurism over normal sexual relations with women. Goldman went on to suggest that during his military service, Presley had "discovered prostitutes and picked up the intense fear of sexually transmitted diseases which led to claims that he had a morbid fear of sexual penetration." Alanna Nash, in her book 'Baby, Let's Play House': Elvis Presley and the Women Who Loved Him (2010), reveals a need in Presley to play Pygmalion and father to very young girls, whom he delighted in making over. A late-blooming "Mama's boy," she argues, young Elvis was a flop with girls and super-religious.

Actress Rita Moreno has also acknowledged that she dated Elvis "several times," though she described their romance as brief, claiming that he was "sweet, but boring."

Other women whom Elvis Presley dated included Dottie Harmony, Pat Sheehan, Pat Mowry, and Yvonne Lime.

June Juanico "recalls a time when she stood up to Elvis in front of his band of hangers-on, who even then were beginning to accompany him everywhere. He grabbed her arm, took her into the bathroom and declared: 'Look, you are so right, I am really sorry.' He kept her there for five minutes, then swaggered out, his image intact." Julie Parrish, Presley's co-star in Paradise Hawaiian Style, relates, "One time on set I had a real pain in my side – a side-effect, I think – and Elvis scooped me up, carried me into his trailer and shut the door. Outside the crew was waiting and wondering, but Elvis was oblivious to the innuendo. He placed his hand over my side and tried to do some healing on me." Playboy star and actress June Wilkinson remembered that she "met Elvis on the set of King Creole. He invited me to dinner at the Beverly Wilshire Hotel. ... Then Elvis gave me a tour of his suite, sat me on the bed in his bedroom and sang to me for two hours. That was it. The next day ... we had dinner again. He was very sweet, and he was friendly. He had more than sex on his mind. He got me to the airport on time, and our paths never crossed again."

However, the singer may not have always been sweet and friendly towards women. When Christina Crawford, the adopted daughter of Joan Crawford, visited Presley, they were watching Bonanza in the TV room. She was not a friend of Presley. "Elvis had been puffing on a cigar ... as Christina tickled him and kidded around, apparently seeking more direct attention." Suddenly, as Buzz Cason relates, "she slung the contents of her cocktail glass right into Elvis's face. ... The cigar went 'phhhtttt' and he jumped up. ... He grabbed her by the hair. 'Get this bitch out of here!' he screamed, leading her toward the front door as she struggled to keep up with the rather quick pace as he was pulling her locks. Turmoil ensued as the 'boys' scrambled to assist trying to prevent too big of a scene... " Presley said to Cason that he was sorry and not raised to treat a woman like that. In his book, Joe Esposito (who was the one dating Crawford) confirmed that this behavior was out of character for Presley. Sonny West who was also there agreed with Esposito and noticed that Presley and Christina patched things up when he saw them getting along very well on a set one week later.

Peggy Lipton claims that Presley was "with me, at least, he was virtually impotent". Cassandra Peterson, better known as "Elvira", says she knew Presley for only one night and all they did was talk. Peterson said to Larry King that they actually met during a party and Presley told her to leave Vegas because she was the youngest show girl in Vegas at that time.

These claims are directly contradicted by comments from actresses like Cybill Shepherd, who acknowledged her affair with the singer and was said to have introduced Presley to certain amorous techniques. However, the "much-quoted claims that she taught him the joys of oral sex is viewed with skepticism by other lovers of the King." In an interview, Shepherd said that Presley kissed her all over her naked body – but refused to have oral sex with her. Presley said to her, "Me and the guys talk and, well, we don't eat pussy." She always knew their relationship was doomed and they wouldn't last as a couple. She says, "The fact is, Elvis got hooked on speed in the army. ... Then it got out of control. Did I want to be with someone who would have dragged me down? The only way to have stayed with Elvis was by doing drugs." In fact, they met at a time (July 1972) when they were both involved in much more significant relationships: Peter Bogdanovich for her and Linda Thompson for Presley.

Presley had a brief relationship with then-18-year-old actress Cheryl Holdridge in 1963, when they dated every night for a week. During this time he took her to the Los Angeles premiere of It Happened at the World's Fair. After the premiere, Presley made a trip back to Memphis to spend time with his father before filming started on Viva Las Vegas. Upset that Presley left suddenly without telling her, Holdridge sent Presley an angry letter in which she scolded him for doing so. Amused that she cared for him as much as she did, Presley sent a letter back to Holdridge that read "Sorry Cheesy! E.P." and a 20-pound mound of cheddar cheese ("Cheesy" was a nickname Holdridge earned while on The Mickey Mouse Club). In an interview with 'Teen Magazine, Holdridge confirmed the two were dating and stated "When I talk about going out with Elvis, I mean visiting him at his home for parties with his friends. Elvis can't go out because he's always recognized and it spoils his fun, so he invites friends up for the evening. A group of girls go up to the house, have dinner, listen to records, dance, and generally just have a quiet social evening."

In her memoir, Ann-Margret (Presley's co-star in Viva Las Vegas) refers to Presley as her "soulmate", but very little is revealed about their long-rumored romance, only that "in a moment of tenderness" he bought her a round bed in hot pink colors.

It is speculated that Presley dated many female co-stars from his movies primarily for publicity purposes. 17-year-old actress Lori Williams and the singer, for instance, went out together for a while "between the making of Roustabout and Kissin' Cousins." She says their "courtship was not some bizarre story. It was very sweet and Elvis was the perfect gentleman." She also claims that Ann-Margret "was the love of his life." Significantly, there was a great publicity campaign about the romance between Presley and Ann-Margret during the 1963 filming of Viva Las Vegas and the following weeks, which helped to increase the popularity of the young Hollywood beauty. Ann-Margret remained close to Presley for the remainder of his life and also attended his funeral.

The vast majority of books (including both of Guralnick's books) on Presley contain details of his many romances and alleged affairs, including many while he was married to Priscilla. It has also been reported that Presley "adored to fondle and suck women's toes, and those in his entourage who were given the job of choosing companions for him would often be asked to check the girls' feet."

According to Alan Fortas, an all-Memphis football halfback who became a bodyguard and part of the Presley entourage, "Elvis needed someone to baby more than he needed a sex partner. He craved the attention of someone who adored him without the threat of sexual pressure, much as a mother would." Furthermore, "Elvis befriended some of the young girls who used to cluster adoringly in his driveway, or outside the fence ... Some of the girls were as young as fourteen." Fortas said they were frequent houseguests who attended his concerts as part of 'Elvis's personal traveling show.' Out in the backyard, they romped with Presley in the Doughboy pool and challenged him to watermelon-seed spitting contests. They also slipped into his bedroom for ... rambunctious pillow fights. Sometimes they would all sit cross-legged with him on the bed, flipping through his fan magazines or admiring his stuffed-animal collection. Often they would all lie down together and cuddle. But what went on was horseplay, not foreplay." Therefore, Guralnick writes that for "the more experienced girls it wasn't like with other Hollywood stars or even with other more sophisticated boys they knew." Although they offered to do things for Presley, "he wasn't really interested. What he liked to do was to lie in bed and watch television and eat and talk all night..."

Dolores Hart was the female love interest from Presley's second and fourth movies. She asserts that she did not have an intimate relationship with her costar. Five years after her last movie with Presley, she left Hollywood to become a Benedictine nun. The 2011 documentary God Is the Bigger Elvis covers their relationship.

Anita Wood, another girl whom the singer's mother hoped Presley would eventually marry, was with him as he rose to superstardom, served in the US military and returned home in 1960. She lived at Graceland for a time, though the star, according to his own words, did not have sex with her. She moved out after confronting him over Priscilla Presley, then known as Priscilla Beaulieu.

== Priscilla Presley (née Wagner, formerly Beaulieu) ==
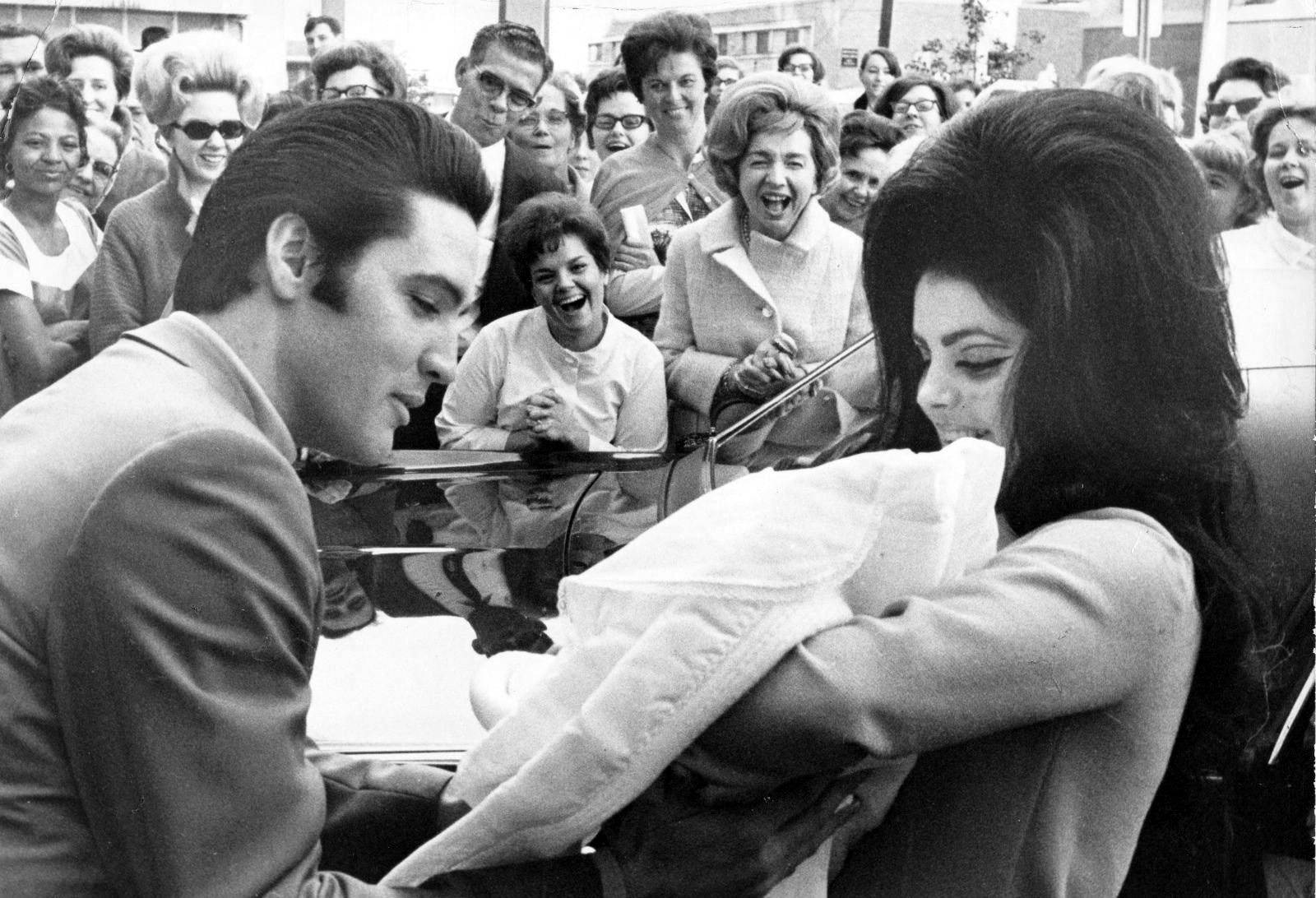
Elvis and Priscilla with Lisa Marie in February 1968

Presley and Priscilla Beaulieu (née Wagner) first met in 1959 while Presley was stationed in Germany with the U.S. Army. Priscilla was 14 years old when Elvis met her." George Klein asked Presley what he was saying to Presley when the picture of their divorce was taken in October 1973. "We met as friends we part as friends" was Presley's answer.

In 1963, Presley managed to talk the reluctant Beaulieus into allowing their teenage daughter to live with his father, Vernon, and stepmother, Dee Presley, at a home Elvis purchased on Hermitage Drive in Memphis located at the back of Graceland. According to Anita Wood, it's Priscilla who begged Elvis to let her see him in United States. However, that arrangement lasted only a matter of weeks, Priscilla slipping back and forth between Vernon's house and Graceland. In her 1985 autobiography, Elvis and Me, written with author Sandra Harmon, Priscilla describes Presley as a very passionate man who was not overtly sexual towards her. According to her account, the singer told her that they had to wait until they were married before having intercourse. He said, "I'm not saying we can't do other things. It's just the actual encounter. I want to save it." Priscilla says in her autobiography that she and Elvis did not have sex until their wedding night, and that she married as a virgin. However, this claim is questioned by biographer Suzanne Finstad and members of the Memphis Mafia.

They married on May 1, 1967, in Las Vegas, Nevada, Lisa Marie was born nine months later on February 1, 1968, in Memphis, Tennessee. In her book, Elvis and Me, Priscilla describes her daily life with her husband. She also says that Presley became fascinated with the occult and metaphysical phenomena and an addict to prescription drugs, which dramatically changed his personality from playful to being passive and introverted. The Presleys separated on February 24, 1972. Elvis filed for divorce on August 15, 1972. After a default divorce, Priscilla sued Elvis for fraud to reopen the divorce on May 30, 1973. The second divorce was finalized on October 9, 1973, agreeing to share custody of their daughter and a modified property settlement in which Presley paid her nearly $1,5 million. When Priscilla left him for her karate teacher Mike Stone, the singer's "ego was damaged beyond repair. ... Considering Presley's status as a universal sex symbol ... it is unlikely he was able to put this situation in any type of perspective other than having not been 'man enough' to hold his woman." According to Billy Stanley, he "wasn't the same person" as before. Priscilla says that she confronted Elvis about the divorce. According to her account, he forced himself upon her; "'This is how a real man makes love to a woman,' he said." However, Priscilla in an interview stated that she regretted her choice of words in describing the incident, and said it had been an overstatement, later clarifying that "Elvis made love to me forcefully, not forcibly."

Freudian and other sexual psychologists say that Presley is a "classic example of the mother/Madonna/whore split". He "adored his mother and never recovered from her early death." He met Priscilla "when she was 14. She became a mother at 22. It is said that Presley never had sex with her again after the birth of his daughter, and would never have sex with a woman who had had a baby. He did not remarry after his divorce from Priscilla and did not have any more children." However, Priscilla Presley states in her autobiography that they did have sex again after the birth of their daughter, and actress Barbara Leigh, who had a relationship with the singer after the birth of her own child, claimed that they had sex often, despite Presley's being aware of her child. Both accounts contradict claims made that Presley would not have sex with a woman who had a child. These psychologists also ignore that Presley died only three years after his finalized divorce and was going to marry his fiancee on Christmas 1977.

== Linda Thompson and Ginger Alden ==
Presley went out with Linda Thompson from 1972 to 1976. In November 1976, Ginger Alden became his latest and last serious relationship with a woman and was his fiancée before Presley’s death. She was the person who found his unresponsive body when he died. Presley had given Ginger Alden a diamond engagement ring and presumably planned to marry her.

== The Memphis Mafia and other male friends ==
Apart from his relationships with women, Presley had many male friends. He reportedly spent day and night with friends and employees whom the news media affectionately dubbed the Memphis Mafia. Among them were Joe Esposito, Sonny West, Red West, Billy Smith, Marty Lacker and Lamar Fike. Gerald Marzorati says that Presley "couldn't go anywhere else without a phalanx of boyhood friends." Even the women he dated deplored them, saying, "Whenever you were with Elvis for the most part you were with his entourage. Those guys were always around..."

According to Peter Guralnick, for Presley and the guys "Hollywood was just an open invitation to party all night long. Sometimes they would hang out with Sammy Davis Jr., or check out Bobby Darin at the Cloister. Nick Adams and his gang came by the suite all the time, not to mention the eccentric actor Billy Murphy ..." When Buzz Cason asked Lamar Fike "how Elvis did it – this partying nearly every night," he "answered, 'A little somethin' to get down and a little something to get up.' Obviously, he was referring to the pills that started a trend that in only a few years would lead to Presley's death."

According to Presley expert Elaine Dundy, "Of all Elvis' new friends, Nick Adams, by background and temperament the most insecure, was also his closest." Guralnick says that the singer "was hanging out more and more with Nick and his friends" and that Presley was glad Colonel Tom Parker "liked Nick." June Wilkinson also confirms that the singer "had an entourage who spoke with Southern accents. The only one I remember was Nick Adams, the actor." In her recent Presley biography, Kathleen Tracy writes that Adams was Presley's regular friend and often met the singer backstage or at Graceland. "He and Elvis would go motorcycle riding late at night and stay up until all hours talking about the pain of celebrity."

Boxing legend Muhammad Ali, who first met Presley in 1973 and who even wore a "People's Choice" robe Presley gave him before two boxing bouts in 1973, also acknowledged his friendship with Presley.
