= Memphis Mafia =

Entourage of Elvis Presley

The Memphis Mafia was the nickname given in the 1960s by the media to the group of Elvis Presley's friends, associates, employees and cousins whose main functions were to accompany, protect, and serve Presley. From the beginning of his career in 1954 until his death in 1977, several members filled practical roles; for instance, they were employed to work for Presley as bodyguards or on tour logistics and scheduling. In these cases Presley paid salaries, but most lived off fringe benefits such as gifts, cars, houses and bonuses. Over the years, the number of members grew and changed, but for the most part there was a core group who spent much time with Presley.

== Early members ==
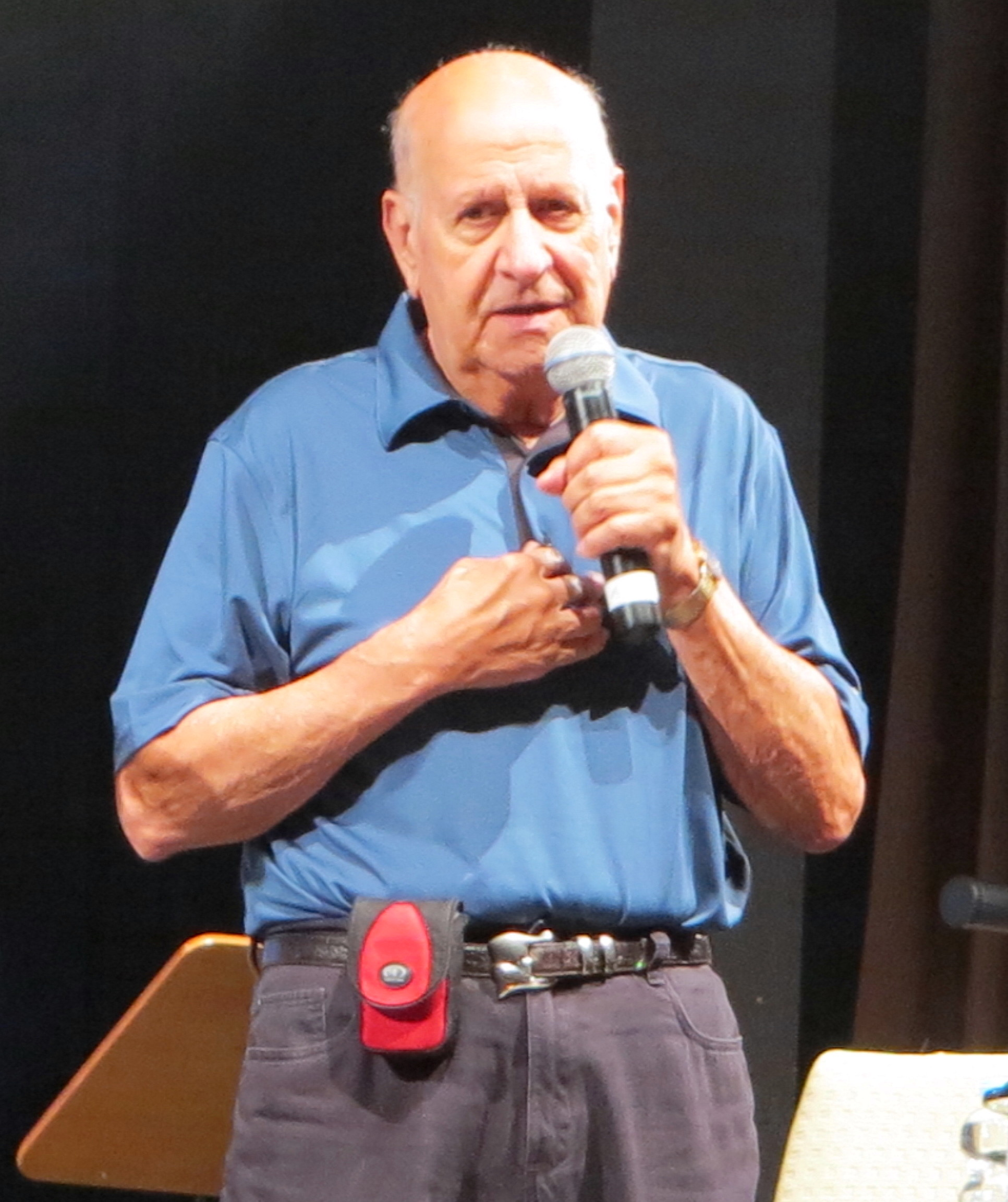
Esposito in 2013

Elvis preferred men around him who were loyal, trustworthy and deferential. Thus family members and friends of his youth were very important to him. "For the first time in his life, he had a group of male friends to pal around with, and he relished being the leader of the pack." The group began with Elvis' first cousins Junior and Gene Smith, who accompanied Elvis everywhere, along with Elvis' high school friend Red West, and rockabilly singer Cliff Gleaves. At that time Judy Spreckels seems to have been the only woman. She describes herself as having been like a sister to Elvis, a companion, confidante and keeper of secrets in the exciting days of his early career. "Elvis was surrounded by the first wave of what would become known as the Memphis Mafia." She says that she "was with him and the guys all the time." They drove bumper cars in Las Vegas Valley, rode horses in California and hung out at Graceland. "There wasn't a crowd then, just a few guys," and she emphasizes that she "had nothing to do with being a yes man for him and obviously he trusted me."

Among them were cousins Red West and Sonny West, as well as Billy Smith, Charlie Hodge, Joe Esposito, Lamar Fike, Alan Fortas, Richard Davis, Marty Lacker, Jimmy Kingsley, "Chief" Ray Sitton, Jerry Schilling, Mike Keeton, Dave Hebler, Sam Thompson and numerous others.

== Origin of the nickname ==
Around the mid '60s, the media dubbed these people the "Memphis Mafia". This first referred to their image, as they usually cruised the city in black mohair suits and dark sunglasses. According to one account, a crowd of people in front of the Riviera Hotel watched as two big black limousines arrived. Elvis and his friends got out of the two cars and someone in the crowd yelled, "Who are they, the Mafia?" and a newspaper reporter picked up the story. The Memphis Mafia members themselves say on their website that Elvis liked the name and it stuck. These original Memphis Mafia members at the time the phrase was coined were cousins Sonny West, and Red West, as well as Billy Smith, and Charlie Hodge, among others.

== The initials TCB ==
Around 1970, Presley and his friends and employees adopted the acronym TCB which stood for "Taking Care of Business". Presley had the tail of his private jet painted with a lightning bolt and the initials "TCB", and he gave away gold and diamond chain necklaces with TCB logos as gifts. Women working in his entourage were given TLC jewelry for "Tender Loving Care". He commissioned the TCB jewelry in 1971 as a gift for the men working for him. Elvis' wife Priscilla helped with the creation of this logo on a flight through stormy conditions. A lightning bolt flashed across the sky in front of them, and Elvis took inspiration from it. Priscilla sketched out the design on note paper, positioning the letters and lightning bolt in various ways before they found what they liked.

== Opinions by different people ==
Rolling Stone journalist William Otterburn-Hall describes the men as close around the star "like a football scrum after a loose ball". He relates that they were a "friendly bunch" who, when Elvis began to sing just for fun during his interview, followed "suit, singing, clowning, all on their feet". According to Patrick Humphries, they "acted as Elvis' bodyguards, babysitters, drug procurers, girl-getters, mates and car buyers." The author also mentions other functions of the guys: "various members of the Memphis Mafia had ... played vital roles in keeping Elvis' numerous dirty secrets out of the public eye. A couple of them had been arrested with false prescriptions attempting to collect drugs for Elvis, quite a few had taken physical hits in the service of protecting Elvis and none were paid more than $500 a week. For that they were often shouted at, abused and belittled by the King when he felt like it." Marty Lacker states, "Everyone had assigned responsibilities and they were far from leeches, hangers on or whatever else they were called." "They all had jobs to do so that Elvis could do his and as far as being there for the money, that's laughable because there really wasn't much in that area to be there for." Marty went on to say, "Most of us were not there for the money, we were there because we all cared about Elvis and each other like brothers."

== Party life ==
Peter Guralnick writes that Elvis spent all day and night with the members from the Memphis Mafia: "For Elvis and the guys ... Hollywood was just an open invitation to party all night long. Sometimes they would hang out with Sammy Davis Jr., or check out Bobby Darin at the Cloister. Nick Adams and his gang came by the suite all the time, not to mention the eccentric actor Billy Murphy, longtime friend of John Wayne and Robert Mitchum". Guralnick adds "The Colonel joked that they looked like a bunch of old men, but the Memphis Mafia had become almost as well known around town as Frank Sinatra's Rat Pack" and that Elvis and his guys were all "living on speed and tranqs". For Joe Esposito, "it was a party like you wouldn't believe. Go to a different show every night, then pick up a bunch of women afterwards, go party the next night. Go to the lounges, see Fats Domino, Della Reese, Jackie Wilson, the Four Aces, the Dominoes – all the old acts. We'd stay there and never sleep, we were all taking pills just so we could keep up with each other."

== Bodyguards, road managers and other employees ==
When Presley emerged as a major celebrity in 1956, he was constantly besieged by adoring fans and the press, making a normal lifestyle impossible. However, Presley's enormous wealth allowed him an ability to separate himself from the general public, especially in his home city of Memphis. For example, he would rent an entire movie theater to watch a film. Among Memphis natives, he was most known for renting out the entire Memphis amusement park Libertyland in order to ride his favorite roller coaster, the Zippin Pippin. Professional handlers and celebrity security experts had not yet evolved. Presley faced repeated threats of physical violence from outraged moral extremists and death threats from fanatics, as would later happen when he performed in Las Vegas. These threats were kept out of the press for fear of triggering even more.

For both his security needs and touring support, Presley hired people chosen from among those he could trust and depend on to manage his public appearances. This entourage included first cousins and several of Presley's friends from his boyhood in a poor Memphis housing project plus junior and senior high school friends and early employees from Memphis such as Alan Fortas, nephew of U.S. Supreme Court Justice Abe Fortas. Many people were employed with the group through the years but some of the more prominent members were Joe Esposito, Lamar Fike, Alan Fortas, George Klein, Marty Lacker, Billy Smith, Richard Davis, Red West, Sonny West, Dave Hebler, Al Strada, Dr. Nick, Larry Geller, Charlie Hodge, Jerry Schilling, Sam Thompson and Gene Smith.

Each man had specific duties. Joe Esposito served as Presley's chief road manager and personal aide for 17 years, handling money and extensive travel arrangements. Charlie Hodge harmonized with Elvis, played background acoustic guitar, and gave him scarves and beverages during concerts, as well as being responsible for inspecting each stage layout before the concert. Lamar Fike handled Elvis' stage lighting. Red and Sonny West were Elvis' bodyguards and security at Presley concerts.(although Red West also had a talent for writing songs, including some recorded by Elvis such as "If Everyday Was Like Christmas" and then "Separate Ways"). Marty Lacker was a brutally honest "sounding board" advisor

Jerry Schilling gave advice about what other groups were using for audio equipment etc., and Billy Smith was a "Jack of All Trades".

Esposito and Lacker were Presley's best men at his wedding. Red West was one of Presley's earliest friends from their school days, his first bodyguard, and in 1954 had acted as a driver for Presley, Scotty Moore, and Bill Black when they first toured the American South performing as the "Blue Moon Boys." Priscilla Presley said these employees were paid an average of $250 per week during the 1960s, which rose to $425 per week in the 1970s, however one pay stub does exist that showed a weekly pay of only $35 for the '63-65 era. Each Christmas all Presley employees received bonus checks. Some members of this inner circle became close friends who served as replacements for the normal everyday friendships Presley's fame would not allow. Known for his generosity (attributed by Presley himself to an impoverished childhood), he bought some of these employees homes as wedding gifts and frequently bought new Cadillac automobiles for employees, relatives and friends.

== Relationship with Elvis ==
=== "Presence of the Entourage" ===
Elvis' father Vernon increasingly distrusted and disliked many members of the Memphis Mafia as Elvis' financial condition deteriorated in 1972. Presley's rapid financial deterioration was partly a result of his divorce from Priscilla, which was finalized on October 9, 1973, as well as Colonel Tom Parker's exorbitant percentage of Presley's earnings.

The most publicized fallout came when Vernon Presley fired Elvis' longtime friends Red West and Sonny West on July 13, 1976.

Elvis' expenses were increasing at an alarming rate, and there were complaints and threats of lawsuits about the manner in which the Wests interacted with fans. After being in Elvis' employment, both Red and Sonny were paid a few weeks' severance pay. Their requests to speak directly to Elvis about their employment termination and the nominal severance pay were not granted. Red West, Sonny West, and Elvis himself felt betrayed, and all parties were reportedly upset over the firings. The Wests and Dave Hebler (who was the third bodyguard also fired at that time) publicly asked for $1 million for whoever who would agree to publish their tell-all book.

When Parker informed Elvis that the Wests were writing a "tell-all book" about Elvis, which included the disclosure of Elvis' addiction to prescribed pain medications, he was furious as well as "hurt". Elvis and Parker discussed offering the Wests a monetary settlement in return for a written agreement the book would not be published, and their experiences with Elvis, on stage and off would remain confidential.

An agreement was not reached, and when Elvis received a copy of the book entitled Elvis: What Happened? (which was first published on July 12, 1977), he worried that his reputation would be adversely affected. Most of all, Elvis was concerned his daughter Lisa Marie as well as Vernon, would be adversely affected by the contents of the book. The publication of the book bothered Elvis on a personal and professional level during the last months of his life. His last phone call with Red West was published in the press in October 1976. Despite his concern, Elvis still found the strength to joke about the situation, telling his entourage that two of his former friends had become reporters.

In numerous press conferences concerning Elvis: What Happened?, both of the West cousins stated they wrote the book in part to make Elvis realize that his dependence on prescription medications was (literally) killing him. They stated they hoped their book would "shock" Elvis into seeking medical care away from the physicians who were complicit in prescribing Elvis large amounts of prescription medications and fully resting and becoming "clean" off of these prescribed drugs. They contradicted themselves by going on talking about Elvis personal issues after his death. Sonny West admitted to Jerry Schilling that he wrote the book to make some money.

=== Brotherhood ===
Elvis Presley reportedly spent days and nights with his friends and employees from the Memphis Mafia. They were a big family and Elvis lived in a "milieu of a protective brotherhood." Gerald Marzorati says that Elvis "couldn't go anywhere else without a phalanx of boyhood friends." Even the girls he dated lamented, "Whenever you were with Elvis for the most part you were with his entourage. Those guys were always around". According to Presley's cousin Billy Smith, Elvis got into bed with Smith and his wife Jo "many times at Graceland when we would spend the night there in Lisa's room, or on tour in the hotel, and at the trailer on the property at Graceland. ... we were all three there talking for hours about everything in the world! Sometimes he would have a bad dream and come looking for me to talk to, and he would actually fall asleep in our bed with us. That happened a lot of times, and we thought nothing of it."

=== Playing dangerous games ===
When they rented the Rainbow Rollerdrome in Memphis, Elvis and the "Memphis Mafia" usually played "a game called 'War', of which Elvis was the proud inventor. There were two teams, and the object of the game was to knock over as many members of the opposing team as possible by any means." Another game was called the 'Whip' game. "Elvis's idea of an exciting game was that it should be as dangerous as possible", such as the game that involved fireworks. "Some of the Memphis Mafia would buy up to $15,000 worth of fireworks in today's money, including skyrockets, baby giants, firecrackers, and chasers, which moved rapidly and unpredictably until they exploded. Since the emphasis was on large and potentially lethal fireworks, everyone had to wear air force jump-suits plus gloves, helmets, and goggles. When they were all dressed up, they divided themselves into Blue and Red teams, and started hurling fireworks at the other team; Elvis was left with a big scar on his neck from one firework, and one of his friends nearly lost an eye."

== Books by former "Memphis Mafia" members ==
Since the late 1970s, some former members of the Memphis Mafia have written books on Elvis. The first exposé book, Elvis: What Happened?, appeared in 1977 shortly before Elvis's death. This so-called Bodyguard book came from the West cousins and Dave Hebler, fired by Presley's father. They wrote about Presley's years of prescription drug abuse which eventually led to his death. Elvis had "even offered the publishers money not to go ahead with it. For Vernon the book was proof of his long-held distrust and dislike not just of those three but of the whole of the Memphis Mafia..." Even George Klein, who chastised and shunned other members of the group for writing books about Elvis, ended up writing a book as well. In 2007, Sonny West released Elvis: Still Takin' Care of Business, which was a softer look at his relationship with Presley.

=== List of books ===
- Elvis: What Happened by Red West, Sonny West, and Dave Hebler as told to Steve Dunleavy (1977) Bantam Books (ISBN 0345272153)
- Elvis: Portrait of a Friend by Marty Lacker, Patsy Lacker and Leslie S. Smith (1980) (ISBN 0553138243)
- Me' n Elvis by Charlie Hodge (1988) Castle Books, (ISBN 0-91669300-7)
- Elvis, From Memphis To Hollywood by Alan Fortas (1992) Popular Culture, Ink., (ISBN 1-56075-026-X)
- Good Rockin' Tonight : Twenty Years On The Road And On The Town With Elvis by Diamond Joe Esposito,(1994) Simon & Schuster (ISBN 0-671-79507-4)
- Elvis' Man Friday by Gene Smith (1994) (ISBN 0-9642566-0-6)
- Elvis Aaron Presley: Revelations from the Memphis Mafia by Alanna Nash, Billy Smith (Contributor), Marty Lacker (Contributor), Lamar Fike (Contributor) – HarperCollins (1995) (ISBN 0060176199)
- Elvis: Still Taking Care of Business by Sonny West with Marshall Terrill Triumph Books (ISBN 978-1-57243-939-9)
- Me and a Guy Named Elvis: My Lifelong Friendship with Elvis Presley by Jerry Schilling, Chuck Crisafulli (August 17, 2006) Gotham Books (ISBN 1-59240-231-3)
- Remember Elvis Produced by Diamond Joe Esposito and Daniel Lombardy, (2006) TCBJOE Publishing (ISBN 0977894525)
