= Judy Spreckels =

American writer (1931–2015)

Judy Spreckels (born Judith Powell, December 9, 1931 – December 15, 2015) was an American writer, publisher and trial historian. She married sugar heir Adolph B. Spreckels Jr., and was a friend of Elvis Presley during the rock 'n' roll singer's rise to stardom.

== Spreckels' relationship with Elvis Presley ==
Like Elvis, Spreckels describes herself as having been like a sister to Presley when he was about 21 and she was three years older. According to her own account, she was "a companion, confidante and keeper of secrets in the exciting days of his early career". At that time, "Elvis was surrounded by the first wave of what would become known as the Memphis Mafia." She says that she "was with him and the guys all the time." They drove bumper cars in Las Vegas, rode horses in California and hung out at Graceland. "There wasn't a crowd then, just a few guys," and she emphasizes that she "had nothing to do with being a yes man for him and obviously he trusted me." She also claims that Presley told her secrets "that I never told and will never tell." In 1956, the singer sat for a portrait she drew. He inscribed it, "To Judy Spreckels, I love you, baby. Elvis Presley".

On June 11, 1956, Time magazine ironically reported:

Scampering aboard a plane in Los Angeles, impulsive Judy Spreckels, 24, ex-wife of Sugar Daddy Adolph B. Spreckels Jr., was soon in Memphis and the offices of the daily Press-Scimitar. She had learned that a photograph, made last month in Las Vegas, showing her with dreamboat Groaner Elvis Presley, 21, had appeared in the newspaper, and she had hopped to Tennessee to buy some copies of that edition. Was she in love with Presley (TIME, May 14) ? "Oh, no, he's too young," cooed Judy.

On May 28, 1956 The Memphis Press-Scimitar was more complete : Spreckels added "Just call me an admirer. I think he's the greatest".

When Presley and Spreckels visited Graceland, she said, "We stayed up all night listening to Elvis singing and playing the piano. He liked to sing hymns. ... He introduced me to Amazing Grace."

In March 1958, when Elvis left home for the Army, Spreckels was among the friends who were in Memphis, such as Anita Wood, Patsy Presley and Mrs Travis Smith.

She also went to the funeral of his mother Gladys in August 1958, saying "I have never seen anyone as sad as Elvis was ... He grieved. He cried continuously. We were in the front hall at Graceland, and he stood there hugging me for a half-hour. He was crying and crying and crying. It was the saddest thing I'd ever seen." In a letter of August 25, 1958, Presley's manager Colonel Tom Parker confirms that Spreckels came "to Memphis to be with Elvis for the Funeral [,] this was very kind of her also. And I know Elvis did appreciate this so very much."

In 1956, during Presley's first engagement in Las Vegas, visitors to the shows included Spreckels, Hal Wallis (who had just signed Elvis to his first movie deal) and entertainers Ray Bolger, Phil Silvers and Liberace. In later years, Spreckels still attended Presley's Las Vegas concerts, and he would stop the show to introduce her to the audience. She had married by then and so had he. Her second husband was B.E. Blackwell, a polo player heir to a cannery fortune.

On September 2, 1974 Elvis introduced Spreckels and explained their story to the audience during his Vegas midnight show : ”... She gave me a four-star black sapphire ring that I kept until Priscilla and I were married. And Priscilla wore it as an engagement ring. This lady here did it, twenty years ago… She’s been married, in the hills, flying jets, riding horses and all that kind of stuff, She’s a wild woman, but she did that and she comes by every once in a while to check on me…”

== Writer, publisher and trial historian ==
For a while Spreckels ran a small publishing company and edited Horses magazine in California. In 1966, she wrote an article about the late National Horse Show Jumper champion, Ben O'Meara. She also worked as a ghostwriter of books.

Spreckels, whose equestrian interests started young, published Horses magazine from 1961 to cover horse shows all over the USA; she was also the president of a company called Horses Inc.

As a trial historian, Spreckels has "been attending Los Angeles-area trials off and on for forty-six years."

More interested in the procedure than personalities, she never discussed the outcome; she liked the courtroom atmosphere and was interested in the point of law as well as in the brilliant way some lies were repeated often enough to become believable.

In the 90's Spreckels became the Menendez case’s unofficial historian, compiling news clippings in two indexed binders that had come to be known around the courthouse as “the bibles” used by reporters as reference material. She followed the O.J. Simpson'trial and was the trial historian for the collective book written about the trial's impact on the jury's lives.

== Equestrian ==
Spreckels began riding aged two. She first appeared in horse shows at the age of 6. She won cups and ribbons with her own stable of hunters and jumpers.

In 1953, when she was chosen "Girl of the Golden West" harness race meeting at Hollywood park, she had the opportunity to train and drive a $10,000 Damon Runyon Fund hackney pony.

During her marriage years to a wealthy rancher she became a painter of horse pictures.

The saddle Elvis had made for Spreckels as a thank you gift is exhibited at the Memphis Mansion in Randers Denmark.

== Horse ranch ==
In 1978, Spreckels sold horses and spent the next two years resting at her horse ranch in Las Vegas and at home in Beverly Hills. Soon after, this ranch was sold.

At the time of her death, Spreckels lived in the San Fernando Valley.

== Last wife of Adolph Spreckels II ==
On January 31, 1954, Judith Powell became the 6th and last wife of Adolph Spreckels II, they knew each other since 10 years. Adolph Spreckels II was the grandson of Claus Spreckels, the son of Adolph Spreckels and Alma de Bretteville Spreckels.

On March 12, 1954 Judy settled the divorce for $14,000 including cash, a mink coat and a diamond ring.

The former spouses, however, were seen together spending evening at clubs after their divorce. When they were spotted taking the same flight to Mexico by pure coincidence, Adolph Spreckels II told the press, who were asking if there could be a reconciliation, that anything is possible in life.

In 1961, Adolph Spreckels II died of a brain hemorrhage caused by a fall.
