= Elvis: What Happened? =

Memoir by Steve Dunleavy

- Author: Steve Dunleavy
- Language: English
- Publisher: Ballantine Books
- Publication date: May 1977 (UK); July 1977 (USA)
- Publication place: United States
- Media type: Print (paperback)
- Pages: 332 pp
- ISBN: 0-3452-7215-3

Elvis: What Happened? is a 1977 sensationalist book about the American singer Elvis Presley. The book, which is based on the personal accounts of three of Elvis' former bodyguards, went into detail on Presley's prescription drug addiction. His death, only two weeks after the book's US publication in July 1977 (its publication in UK was May 77), made it highly topical and helped boost its sales to over three million.

The bodyguards – Red West, his cousin Sonny West, and David Hebler – had been fired purportedly for cost-saving reasons. After first vainly approaching Rick Husky and Frank Lieberman, they were finally helped by a Rupert Murdoch reporter Steve Dunleavy to produce the book which they claimed to be a friendly warning, rather than a money-making exercise.

== Background ==
In July 1976, Red and Sonny West, together with Dave Hebler, were fired by Elvis Presley's father, Vernon, from their jobs as bodyguards to Presley. Red had known Presley since they had attended high school together and had become a very close friend. He became a part of Presley's inner circle in 1955, acting as a driver and bodyguard. Sonny, Red's cousin, had first met Presley in early 1958 and began working for him in 1960 after Presley returned to the spotlight following his two-year stint in the United States Army. Hebler, who had first met Presley in 1972, was later hired as a member of the security team.

Reasons for their dismissal differ, depending on who is asked about the situation. Presley and his father claimed that it was a money-saving move designed to cut the wages being paid out; while others, including members of Presley's inner circle, thought it was because the three men were the only ones who would stand up to Presley about his drug dependency. A third theory is that their security techniques had led to several injuries amongst fans and lawsuits brought against Presley, a practice that he could no longer risk. It was not uncommon for Presley to fire members of his inner circle from time to time, hiring them back again some time later once the situation had cooled down. It was initially thought by the three men and other friends of Presley that this was what he had intended to do with the Wests and Hebler, but they had started work on the book before anything could be sorted out. Moreover, Vernon was well known to have a strong dislike for most of, if not all, the members of his son's entourage, and several members of the inner circle believed that he would have blocked any efforts his son might have made to reinstate any of them.

== The book ==
Following their firing, the three men decided to write a tell-all book about the life of Presley. According to their own accounts, the reasons for writing the book were not for financial gain or revenge, but as an intervention tactic—"to get him to face up to reality and do something about his destructive lifestyle before it was too late". Steve Dunleavy, then a gossip columnist with the National Star and later a correspondent for the nationally syndicated program A Current Affair, was approached to help with its writing and publication. When Presley first heard about the book, he was furious. He hoped that they would "see sense", or that his manager, Colonel Tom Parker, would be able to stop its publication.

The book tells the story of Presley's personal life as seen through the eyes of Red, Sonny, and Hebler. It tells of incidents relating to his sex life, drug use, musical career, and his relationship with each of the three men. Names of people written about in the book, for the most part, are changed to respect their privacy, although this has led some to believe that a lack of named sources suggests these people and incidents never really existed. However, according to Alan Hanson, "The drug-related death of Presley gave Elvis: What Happened? almost instant credibility. The book’s very title seemed to echo the question all of America was asking. And, as a steady flow of Presley confidants began speaking out in the succeeding years, some (but not all) of the allegations first mentioned in the book have been confirmed." Jerry Schilling, one of the best friends of Elvis said about the book "Elvis' home is the only private place he has, and what goes on there should remain private".

== Release ==
Originally serialized in the UK in May 1977, the book was officially released in the United States in July 1977, published by Ballantine books. Although the book was moderately successful upon release, most loyal followers of Presley did not buy the book until after his death. Following the death of Presley on August 16, 1977, just two weeks after the publication of the book, the stories about his drug use and personal life became more publicized and were suddenly even more of interest to fans and of those seeking answers about how Presley could have died so young and suddenly. This interest led to the book selling in excess of three million copies, making it one of the most successful Presley books. One review called the book a "332-page thing that's about 300 and some pages too long". Elvis' own feelings about the book were that he believed his fans were wise enough to see through what he felt were lies.

== Reception ==
The Elvis History Blog website described the book as only partially true. Despite having some historical value, the book also "was a volume totally without attribution and containing many errors in fact. There was not a single footnote in the text, and it contained not a single word from anyone else, either inside or outside the Presley inner circle, to support the authors’ many allegations against Elvis." The website also states that while many of the book's claims about Presley were true, some of the claims were in fact "lies fueled in part by the resentment" the three authors had towards Presley after he dismissed them as his bodyguards.
