= Sonny West (actor) =

American actor

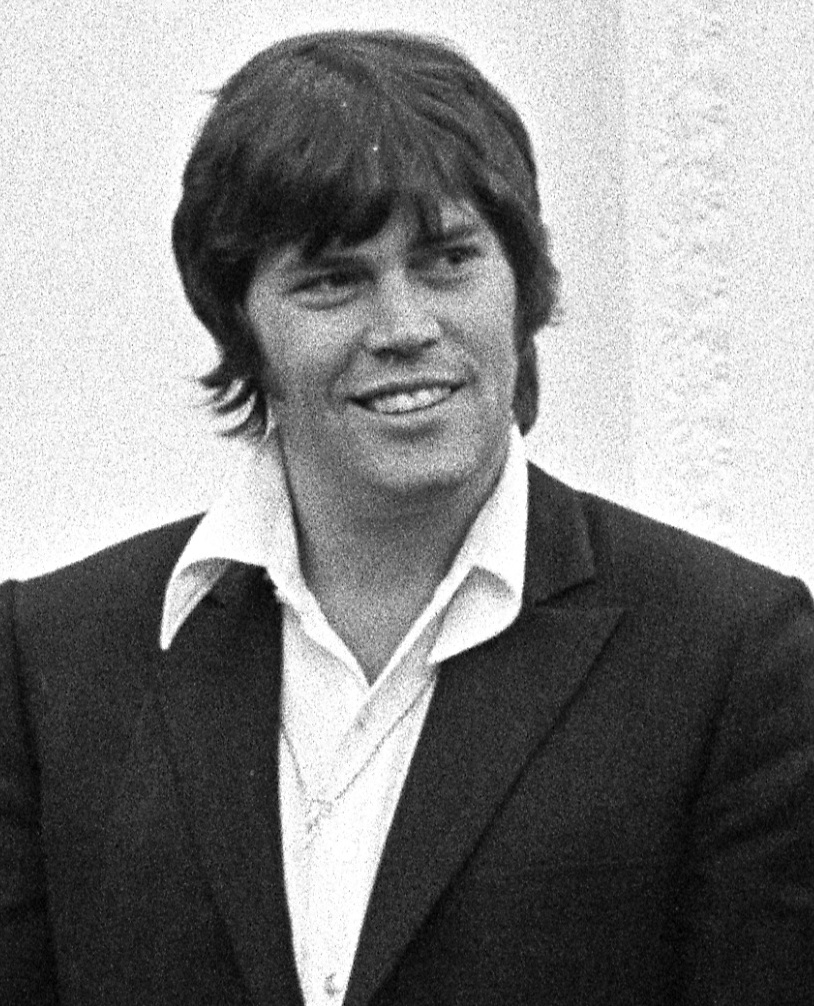
- Sonny West at the White House, December 1970
- Born: Delbert Bryant West Jr. July 5, 1938; Memphis, Tennessee, U.S.
- Died: May 24, 2017 (aged 78); Hendersonville, Tennessee, U.S.
- Resting place: Crestview Memory Gardens, Gallatin, Tennessee, U.S.
- Occupations: Bodyguard; actor
- Years active: 1962–2007
- Known for: bodyguard of Elvis Presley
- Spouse: Judy Jordan (m. 1970)
- Children: 2
- Relatives: Red West (cousin)

Delbert Bryant "Sonny" West, Jr. (July 5, 1938 – May 24, 2017) was an American actor and bodyguard of the singer Elvis Presley along with his cousin Red West for sixteen years, as part of the Elvis entourage at Elvis' Memphis home Graceland, which became known as "The Memphis Mafia".

His parents came from Pontotoc, Mississippi, not far from Tupelo, Elvis Presley's hometown. West was one of two sons and five daughters. Both West and Elvis grew up in different lower income projects in Memphis, Tennessee and, although living near to one another, never actually met in childhood. Before and after Elvis' passing, West wrote several books, and made public appearances at Elvis related conventions and gatherings, speaking out about his time working for Presley and their relationship.

== Working with Elvis ==
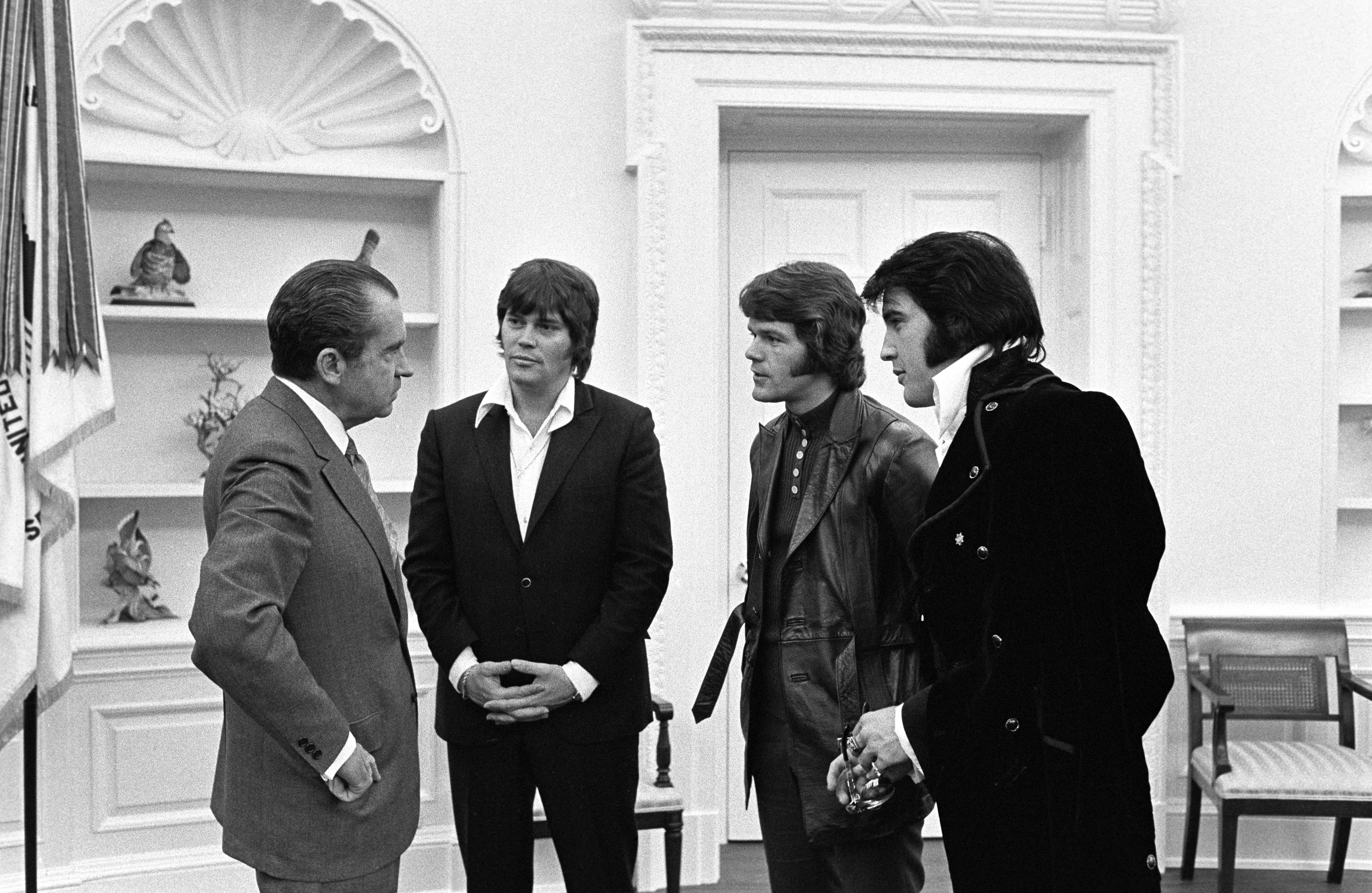
West and Presley with President Richard Nixon and Jerry Schilling at the White House on December 21, 1970

West's cousin, Red West, worked for Elvis as a companion, driver and bodyguard from 1955 onwards. West met Elvis in 1958 at a roller skating rink. After discharge from the U.S. Air Force as an Airman Third Class (E-2), West, working as a washer and dryer repairman, went to work for Elvis as a bodyguard from 1960 to 1976, without being full time by Elvis' side such as during the '68 special.

In December 1970, West married his wife Judy Jordan, an actress and an original "Away We Go" girl from The Jackie Gleason Show, with Elvis as best man, and Priscilla Presley, then wife of Elvis, serving as Matron of Honor.

In July 1976, Presley bodyguards Sonny West, Red West, and David Hebler were fired by Elvis' father, Vernon Presley, in what was described as a cost-cutting measure, but was rumored to have been caused by concern over Presley's increased intake and dependence on various prescription drugs, and lawsuits against Presley due to security techniques which caused injury to fans.

== Meeting with Richard Nixon ==
On December 21, 1970, Presley, West, and Elvis insider Jerry Schilling were photographed in the White House with Richard Nixon by Ollie Atkins.

== Elvis: What Happened? Tell all book ==
In July 1977, the bodyguards, led by West, called a press conference coinciding with the release of their tell all book with tabloid writer Steve Dunleavy entitled Elvis: What Happened? which they claimed to be more of a friendly plea to Elvis to change his drug dependent behavior, rather than a mere money making exercise. The book sold over three million copies. Presley died only two weeks after the publication of the memoir, contributing to public interest, and sales of the book. Film clips from the original press conference promoting the book still exist. The press conference took place in 1977, shortly after Presley died.

== As an actor ==
West appeared in several Elvis movies as an extra. During the time West spent in Hollywood with Elvis, West stuck close to the directors and various other members of the movie crews, and learned about the production end of movie making. In the 1960s, West had a few acting roles under his belt, along with stunt work. West appeared in the following productions, sometimes uncredited:

- 1962 - Kid Galahad
- 1966 - The Navy vs. the Night Monsters (Airplane Guard / Fireman)
- 1967 - Daniel Boone...TV Series
- 1967 - A Matter of Blood ... Brave #2 (uncredited)
- 1968 - The Hellcats (Snake)
- 1968 - Stay Away, Joe (Jackson He-Crow)
- 1970 - Bigfoot (Mike)
- 1978 - The Disc Jockey
- 1983 - E.S.P.

== As stuntman ==
- 1965 - Harum Scarum
- 1965 - Tickle Me
- 1968 - Live A Little, Love A Little

== Documentaries and other appearances ==
West appeared in two Elvis concert documentaries (listed below) while Elvis was alive, and as himself in many Elvis Presley documentaries after Elvis died, in some cases in archival footage. West also gave many print and film interviews to the press.

- 1970 - Elvis: That's The Way It Is
- 1972 - Elvis On Tour
- 1981 - This is Elvis
- 1999 - Mr. Rock & Roll: Colonel Tom Parker
- 1999 - E! True Hollywood Story: The Last Days of Elvis
- 1999 - Elvis: All The King's Men - Legend Lives On
- 2002 - The Definitive Elvis: Elvis and Priscilla
- 2002 - The Definitive Elvis: Elvis and the Colonel
- 2002 - The Definitive Elvis: The Hollywood Years - Part II
- 2005 - Elvis by the Presleys
- 2007 - Kingdom: Elvis in Vegas
- 2016 - Inside Edition (television hospital interview)

== Life after Elvis ==
West and his wife ran a company which bred Arabian horses. West later designed and made Western jewelry. In 1982, West served as “Chief of Security” for the “Salem Country Gold ‘82” country music tour. West hosted a local Memphis radio show on WMRO. In his later years, West produced and starred in a show called, “Memories of Elvis: An Evening with Sonny West”.

== Illness and death ==
In April 2012, West was diagnosed with stage 4 cancer of the tonsils, which was successfully treated, but later recurred. He later also suffered from lung cancer, heart trouble, and pneumonia. He was hospitalized in October 2016, and remained there until he died eight months later on May 24, 2017, two months shy of his 79th birthday.

In a hospital interview in late 2016, West told Inside Edition “I don’t want to leave my family behind, penniless, leave them with nothing. I just want to be back to where I can carry the love I need to carry.” Before his last diagnosis, he said, “I felt good, ambitious, going around the world doing (my Elvis tribute) shows, entertaining people, standing up for hours [with] all my energy and everything.”

Medical bills, both his own and due to his wife's breast cancer, forced West to sell off some of his Elvis memorabilia as partial payment, but he and his wife still faced foreclosure and eviction from their home in Hendersonville, Tennessee. His son founded a Gofundme page to try to help.

West was buried with full military honors in Crestview Memory Gardens in Gallatin, Tennessee. He was survived by his wife, Judy, his son Bryan, his daughter Alana, and his grandson Tristen.

Less than two months after Sonny's death, on July 18, 2017, his cousin Red West died at Baptist Hospital in Memphis, aged 81, after suffering an aortic aneurysm.

== Books by West ==
- 1977 - Elvis: What Happened? with Sonny West, Red West, and Dave Hebler, with Steve Dunleavy
- 2008 - Elvis: Still Taking Care of Business: Memories and Insights About Elvis Presley From His Friend and Bodyguard Sonny West, with Marshall Terrill
