= Joe Esposito (author) =

American writer (1938–2016)

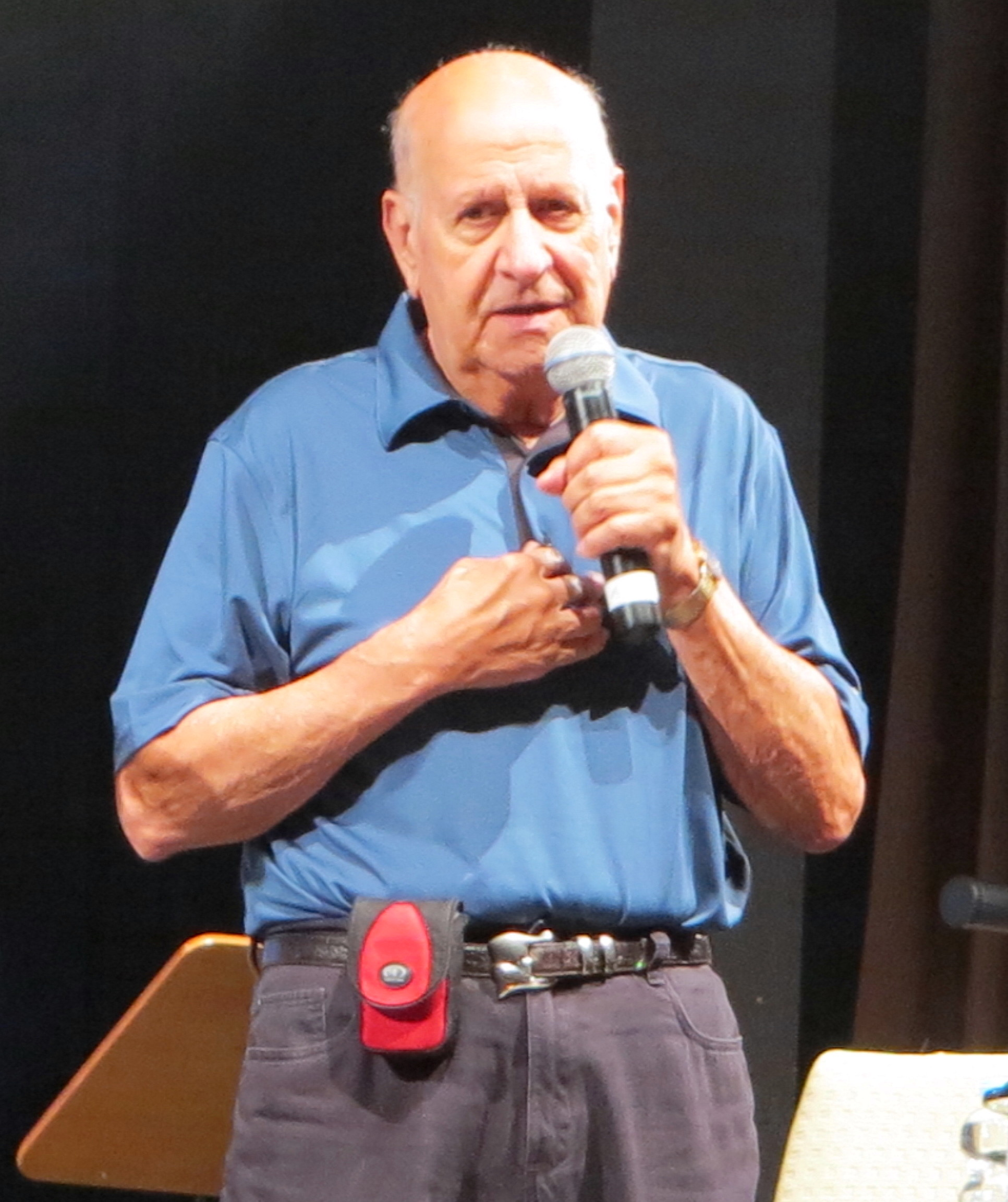
- Esposito in 2013
- Born: Joseph Carmine Esposito; January 22, 1938; Chicago, Illinois, US
- Died: November 23, 2016 (aged 78); Calabasas, California, US
- Spouses: Joan Kardashian; Martha Gallub
- Children: 3

Joseph Carmine Esposito (January 22, 1938 – November 23, 2016) was an American businessman and author known for his close association with singer-actor Elvis Presley. Esposito met Presley when both were serving in the US Army, and Esposito worked for Presley for many years until Presley's death in 1977. After Elvis's death, Esposito continued to collaborate with Jerry Weintraub, who produced Elvis's tours in the 1970s. Esposito also became an author and publisher of several Elvis books.

== Association with Elvis Presley ==
Esposito was best known for his association with Elvis Presley (see Memphis Mafia). He first met Presley while serving in the military in 1958 at an Army base in Friedberg, West Germany. They had both gone through basic training at Fort Hood, Texas, but did not meet face to face until a year later, when they were stationed in West Germany, where they quickly became lifelong friends. Esposito became Presley's right-hand man in 1960. In 1970, when Presley returned to touring, Esposito became his road manager. Esposito served as co-best man, with Marty Lacker, at Presley's wedding, while Esposito's wife, Joanie, served as the matron of honor and Priscilla’s sister, Michelle, was the maid of honor. After Presley's death, Esposito and Jerry Schilling served as consultants on the film This Is Elvis, and Colonel Parker was technical advisor.

Esposito was a consultant on multiple Elvis projects. He acted and provided voice narration in the 1981 documentary This Is Elvis. He was considered one of the most respected sources on Presley. His home movies appear in many productions, including the CBS Primetime Special Elvis By the Presleys.

== Personal life and death ==
Esposito had three children: daughters Debbie and Cindy with his first wife Joan, who later married into the Kardashian family; and son Anthony from his second marriage to Martha Gallub, who died on March 19, 2012, after a long fight with cancer. Esposito died November 23, 2016, after a year of declining health. His daughter said the cause was complications of dementia.

== Published books ==
- Elvis Intimate and Rare, by Diamond Joe Esposito, (1997) Darwin Lamm, Elvis International Forum books(ASIN B0006QR02Y)
- Remember Elvis Produced by Diamond Joe Esposito and Daniel Lombardy, (2006) TCBJOE Publishing (ISBN 0977894525)
- Elvis Straight Up, Produced by Diamond Joe Esposito and Joe Russo of The Soft Parade,(2007)Steamroller Publishing (097971320X)
- Celebrate Elvis - Volume 1, Produced by Diamond Joe Esposito and Daniel Lombardy, (2006) TCBJOE Publishing (ISBN 0977894533)
- Celebrate Elvis - Volume 2, Produced by Diamond Joe Esposito and Daniel Lombardy, (2007) TCBJOE Publishing (ISBN 097789455X)

"Good Rockin' Tonight - 20 years on the road with Elvis" by Joe Espositi and Elena Oumano, Simon & Schuster 1994 {ISBN 9781501158728}

== Interviews ==
- Larry King Interview with Joe Esposito
- www.rareelvispresley.com

== Movie appearances ==
- Kid Galahad (1962) - Bit Role (uncredited)
- It Happened at the World's Fair (1963) - Carnival Man (uncredited)
- Kissin' Cousins (1964) - Mike (uncredited)
- Viva Las Vegas (1964)
- Roustabout (1964)
- Spinout (1966) - Shorty's Pit Crew (uncredited)
- Clambake (1967) - Bit (uncredited)
- Stay Away, Joe (1968) - Man Who Takes Joe's Car Away (uncredited)
- Live a Little, Love a Little (1968) - Workman in Newspaper (uncredited)
- The Trouble with Girls (1969) - Gambler (uncredited)
- Elvis: That's the Way It Is (1970) - Himself (MGM Office Manager / Memphis Mafia / Friend)
- Elvis on Tour (1972) - Himself
- This is Elvis (1981) - Himself - Narration (voice)

== In popular culture ==
- He was portrayed by Joe Mantegna in 1979's Elvis: The Movie, alongside Kurt Russell.
- He was also portrayed by Ian Leson in the 2005 CBS mini-series Elvis, alongside Jonathan Rhys Meyers.
- He was spoofed by Chris Farley as the driver for "Tiny Elvis" on Saturday Night Live in 1992 hosted by Nicolas Cage.
- He was portrayed by Wayne Powers (with Dale Midkiff as Elvis) in the 1989 ABC Mini-Series, "Elvis and Me," which was based on the best-selling book by Priscilla Presley, who was also Executive Producer.
