= Jerry Schilling =

American talent manager (born 1942)

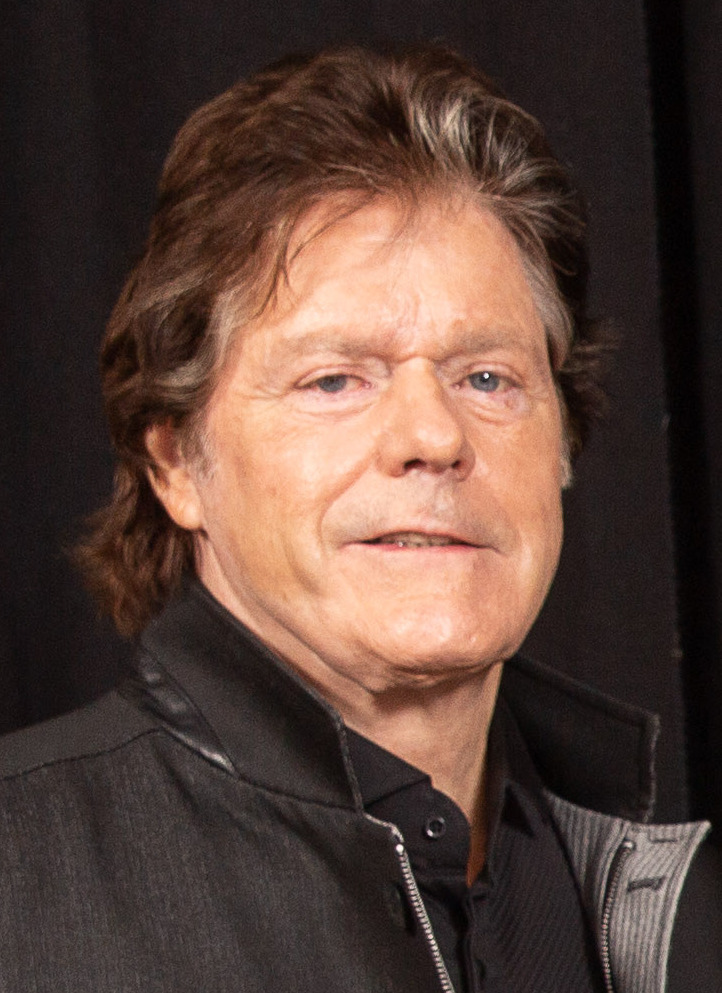
Schilling in 2019

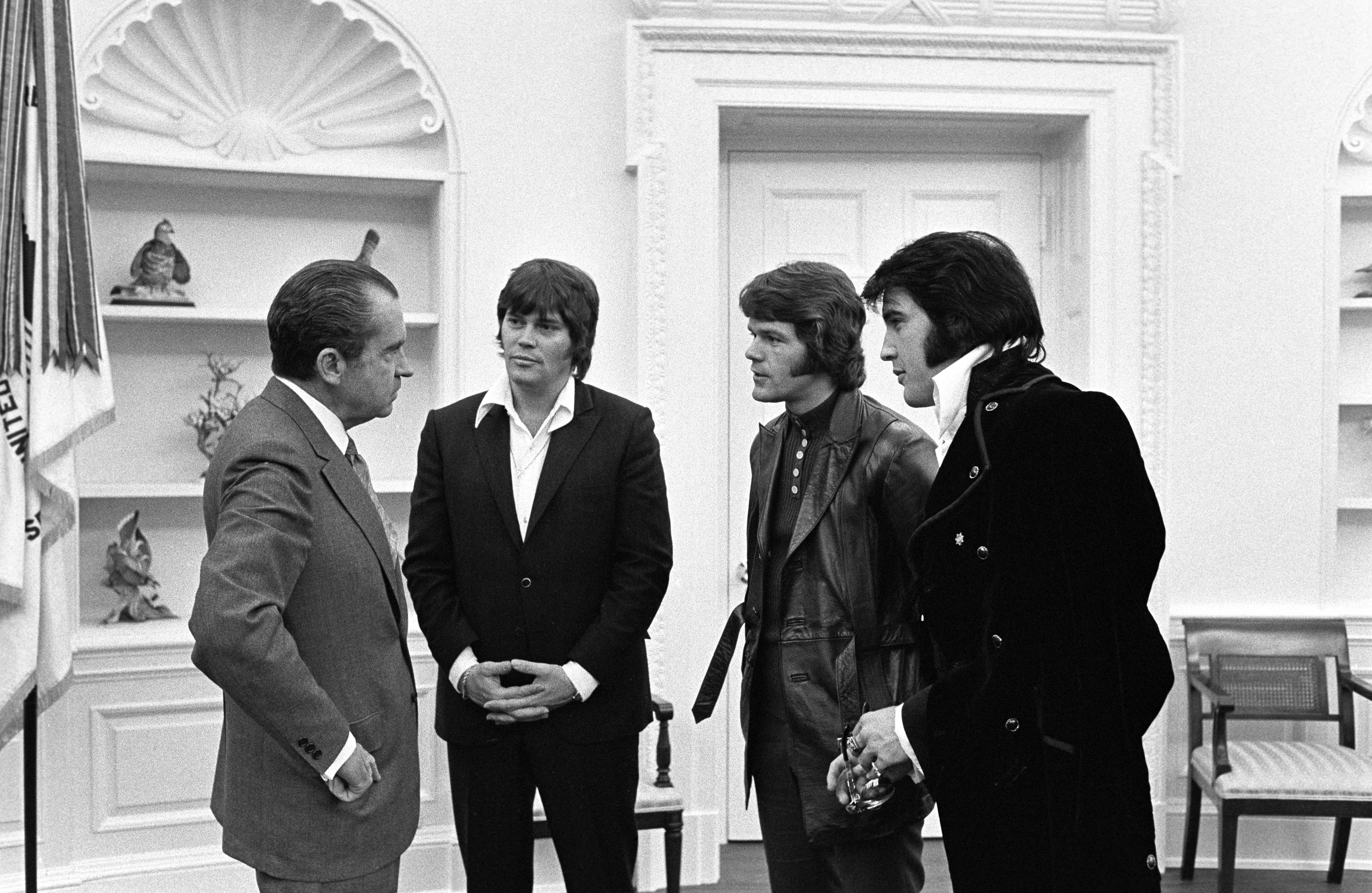
Schilling and Presley with President Richard Nixon and Sonny West at the White House in December 1970

Jerry Schilling (born February 6, 1942, in Memphis, Tennessee) is an American talent manager, who was associated with Elvis Presley and was a member of Presley's Memphis Mafia from the latter part of the 1960s. His other clients have included the Beach Boys, Jerry Lee Lewis and Lisa Marie Presley.
