= Steve Dunleavy =

Australian journalist (1938–2019)

- Born: Stephen Francis Patrick Aloysius Dunleavy; 21 January 1938; Sydney, New South Wales, Australia
- Died: 24 June 2019 (aged 81); Island Park, New York, United States
- Occupation: Journalist
- Years active: 1953–2008
- Spouses: Yvonne; Gloria (m. 1971–2019)

Stephen Francis Patrick Aloysius Dunleavy (21 January 1938 – 24 June 2019) was an Australian journalist based in the United States, best known as a reporter, columnist and editor for the New York Post from 1977 to 1986 and again from 1995 until his retirement in 2008. He was a lead reporter on the US tabloid television program A Current Affair in the 1980s and 1990s.

== Early life and career ==
Born at Bondi Beach in Sydney, Dunleavy began his career in the city during 1953, as a copy boy for the Sydney Sun, where his father worked as a photographer.

Later he moved to The Daily Mirror, an evening newspaper (also in Sydney) which then was owned by Ezra Norton. He subsequently worked in Hong Kong for The South China Morning Post, and freelanced in Japan, India, Greece, Italy, Spain and England.

After a period at United Press International in London, he arrived in New York City on New Year's Eve, 1966 with either $7 or $10 in his pocket.

== Career in the United States ==
Dunleavy worked in the New York bureau of Rupert Murdoch's Australian newspapers. As the news editor for Murdoch's supermarket tabloid Star, he received the John Birch Society's "American of the Year" award, although he never became an American citizen. He joined the New York Post as a news reporter in 1977, not long after Murdoch purchased the newspaper. Journalist William Shawcross, in his biography of Murdoch, wrote that Dunleavy was "a good-looking, hard-drinking, womanising, roustabout swashbuckler with an astounding gift for turning dross into lively cliché, drear facts into purpled prose." According to Steve Cuozzo, Dunleavy (falsely) claimed in the preparation of one story that AIDS could be transmitted by kissing. When challenged, he responded: "Let’s not be too technical, mate—it’s a good yarn." Dunleavy was named metropolitan editor in 1980 and held that position until 1986.

Dunleavy was persuaded by Murdoch to transfer to the new Fox network (also a Murdoch property) in 1986, and was involved in creating the United States tabloid television format in the 1980s. He became a regular reporter for A Current Affair (produced and aired by Fox Television Stations, and syndicated to non-Fox stations), and for the short-lived primetime newsmagazine The Reporters (which featured much of the same people and staff as ACA; unlike ACA, it aired as part of Fox's primetime lineup). ACA lasted from 1986 to 1995, after which Dunleavy returned to the New York Post as a columnist.

== Stories ==
=== Son of Sam ===
Dunleavy controversially disguised himself in scrubs to gain access to the hospital where Son of Sam victim Stacy Moskowitz was being treated and conducted an interview with her family.

=== DuMond controversy ===
Dunleavy wrote a series of articles in defence of Wayne DuMond, a Vietnam veteran who was convicted of rape in Arkansas in 1984, questioning the justice of DuMond's sentence and conviction. DuMond's sentence was eventually reduced to the point where he was paroled; within a year of his release, he went on to rape and murder two women in Missouri. This Willie Horton-like incident resurfaced as a political issue during the 2008 presidential election, since it was Republican candidate Mike Huckabee who secured DuMond's parole while governor of Arkansas; critics alleged that Huckabee became interested in the issue after reading Dunleavy's articles.

=== Beltway sniper controversy ===
In his column of 17 October 2002 regarding the Beltway sniper attacks, Dunleavy wrote, "If when the shooter is caught, if he is not a foreigner, I will bare my derriere in Macy’s window." One of the shooters, John Lee Malvo, was born in Jamaica and entered the United States illegally with his mother.

== Books ==
In 1977, in association with three of Elvis Presley's former bodyguards, Dunleavy published the paperback Elvis: What Happened? (ISBN 978-0345272157) which investigated Presley's life behind the scenes. It was published on 1 August, just two weeks before Presley's death on 16 August. This was the first book that focused on Presley's addiction to prescription drugs. Following Presley's death in August 1977, the book sold more than 1 million copies.

== Retirement ==
After a 55-year career, Dunleavy retired with a celebration on 1 October 2008 that was attended by 400 colleagues and friends. Those who honored Dunleavy included News Corp chairman and chief executive Rupert Murdoch, Post editor-in-chief Col Allan, NYPD commissioner Ray Kelly, Uniformed Firefighters Association president Steve Cassidy, and former A Current Affair host Maury Povich, who was accompanied by his wife, Connie Chung.

== Personal life ==
Dunleavy's first wife was Yvonne Dunleavy, a fellow Australian and the ghostwriter of The Happy Hooker.

He died at his home in Long Island, New York on June 24, 2019, at the age of 81. He was survived by his second wife, Gloria, whom he married in 1971, and their sons, Peter and Sean.

Dunleavy was described in his London Times obituary as "Rupert Murdoch’s No 1 éminence grise." He "was one of the greatest reporters of all time," Murdoch himself commented in tribute. "His passing is the end of a great era."

== Depiction ==
Dunleavy's personality was the model for actor Robert Downey Jr.'s performance as Wayne Gale in Oliver Stone's film Natural Born Killers.

Dunleavy was portrayed in the ESPN mini-series The Bronx is Burning by actor Seán Martin Hingston.

Several sources speculated that the character Peter Fallow in the novel The Bonfire of the Vanities was based on Dunleavy, however author Tom Wolfe revealed that the character was mainly based on Anthony Haden-Guest.
