= Red West =

American actor (1936–2017)

- Born: Robert Gene West; March 8, 1936; Memphis, Tennessee, U.S.
- Died: July 18, 2017 (aged 81); Memphis, Tennessee, U.S.
- Education: Jones County Junior College
- Occupations: Actor, stunt performer, songwriter, author
- Years active: 1959–2015
- Spouse: Pat Boyd (m. 1961)
- Children: 2
- Relatives: Sonny West (cousin)

Robert Gene "Red" West (March 8, 1936 – July 18, 2017) was an American actor, film stuntman and songwriter. He was known for being a close confidant and bodyguard for rock and roll singer Elvis Presley. After being fired by Presley in 1976, West co-wrote the controversial tell-all book Elvis: What Happened?. The book was published in May 1977 in the UK and later in USA, and alleged Presley had become addicted to drugs. Presley died in August 1977, shortly after publication. (Note: As shown in the complicated history at Elvis Presley#Cause of death, heavy drug use contributed to his life-threatening health problems, but a definitive cause of death is unsettled.)

West was also known to American film audiences for his role in the film Road House, alongside Patrick Swayze. West also appeared to critical acclaim in the 2008 independent film Goodbye Solo.

== Early life ==
West was born in Memphis, Tennessee, to Lois and Newton Thomas West. West was the cousin of actor 'Sonny' West. While attending high school in Tennessee, West and Sonny met Elvis Presley.

An athlete and U.S. Marine, West played football for his high school and junior college at Jones County Junior College teams and was a boxer in the Golden Gloves championships.

In 1961, West married his wife Pat Boyd who was Elvis' secretary. Together, they had two children.

== West and Presley ==
=== Songwriting career ===
West collaborated with Elvis Presley on two songs in 1961 and 1962, which Elvis got a token credit on, "That's Someone You Never Forget" and "You'll Be Gone".

"That's Someone You Never Forget" is the final track on the 1962 album Pot Luck. The song was released as a 45-rpm B-side single in 1967 and features on the Artist of the Century compilation. "You'll Be Gone" is a bonus track on the Girl Happy soundtrack LP. West co-wrote "If You Think I Don't Need You" with Joey Cooper for the motion picture Viva Las Vegas. He teamed up with Joey Cooper again on "I'm A Fool", which Ricky Nelson recorded, and which was later a hit for Dino, Desi and Billy (the partnership of Dean-Paul "Dino" Martin, Desi Arnaz Jr., and William "Billy" Hinsche).

West cowrote the song "Separate Ways" with Richard Mainegra for Elvis in 1972, and "If You Talk in Your Sleep" with Johnny Christopher for Presley's 1975 album Promised Land. Red wrote "If Every Day Was Like Christmas", recorded by Presley in 1966.

In addition to writing for Elvis, Red had songs recorded by Pat Boone, Rick Nelson, Johnny Burnette, Johnny Rivers, Dino, Desi & Billy, Petula Clark, Gary Puckett & The Union Gap, Andre Kostelanetz and His Orchestra, and Little Milton, among others.

=== Elvis' entourage and firing ===
In 1976, West was criticized for allegations of harsh behavior towards Presley’s fans in Las Vegas. West was accused of beating and abusing people, in one case throwing someone through a plate glass window at the Las Vegas Hilton. No criminal charges were filed. In a 1999 interview West said he had overreacted, but also explained the circumstances in Las Vegas had made him highly vigilant to possible threats due to obsessive fans who attempted to access secure backstage areas or get onstage when Presley was performing.

In response to the incidents, Elvis's father fired West, along with his cousin Sonny, and bodyguard David Hebler.

The three subsequently looked for publishers to make money by writing the tell all book Elvis: What Happened?

== Acting and stuntman career ==
When Presley was making films in the 1960s in Hollywood, Red West appeared in small roles in sixteen of the star's films. During this time, West became good friends with actor Nick Adams and his physical abilities got him hired on as a stuntman on Adams' television series, The Rebel.

From there, West went on to do more stunt work in film as well as developing a career as an actor in a number of motion pictures and on television. He frequently served as a stuntman and occasional actor (often playing a henchman) in the CBS TV series The Wild Wild West and was personally friendly with that show's primary star, Robert Conrad. West was one member of a group of stuntmen used frequently by the show. West was credited in S3 E14 "The Night of the Iron Fist" as playing Roy (1967). He played Klaxton in S3 E18 "The Night of the Vipers" (1968). West was severely injured in a stunt gone awry while filming the episode "The Night of the Avaricious Actuary"; according to Conrad and the show's stuntman and choreographer Whitey Hughes, West had broken his skull during one incident on the show (but they do not specify during the filming of which episode that this injury occurred). The show was ultimately eventually cancelled because of pressure from President Lyndon B. Johnson, members of Congress, and concerns from the public over violence on television, which all of whom were concerned was causing, or would cause, an increase in violence across the country.

Conrad himself also suffered a concussion falling from a chandelier in "The Night of the Fugitives" (and other injuries at various points of the series' production, including a "6-inch fracture of the skull, high temporal concussion, [and] partial paralysis."; after this, CBS insisted that he defer to a stunt double. "[W]hen I came back for the fourth season, I was limited to what I could do for insurance reasons," Conrad explained. "So I agreed and gradually I did all the fights but couldn't do anything five feet off the ground and of course that went out the window." After this incident, the show began using a common stunt technique, which filmmakers refer to as "the Texas Switch", in which a stuntman would start the stunt before the main star appeared at its end to continue the show., was often used by Ross Martin and his double, Bob Herron. Conrad criticized congressional pressure for years afterwards, but in other interviews he admitted that it probably was time to cancel the series because he felt that he and the stuntmen were pushing their luck. He also believed the role had hurt his craft.

West also played the role of Sheriff Tanner of Alcorn County, Mississippi in the 1973 film Walking Tall. He also reprised the role in the 1975 film Walking Tall Part 2.

West played the ornery, sometimes violent Master Sergeant Andy Micklin on Black Sheep Squadron. He guest starred twice on the CBS hit detective series Magnum, P.I. as different characters, as five different ones on The A-Team, the Knight Rider pilot episode "Knight of the Phoenix", on The Fall Guy, Simon & Simon and in "The Once and Future King", an episode of The Twilight Zone which concerned Presley. In 1989, West appeared in the action film Road House with Patrick Swayze as Red Webster, the auto parts store owner.

West played the lead role in the 2008 independent film Goodbye Solo as William, an elderly depressed man who befriends a Senegalese man in Winston-Salem, North Carolina. The film received positive reviews and critic Roger Ebert remarked that "West isn't playing himself, but he evokes his character so fully that he might as well be. West's face is a map of hard living".

His last film role was in the 2013 film Safe Haven as Roger, an elderly store clerk in Southport, North Carolina.

== Death ==
West died on July 18, 2017, aged 81, from an aortic aneurysm, at Baptist Memorial Hospital in his native Memphis.

His death occurred less than two months after the death of his cousin, actor Sonny West, in May 2017. His funeral and burial at Memorial Park Cemetery was held on July 24 in Memphis.

== In popular culture ==
In John Carpenter's 1979 film Elvis, West was portrayed by Robert Gray. West was also portrayed by his son John Boyd West in the 2005 Golden Globe winning CBS mini-series Elvis and in the 21st episode of the fifth season of Quantum Leap, Memphis Melody.

== Selected filmography ==
- Journey to the Center of the Earth (1959) - Bearded Man at Newspaper Stand / University Student (uncredited)
- Ice Palace (1960) - Train Passenger (uncredited)
- Flaming Star (1960) - Indian (uncredited)
- Wild in the Country (1961) - Hank Tyler (uncredited)
- Blue Hawaii (1961) - Party Guest (uncredited)
- Follow That Dream (1962) - Bank Guard (uncredited)
- Kid Galahad (1962) - Opponent (uncredited)
- Girls! Girls! Girls! (1962) - Bongo-Playing Crewman on Tuna Boat (uncredited)
- Two for the Seesaw (1962) - Party Guest (uncredited)
- It Happened at the World's Fair (1963) - Fred (uncredited)
- Palm Springs Weekend (1963) - Card Player (uncredited)
- Viva Las Vegas (1964) - Son of Lone Star State (uncredited)
- Shock Treatment (1964) - Orderly (uncredited)
- The Americanization of Emily (1964) - Soldier (uncredited)
- Roustabout (1964) - Carnival Worker (uncredited)
- John Goldfarb, Please Come Home! (1965) - Football Player (uncredited)
- Girl Happy (1965) - Extra in Kit Kat Club (uncredited)
- Tickle Me (1965) - Mabel's Boyfriend (uncredited)
- Harum Scarum (1965) - Assassin (uncredited)
- Paradise, Hawaiian Style (1966) - Rusty (uncredited)
- The Navy vs. the Night Monsters (1966) - Navy Fireman (uncredited)
- Spinout (1966) - Shorty's Pit Crew (uncredited)
- Clambake (1967) - Ice Cream Vendor (uncredited)
- Live a Little, Love a Little (1968) - Newspaper Vendor (uncredited)
- Walking Tall (1973) - Sheriff Tanner
- Framed (1975) - Mallory
- Walking Tall Part II (1975) - Sheriff Tanner
- Angel City (1980) Sud
- Blood Feud (1983) - Violent Teamster
- Road House (1989) - Red Webster
- Trapper County War (1989) - George
- The Legend of Grizzly Adams (1990) - Bodine
- Raw Nerve (1991) - Dave
- Prey of the Chameleon (1992) - Pritchard
- The Gun in Betty Lou's Handbag (1992) - Judge
- Natural Born Killers (1994) - Cowboy Sheriff
- Felony (1994) - Chief Edwards
- The Expert (1995) - Judge
- Her Hidden Truth (1995, TV Movie) - Fireman Leon Sykes
- The P.A.C.K. (1997) - Sheriff Charlie Stone
- The Rainmaker (1997) - Buddy Black
- I Still Know What You Did Last Summer (1998) - Paulsen
- Cookie's Fortune (1999) - Mr. Henderson
- Above Suspicion (2000) - Officer Ward
- Woman's Story (2000) - Judge Ewing
- Vampires Anonymous (2003) - Tom Miller
- Forty Shades of Blue (2005) - Duigan
- Glory Road (2006) - Ross Moore
- Goodbye Solo (2008) - William
- Father of Invention (2010) - Sam Bergman
- The Black Dove (2012) - Detective Randall Hayward
- At Any Price (2012) - Cliff Whipple
- Safe Haven (2013) - Roger
