= Accolades received by Elvis =

Accolades received by Elvis may refer to:

- Achievements by Elvis Presley
- Accolades received by Elvis (1979 film)
- Accolades received by Elvis (2022 film)
- Accolades received by Elvis (miniseries), 2005

== See also ==
- Elvis (disambiguation)
