= Elvis (disambiguation) =

Elvis Presley (1935–1977) was an American singer and actor.

Elvis may also refer to:

== Name ==
- Elvis (name), a given name and a list of people with the name

== Music ==
- Elvis Radio, a station on Sirius Satellite Radio
- Elvis (1956 album), a studio album by Elvis Presley
- Elvis (1968 album), a live album by Elvis Presley
- Elvis (1973 album), a studio album also called The Fool by Elvis Presley
- Elvis (1973 mail-order album), a mail-order greatest hits album by Elvis Presley
- Elvis: A Legendary Performer Volume 1
- Elvis: A Legendary Performer Volume 2
- Elvis: A Legendary Performer Volume 3
- Elvis: A Legendary Performer Volume 4
- Elvis: Greatest Hits Volume 1
- Elvis (musical), a 1977 West End musical
- "Elvis" (song), a song by Leki & the Sweet Mints from Elvis
- "Elvis", a 1993 song by Intaferon
- "Elvis", a 1996 track by Bill Hicks from Arizona Bay
- "Elvis", a 1996 song by Longpigs
- "Elvis", a 2006 song by These New Puritans
- "Elvis", a 2012 song by AOA

== Film and television ==
- Elvis (1968 TV program) or The 68 Comeback Special
- Elvis: That's the Way It Is, a 1970 documentary
- Elvis (1979 film), a television film
- Elvis (1990 TV series)
- Elvis (miniseries), a 2005 CBS miniseries
- Joanna Lumley: Elvis and Me, a 2015 documentary
- Elvis (2022 film), a biopic by Baz Luhrmann

== Other uses ==
- Elvis: What Happened?, a 1977 biography of Presley by Steve Dunleavy
- ELVIS Act (Ensuring Likeness Voice and Image Security Act), 2024 Tennessee law
- Elvis (comic strip), a Swedish comic strip
- Elvis (helicopter)
- Elvis (text editor)
- Elvis impersonator
- Elvis operator, a type of conditional operator in programming
- 17059 Elvis, an asteroid
- Elvis Rock, in Powys, Wales
- Elvis sandwich
- Memphis Summer Storm of 2003 or Hurricane Elvis
- Tropical Storm Elvis
- Elvis, a codename for the Nokia Lumia 1020 smartphone
- Elvis, a 1981 book by Albert Goldman

== See also ==
- Alvis (disambiguation)
- Disappearance of Heather Elvis, American woman who disappeared in 2013
- Elvis taxon
- Saint Elvis (disambiguation)
