= List of accolades received by Elvis (2022 film) =

Elvis accolades
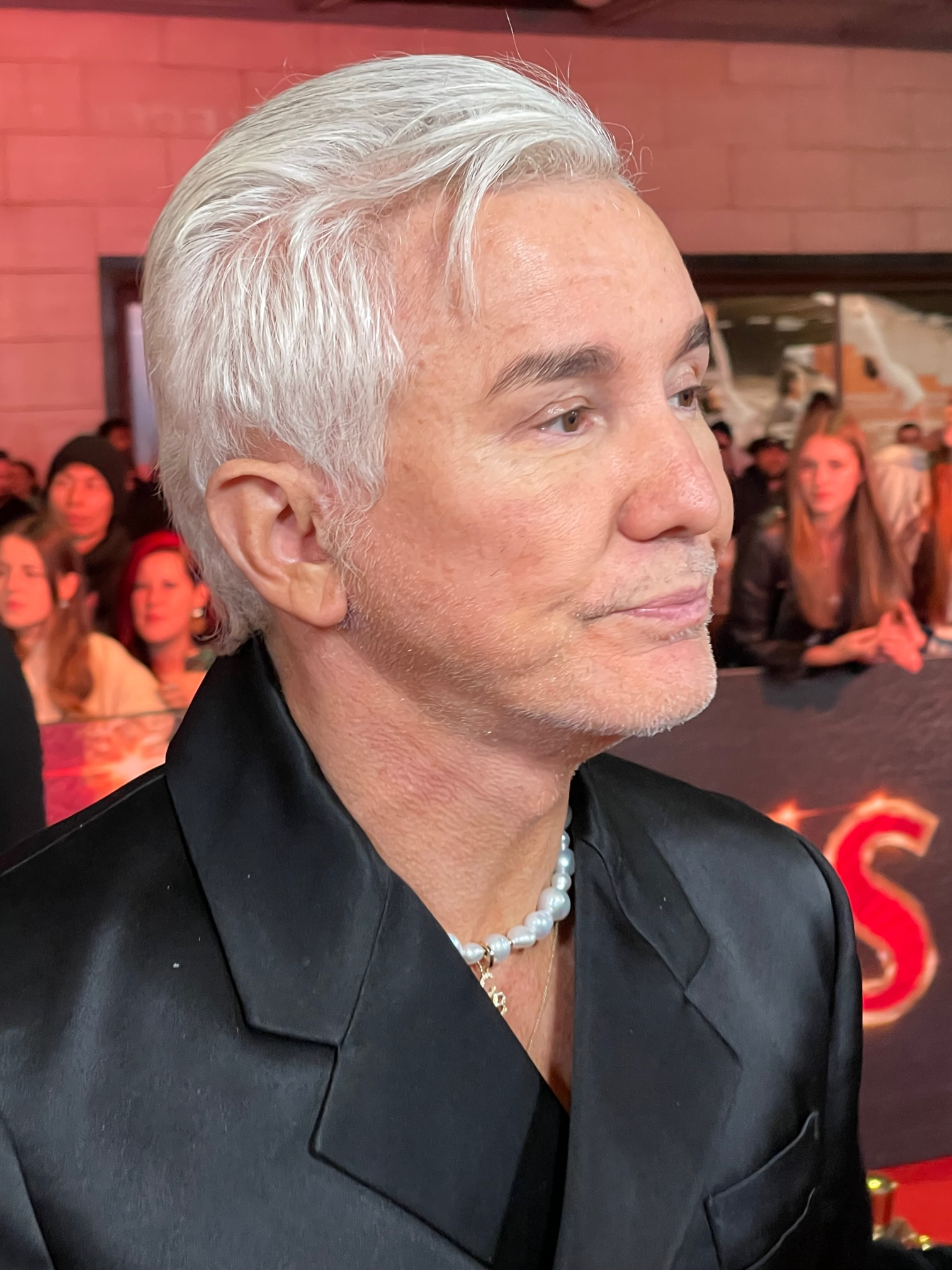
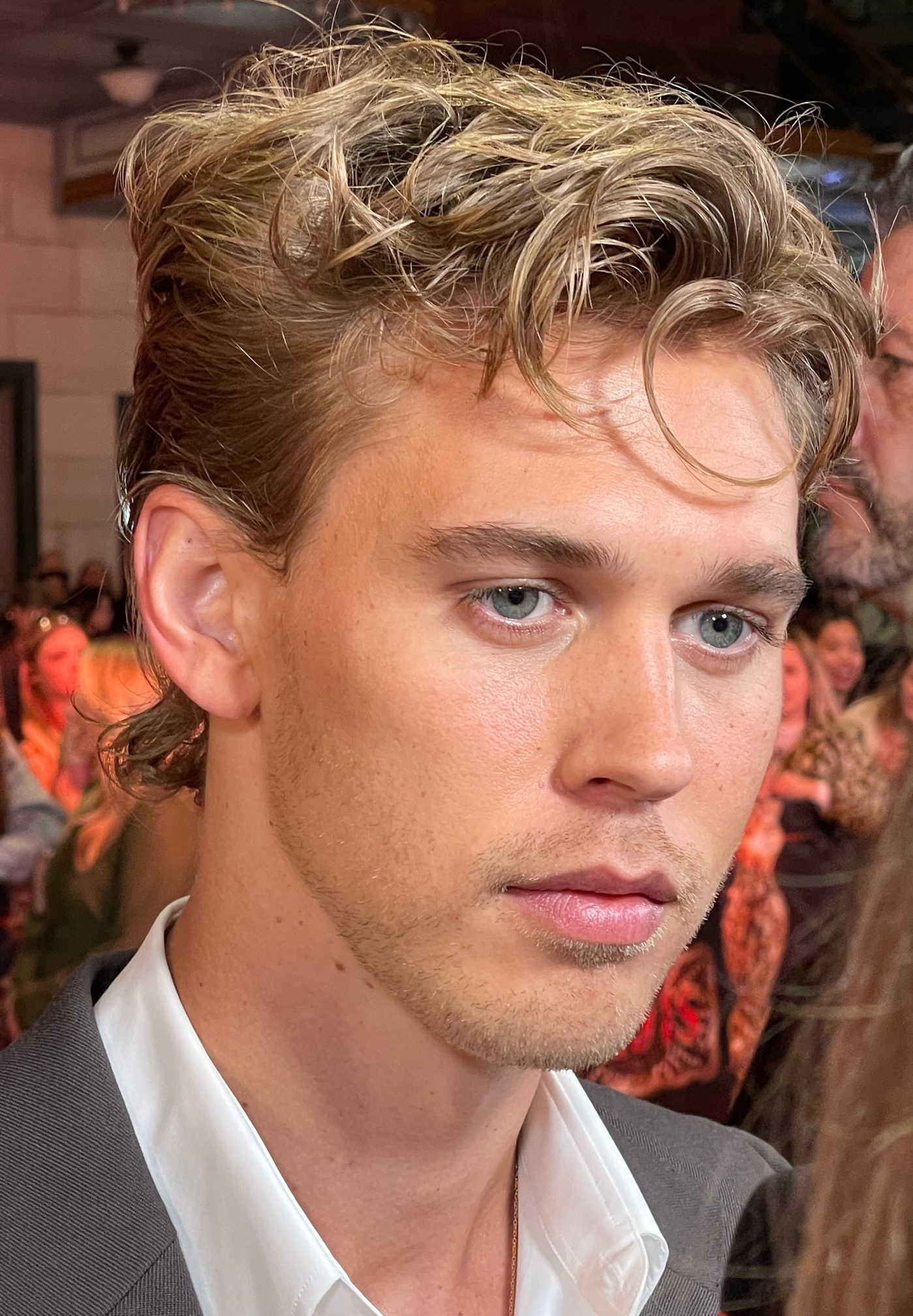
- Director Baz Luhrmann and actor Austin Butler received many awards and nominations for their respective work on the film.
Awards and nominations
Award	Wins	Nominations
AACTA Awards	12	16
AACTA International Awards	2	4
AARP Movies for Grownups Awards	2	3
Academy Awards	0	8
Alliance of Women Film Journalists Awards	0	2
American Cinema Editors Awards	0	1
American Film Institute Awards	1	1
American Music Awards	1	1
American Society of Cinematographers Awards	1	1
Art Directors Guild Awards	0	1
Artios Awards	0	1
Asian Academy Creative Awards	1	1
Austin Film Critics Association Awards	0	2
Billboard Music Awards	0	1
British Academy Film Awards	4	9
Camerimage Awards	1	2
Chicago Film Critics Association Awards	1	2
Cinema Audio Society Awards	0	1
Costume Designers Guild Awards	1	1
Critics' Choice Movie Awards	1	7
David di Donatello Awards	0	1
Dorian Awards	0	3
Dublin Film Critics' Circle Awards	2	2
Florida Film Critics Circle Awards	1	3
Georgia Film Critics Association Awards	0	2
Golden Globe Awards	1	3
Golden Raspberry Awards	2	2
Golden Reel Awards	1	2
Grammy Awards	0	1
Guild of Music Supervisors Awards	1	3
Hollywood Critics Association Awards	0	3
Hollywood Critics Association Creative Arts Awards	0	4
Hollywood Critics Association Midseason Awards	1	3
Hollywood Music in Media Awards	2	3
Hollywood Professional Association Awards	0	2
Houston Film Critics Society Awards	0	3
ICG Publicists Awards	0	1
Irish Film & Television Awards	2	3
London Film Critics' Circle Awards	0	2
Lumiere Awards	2	2
Make-Up Artists and Hair Stylists Guild Awards	2	3
MTV Movie & TV Awards	0	4
NAACP Image Awards	0	1
New York Film Critics Online Awards	2	2
Online Film Critics Society Awards	0	4
People's Choice Awards	1	3
Producers Guild of America Awards	0	1
San Diego Film Critics Society Awards	1	7
San Francisco Bay Area Film Critics Circle Awards	0	2
Sant Jordi Awards	1	1
Satellite Awards	1	9
Screen Actors Guild Awards	0	1
Seattle Film Critics Society Awards	1	3
Set Decorators Society of America Awards	1	1
St. Louis Film Critics Association Awards	3	7
Vancouver Film Critics Circle Awards	0	1
Washington D.C. Area Film Critics Association Awards	0	3

Totals (Note: Certain award groups do not simply award one winner. They acknowledge several different recipients, have runners-up, and have third place. Since this is a specific recognition and is different from losing an award, runner-up mentions are considered wins in this award tally. For simplification and to avoid errors, each award in this list has been presumed to have had a prior nomination.)
- Wins: 57
- Nominations: 166

Elvis is a 2022 biographical drama film directed by Baz Luhrmann from a screenplay co-written with Sam Bromell, Craig Pearce, and Jeremy Doner. It chronicles the life of the American rock and roll singer and actor Elvis Presley under the management of Colonel Tom Parker. The film stars Austin Butler and Tom Hanks as Presley and Parker, respectively, with Olivia DeJonge, Helen Thomson, Richard Roxburgh, David Wenham, Kodi Smit-McPhee, and Luke Bracey in supporting roles.

Elvis debuted at the 75th Cannes Film Festival on May 25, 2022, and was released on June 23 in Australia and on June 24 in the United States. Produced on a budget of $85 million, Elvis grossed $288.7 million worldwide. On the review aggregator website Rotten Tomatoes, the film holds an approval rating of 77% based on 377 reviews.

Elvis garnered awards and nominations in various categories with particular recognition for Luhrmann's direction and Butler's performance, as well as its cinematography, costume and production designs, editing, make-up, and sound effects. It received eight nominations at the 95th Academy Awards, including Best Picture. At the 76th British Academy Film Awards, the film was nominated for Best Film, Best Cinematography, Best Editing, Best Production Design, and Best Sound; and won Best Actor in a Leading Role (Butler), Best Casting, Best Costume Design, and Best Makeup and Hair. Elvis received seven nominations at the 28th Critics' Choice Awards and won Best Hair and Makeup. It garnered three nominations at the 80th Golden Globe Awards, winning for Best Actor in a Motion Picture – Drama (Butler). However, it also won 2 Razzies. In addition, the American Film Institute named Elvis one of the top-ten films of 2022.

== Accolades ==
Accolades received by Elvis (2022 film)
Award	Date of ceremony	Category	Recipient(s)	Result	Ref.
AACTA Awards	December 5, 2022	Best Film	Baz Luhrmann, Catherine Martin, Gail Berman, Patrick McCormick, and Schuyler Weiss	Won	
AACTA Awards	December 5, 2022	Best Direction	Baz Luhrmann	Won	
AACTA Awards	December 5, 2022	Best Lead Actor	Austin Butler	Won	
AACTA Awards	December 5, 2022	Best Supporting Actor	Tom Hanks	Nominated	
AACTA Awards	December 5, 2022	Best Supporting Actress	Olivia DeJonge	Won	
AACTA Awards	December 5, 2022	Best Original Screenplay	Baz Luhrmann, Sam Bromell, Craig Pearce, and Jeremy Doner	Nominated	
AACTA Awards	December 5, 2022	Best Cinematography	Mandy Walker	Won	
AACTA Awards	December 5, 2022	Best Original Music Score	Elliott Wheeler	Nominated	
AACTA Awards	December 5, 2022	Best Editing	Matt Villa and Jonathan Redmond	Won	
AACTA Awards	December 5, 2022	Best Production Design	Catherine Martin, Karen Murphy, and Beverley Dunn	Won	
AACTA Awards	December 5, 2022	Best Costume Design	Catherine Martin	Won	
AACTA Awards	December 5, 2022	Best Sound	David Lee, Wayne Pashley, Andy Nelson, and Michael Keller	Won	
AACTA Awards	December 5, 2022	Best Hair and Makeup	Jason Baird, Mark Coulier, Louise Coulston, and Shane Thomas	Won	
AACTA Awards	December 5, 2022	Best Casting	Nikki Barrett and Denise Chamian	Nominated	
AACTA Awards	December 5, 2022	Best Visual Effects	Tom Wood, Fiona Crawford, Julian Hutchens, Josh Simmonds, and Adam Hammond	Won	
AACTA Awards	December 5, 2022	Audience Choice Award for Best Film	Elvis	Won	
AACTA International Awards	February 24, 2023	Best Film	Elvis	Nominated	
AACTA International Awards	February 24, 2023	Best Direction	Baz Luhrmann	Won	
AACTA International Awards	February 24, 2023	Best Actor	Austin Butler	Won	
AACTA International Awards	February 24, 2023	Best Supporting Actress	Olivia DeJonge	Nominated	
AARP Movies for Grownups Awards	January 28, 2023	Best Movie for Grownups	Elvis	Nominated	
AARP Movies for Grownups Awards	January 28, 2023	Best Director	Baz Luhrmann	Won	
AARP Movies for Grownups Awards	January 28, 2023	Best Time Capsule	Elvis	Won	
Academy Awards	March 12, 2023	Best Picture	Baz Luhrmann, Catherine Martin, Gail Berman, Patrick McCormick, and Schuyler Weiss	Nominated	
Academy Awards	March 12, 2023	Best Actor	Austin Butler	Nominated	
Academy Awards	March 12, 2023	Best Sound	David Lee, Wayne Pashley, Andy Nelson, and Michael Keller	Nominated	
Academy Awards	March 12, 2023	Best Production Design	Catherine Martin, Karen Murphy, and Bev Dunn	Nominated	
Academy Awards	March 12, 2023	Best Cinematography	Mandy Walker	Nominated	
Academy Awards	March 12, 2023	Best Makeup and Hairstyling	Mark Coulier, Jason Baird, and Aldo Signoretti	Nominated	
Academy Awards	March 12, 2023	Best Costume Design	Catherine Martin	Nominated	
Academy Awards	March 12, 2023	Best Film Editing	Matt Villa and Jonathan Redmond	Nominated	
Alliance of Women Film Journalists Awards	January 5, 2023	Best Actor	Austin Butler	Nominated	
Alliance of Women Film Journalists Awards	January 5, 2023	Best Film Editing	Matt Villa and Jonathan Redmond	Nominated	
American Cinema Editors Awards	March 5, 2023	Best Edited Feature Film – Dramatic	Matt Villa and Jonathan Redmond	Nominated	
American Film Institute Awards	December 9, 2022	Top 10 Films of the Year	Elvis	Won (Note: This award does not have a single winner, but recognizes multiple films.)	
American Music Awards	November 20, 2022	Top Soundtrack	Elvis	Won	
American Society of Cinematographers Awards	March 5, 2023	Outstanding Achievement in Cinematography in Theatrical Releases	Mandy Walker	Won	
Art Directors Guild Awards	February 18, 2023	Excellence in Production Design for a Period Film	Catherine Martin and Karen Murphy	Nominated	
Artios Awards	March 9, 2023	Outstanding Achievement in Casting – Big Budget Feature (Drama)	Denise Chamian, Nikki Barrett, Beth Day, and Liz Ludwitzke	Nominated	
Asian Academy Creative Awards	December 8, 2022	Best Visual or Special FX in TV Series or Feature Film	Method Studios	Won	
Austin Film Critics Association Awards	January 10, 2023	Best Actor	Austin Butler	Won	
Austin Film Critics Association Awards	January 10, 2023	The Robert R. "Bobby" McCurdy Memorial Breakthrough Artist Award	Austin Butler	Nominated	
Billboard Music Awards	November 19, 2023	Top Soundtrack	Elvis	Nominated	
British Academy Film Awards	February 19, 2023	Best Film	Gail Berman, Baz Luhrmann, Catherine Martin, Patrick McCormick, and Schuyler Weiss	Nominated	
British Academy Film Awards	February 19, 2023	Best Actor in a Leading Role	Austin Butler	Won	
British Academy Film Awards	February 19, 2023	Best Casting	Nikki Barrett and Denise Chamian	Won	
British Academy Film Awards	February 19, 2023	Best Cinematography	Mandy Walker	Nominated	
British Academy Film Awards	February 19, 2023	Best Editing	Jonathan Redmond and Matt Villa	Nominated	
British Academy Film Awards	February 19, 2023	Best Production Design	Catherine Martin, Karen Murphy, and Bev Dunn	Nominated	
British Academy Film Awards	February 19, 2023	Best Costume Design	Catherine Martin	Won	
British Academy Film Awards	February 19, 2023	Best Makeup and Hair	Jason Baird, Mark Coulier, Louise Coulston, and Shane Thomas	Won	
British Academy Film Awards	February 19, 2023	Best Sound	Michael Keller, David Lee, Andy Nelson, and Wayne Pashley	Nominated	
Camerimage Awards	November 19, 2022	Main Competition (Golden Frog)	Baz Luhrmann and Mandy Walker	Nominated	
Camerimage Awards	November 19, 2022	Audience Award	Mandy Walker and Baz Luhrmann	Won	
Chicago Film Critics Association Awards	December 14, 2022	Best Actor	Austin Butler	Nominated	
Chicago Film Critics Association Awards	December 14, 2022	Most Promising Performer	Austin Butler	Won	
Cinema Audio Society Awards	March 4, 2023	Outstanding Achievement in Sound Mixing for a Motion Picture – Live Action	David Lee, Andy Nelson, Michael Keller, Wayne Pashley, Geoff Foster, Tami Treadwell, and Amy Barber	Nominated	
Costume Designers Guild Awards	February 27, 2023	Excellence in Period Film	Catherine Martin	Won	
Critics' Choice Movie Awards	January 15, 2023	Best Picture	Elvis	Nominated	
Critics' Choice Movie Awards	January 15, 2023	Best Director	Baz Luhrmann	Nominated	
Critics' Choice Movie Awards	January 15, 2023	Best Actor	Austin Butler	Nominated	
Critics' Choice Movie Awards	January 15, 2023	Best Editing	Matt Villa and Jonathan Redmond	Nominated	
Critics' Choice Movie Awards	January 15, 2023	Best Costume Design	Catherine Martin	Nominated	
Critics' Choice Movie Awards	January 15, 2023	Best Production Design	Catherine Martin, Karen Murphy, and Bev Dunn	Nominated	
Critics' Choice Movie Awards	January 15, 2023	Best Hair and Makeup	Elvis	Won	
David di Donatello Awards	May 10, 2023	Best Foreign Film	Elvis	Nominated	
Dorian Awards	February 23, 2023	Film Performance of the Year	Austin Butler	Nominated	
Dorian Awards	February 23, 2023	Film Music of the Year	Elvis	Nominated	
Dorian Awards	February 23, 2023	Campiest Flick of the Year	Elvis	Nominated	
Dublin Film Critics' Circle Awards	December 15, 2022	Best Film	Elvis	6th place	
Dublin Film Critics' Circle Awards	December 15, 2022	Best Actor	Austin Butler	3rd place	
Florida Film Critics Circle Awards	December 22, 2022	Best Actor	Austin Butler	Nominated	
Florida Film Critics Circle Awards	December 22, 2022	Best Art Direction / Production Design	Elvis	Nominated	
Florida Film Critics Circle Awards	December 22, 2022	Breakout Award	Austin Butler	Won	
Georgia Film Critics Association Awards	January 13, 2023	Best Actor	Austin Butler	Nominated	
Georgia Film Critics Association Awards	January 13, 2023	Best Production Design	Catherine Martin, Karen Murphy, and Bev Dunn	Nominated	
Golden Globe Awards	January 10, 2023	Best Motion Picture – Drama	Elvis	Nominated	
Golden Globe Awards	January 10, 2023	Best Director	Baz Luhrmann	Nominated	
Golden Globe Awards	January 10, 2023	Best Actor in a Motion Picture – Drama	Austin Butler	Won	
Golden Raspberry Awards	March 10, 2023	Worst Supporting Actor	Tom Hanks	Won	
Golden Raspberry Awards	March 10, 2023	Worst Screen Combo	Tom Hanks and his latex-laden face (and ludicrous accent)	Won	
Golden Reel Awards	February 26, 2023	Outstanding Achievement in Sound Editing – Feature Dialogue / ADR	Wayne Pashley, Derryn Pasquill, Libby Villa, Nick Breslin, Marisa Marsionis, and Lauren Ligovich	Nominated	
Golden Reel Awards	February 26, 2023	Outstanding Achievement in Music Editing – Feature Motion Picture	Jamieson Shaw, Evan McHugh, and Chris Barrett	Won	
Grammy Awards	February 5, 2023	Best Compilation Soundtrack for Visual Media	Elvis	Nominated	
Guild of Music Supervisors Awards	March 5, 2023	Best Music Supervision for Films Budgeted Over $25 Million	Anton Monsted	Won	
Guild of Music Supervisors Awards	March 5, 2023	Best Song Written and/or Recorded Created for a Film	Jerry Leiber, Mike Stoller, Amala Dlamini, David Sprecher, Rogét Chahayed, Doja Cat, and Anton Monsted for "Vegas"	Nominated	
Guild of Music Supervisors Awards	March 5, 2023	Best Music Supervision in a Trailer – Film	Deric Berberabe and Jordan Silverberg for "Trailer 2"	Nominated	
Hollywood Critics Association Awards	February 24, 2023	Best Picture	Elvis	Nominated	
Hollywood Critics Association Awards	February 24, 2023	Best Director	Baz Luhrmann	Nominated	
Hollywood Critics Association Awards	February 24, 2023	Best Actor	Austin Butler	Nominated	
Hollywood Critics Association Creative Arts Awards	February 24, 2023	Best Costume Design	Catherine Martin	Nominated	
Hollywood Critics Association Creative Arts Awards	February 24, 2023	Best Makeup and Hairstyling	Jason Baird, Mark Coulier, Louise Coulston, and Shane Thomas	Nominated	
Hollywood Critics Association Creative Arts Awards	February 24, 2023	Best Production Design	Catherine Martin, Karen Murphy, and Bev Dunn	Nominated	
Hollywood Critics Association Creative Arts Awards	February 24, 2023	Best Sound	David Lee, Wayne Pashley, Andy Nelson, and Michael Keller	Nominated	
Hollywood Critics Association Midseason Film Awards	July 1, 2022	Best Picture	Elvis	Nominated	
Hollywood Critics Association Midseason Film Awards	July 1, 2022	Best Director	Baz Luhrmann	Nominated	
Hollywood Critics Association Midseason Film Awards	July 1, 2022	Best Actor	Austin Butler	Won	
Hollywood Music in Media Awards	November 16, 2022	Music Supervision — Film	Anton Monsted	Won	
Hollywood Music in Media Awards	November 16, 2022	Music Themed Film, Biopic or Musical	Elvis	Nominated	
Hollywood Music in Media Awards	November 16, 2022	Soundtrack Album	Elvis	Won	
Hollywood Professional Association Awards	November 17, 2022	Outstanding Editing – Theatrical Feature	Wayne Pashley, Jamieson Shaw, and David Lee (Big Bang Sound Design)	Nominated	
Hollywood Professional Association Awards	November 17, 2022	Outstanding Editing – Theatrical Feature	Andy Nelson and Michael Keller (Warner Bros. Post Production Services)	Nominated	
Houston Film Critics Society Awards	February 18, 2023	Best Picture	Elvis	Nominated	
Houston Film Critics Society Awards	February 18, 2023	Best Director	Baz Luhrmann	Nominated	
Houston Film Critics Society Awards	February 18, 2023	Best Actor	Austin Butler	Nominated	
ICG Publicists Awards	March 10, 2023	Maxwell Weinberg Publicists Showmanship Motion Picture Award	Elvis	Nominated	
Irish Film & Television Awards	May 7, 2023	Best Editing	Jonathan Redmond and Matt Villa	Won	
Irish Film & Television Awards	May 7, 2023	Best International Film	Elvis	Nominated	
Irish Film & Television Awards	May 7, 2023	Best International Actor	Austin Butler	Won	
London Film Critics' Circle Awards	February 5, 2023	Actor of the Year	Austin Butler	Nominated	
London Film Critics' Circle Awards	February 5, 2023	Technical Achievement Award	Catherine Martin	Nominated	
Lumiere Awards	February 10, 2023	Best Motion Picture – Musical	Elvis	Won	
Lumiere Awards	February 10, 2023	Best Musical Scene or Sequence	Elvis	Won	
Lumiere Awards	February 10, 2023	Harold Lloyd Award	Elvis	Won	
Make-Up Artists and Hair Stylists Guild Awards	February 11, 2023	Best Period and/or Character Make-Up in a Feature-Length Motion Picture	Shane Thomas and Angela Conte	Won	
Make-Up Artists and Hair Stylists Guild Awards	February 11, 2023	Best Special Make-Up Effects in a Feature-Length Motion Picture	Mark Coulier, Jason Baird, Barrie Gower, Emma Faulkes, and Chloe Muton-Phillips	Nominated	
Make-Up Artists and Hair Stylists Guild Awards	February 11, 2023	Best Period and/or Character Hair Styling in a Feature-Length Motion Picture	Shane Thomas and Louise Coulston	Won	
MTV Movie & TV Awards	May 7, 2023	Best Movie	Elvis	Nominated	
MTV Movie & TV Awards	May 7, 2023	Best Performance in a Movie	Austin Butler	Nominated	
MTV Movie & TV Awards	May 7, 2023	Best Song	Doja Cat for "Vegas"	Nominated	
MTV Movie & TV Awards	May 7, 2023	Best Musical Moment	"Trouble"	Nominated	
NAACP Image Awards	February 25, 2023	Outstanding Breakthrough Performance in a Motion Picture	Yola	Nominated	
New York Film Critics Online Awards	December 11, 2022	Breakthrough Performance	Austin Butler	Won	
New York Film Critics Online Awards	December 11, 2022	Best Use of Music	Elvis	Won	
Online Film Critics Society Awards	January 23, 2023	Best Actor	Austin Butler	Nominated	
Online Film Critics Society Awards	January 23, 2023	Best Editing	Matt Villa and Jonathan Redmond	Nominated	
Online Film Critics Society Awards	January 23, 2023	Best Costume Design	Elvis	Nominated	
Online Film Critics Society Awards	January 23, 2023	Best Production Design	Elvis	Nominated	
People's Choice Awards	December 6, 2022	Movie of 2022	Elvis	Nominated	
People's Choice Awards	December 6, 2022	Drama Movie of 2022	Elvis	Nominated	
People's Choice Awards	December 6, 2022	Drama Movie Star of 2022	Austin Butler	Won	
Producers Guild of America Awards	February 25, 2023	Outstanding Producer of Theatrical Motion Pictures	Baz Luhrmann, Catherine Martin, Gail Berman, Schuyler Weiss, and Patrick McCormick	Nominated	
San Diego Film Critics Society Awards	January 6, 2023	Best Picture	Elvis	Nominated	
San Diego Film Critics Society Awards	January 6, 2023	Best Actor	Austin Butler	Nominated	
San Diego Film Critics Society Awards	January 6, 2023	Best Breakthrough Artist	Austin Butler	Won	
San Diego Film Critics Society Awards	January 6, 2023	Best Editing	Jonathan Redmond and Matt Villa	Nominated	
San Diego Film Critics Society Awards	January 6, 2023	Best Costume Design	Catherine Martin	Nominated	
San Diego Film Critics Society Awards	January 6, 2023	Best Sound Design	Elvis	Runner-up	
San Diego Film Critics Society Awards	January 6, 2023	Best Use of Music	Elvis	Won	
San Francisco Bay Area Film Critics Circle Awards	January 9, 2023	Best Actor	Austin Butler	Nominated	
San Francisco Bay Area Film Critics Circle Awards	January 9, 2023	Best Supporting Actor	Tom Hanks	Nominated	
Sant Jordi Awards	April 25, 2023	Best Actor in a Foreign Film	Austin Butler	Won	
Satellite Awards	March 3, 2023	Best Motion Picture, Comedy or Musical	Elvis	Nominated	
Satellite Awards	March 3, 2023	Best Director	Baz Luhrmann	Nominated	
Satellite Awards	March 3, 2023	Best Actor in a Motion Picture, Comedy or Musical	Austin Butler	Won	
Satellite Awards	March 3, 2023	Best Cinematography	Mandy Walker	Nominated	
Satellite Awards	March 3, 2023	Best Editing	Matt Villa and Jonathan Redmond	Nominated	
Satellite Awards	March 3, 2023	Best Original Song	Doja Cat for "Vegas"	Nominated	
Satellite Awards	March 3, 2023	Best Costume Design	Catherine Martin	Nominated	
Satellite Awards	March 3, 2023	Best Production Design	Catherine Martin and Karen Murphy	Nominated	
Satellite Awards	March 3, 2023	Best Sound	David Lee, Wayne Pashley, Andy Nelson, and Michael Keller	Nominated	
Screen Actors Guild Awards	February 26, 2023	Outstanding Performance by a Male Actor in a Leading Role	Austin Butler	Nominated	
Seattle Film Critics Society Awards	January 17, 2023	Best Actor in a Leading Role	Austin Butler	Nominated	
Seattle Film Critics Society Awards	January 17, 2023	Best Costume Design	Catherine Martin	Won	
Seattle Film Critics Society Awards	January 17, 2023	Best Production Design	Catherine Martin, Karen Murphy, and Bev Dunn	Nominated	
Set Decorators Society of America Awards	February 14, 2023	Best Achievement in Decor/Design of a Period Feature Film	Beverley Dunn, Catherine Martin, and Karen Murphy	Won	
St. Louis Film Critics Association Awards	December 18, 2022	Best Film	Elvis	Nominated	
St. Louis Film Critics Association Awards	December 18, 2022	Best Actor	Austin Butler	Nominated	
St. Louis Film Critics Association Awards	December 18, 2022	Best Costume Design	Catherine Martin	Won	
St. Louis Film Critics Association Awards	December 18, 2022	Best Director	Baz Luhrmann	Nominated	
St. Louis Film Critics Association Awards	December 18, 2022	Best Editing	Jonathan Redmond and Matt Villa	Nominated	
St. Louis Film Critics Association Awards	December 18, 2022	Best Production Design	Catherine Martin and Karen Murphy	Won	
St. Louis Film Critics Association Awards	December 18, 2022	Best Soundtrack	Elvis	Won	
Vancouver Film Critics Circle Awards	February 13, 2023	Best Actor	Austin Butler	Nominated	
Washington D.C. Area Film Critics Association Awards	December 12, 2022	Best Actor	Austin Butler	Nominated	
Washington D.C. Area Film Critics Association Awards	December 12, 2022	Best Production Design	Catherine Martin, Karen Murphy, and Bev Dunn	Nominated	
Washington D.C. Area Film Critics Association Awards	December 12, 2022	Best Editing	Matt Villa and Jonathan Redmond	Nominated	
