= Wayne Pashley =

Australian supervising sound editor, sound designer and re-recording mixer

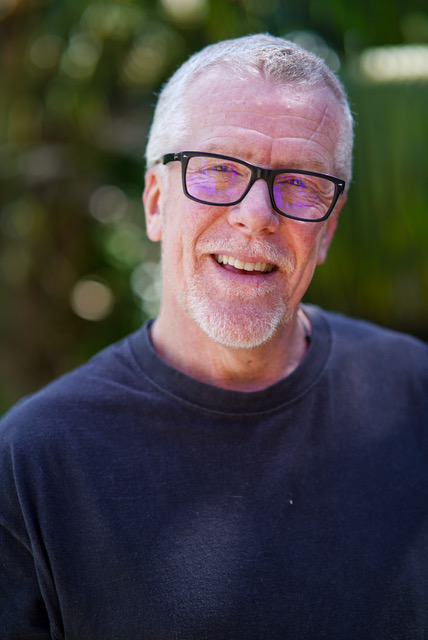
- Born: Sydney, New South Wales, Australia
- Occupation(s): Supervising sound editor, Re-recording mixer, sound designer
- Years active: 1987–present

Wayne Pashley is an Australian supervising sound editor, sound designer and re-recording mixer. He was nominated for an Academy Award in the category Best Sound for the film Elvis. His nomination was shared with David Lee, Andy Nelson and Michael Keller.

== Career ==
Wayne started his career in the early-1980s as a sound editor at the Australian Broadcasting Corporation. He has worked on over 90 films and television series since 1987. He is a co-founder of Big Bang Sound Design.

== Selected filmography ==
- 2023 – Wolf Like Me
- 2022 – Elvis
- 2021 – Life in Colour
- 2019 – Little Monsters
- 2017 – The Lego Ninjago Movie
- 2017 – The Lego Batman Movie
- 2016 – Gods of Egypt
- 2015 – Mad Max: Fury Road
- 2014 – The Water Diviner
- 2014 – The Lego Movie
- 2013 – The Great Gatsby
- 2011 – Happy Feet Two
- 2010 – Legend of the Guardians: The Owls of Ga'Hoole
- 2009 – Daybreakers
- 2008 – Australia
- 2006 – Happy Feet
- 2002 – The Crocodile Hunter: Collision Course
- 1998 – Babe: Pig in the City
- 1997 – Kiss or Kill
- 1995 – Babe

== Selected awards and nominations ==
=== Academy Awards ===
Year	Category	Nominated work	Result	Ref.
2022	Best Sound	Elvis	Nominated	

=== BAFTA Film Awards ===
Year	Category	Nominated work	Result	Ref.
2022	Best Sound	Elvis	Nominated	

=== AACTA Awards ===
Year	Category	Nominated work	Result	Ref.
2022	Best Sound	Elvis	Won	
2021	Best Sound in a Documentary	Life in Colour	Won	
2015	Best Sound	Mad Max: Fury Road	Won	
2014	Best Sound	The Great Gatsby	Won	

=== Australian Screen Sound Guild ===
Year	Category	Nominated work	Result	Ref.
2021	Best Sound for a Documentary	Life in Colour	Won	
2015	Andrew Plain Award for Best Sound Design	The Water Diviner	Won	
2013	Best Sound for an Animated Short Film	Woody	Won	
2013	Best Film Sound Design	The Great Gatsby	Won	
2013	Best Film Sound Mixing	The Great Gatsby	Won	
2011	Best Achievement in Sound for Film Sound Design	Legend of the Guardians: The Owls of Ga'Hoole	Won	
2011	Best Achievement in Sound for Film Sound Design	Legend of the Guardians: The Owls of Ga'Hoole	Won	

=== Motion Picture Sound Editors ===
Year	Category	Nominated work	Result	Ref.
2022	Outstanding Achievement in Sound Editing – Feature Dialogue / ADR	Elvis	Nominated	
2016	Best Sound Editing - Sound Effects and Foley in a Feature Film	Mad Max: Fury Road	Won	
