= Elvis Presley (disambiguation) =

Elvis Presley (1935–1977) was an American singer, actor and philanthropist.

Elvis Presley may also refer to:

- Elvis Presley (album)
- Elvis Presley (The Hitchhiker's Guide to the Galaxy), a character from The Hitchhiker's Guide to the Galaxy

== See also ==
- Elvis (disambiguation)
