= Michael Keller (sound engineer) =

American sound engineer

- Occupation: Sound engineer

Michael Keller is an American sound engineer. He was nominated for an Academy Award in the category Best Sound for the film Elvis.

== Selected filmography ==
- Elvis (2022; co-nominated with David Lee, Wayne Pashley and Andy Nelson)
