= Marion Keisker =

First person to record Elvis Presley

- Born: September 23, 1917; Memphis, Tennessee, US
- Died: December 29, 1989 (aged 72)
- Education: Rhodes College
- Occupations: Radio show host; U.S. Air Force Captain.
- Known for: First person to record Elvis Presley

Marion Keisker MacInnes (September 23, 1917 – December 29, 1989) was an American record producer. She was the first person to record the singing voice of cultural icon Elvis Presley.

== Life ==
Keisker was born in Memphis, Tennessee, and graduated from Southwestern College with a degree in English and Medieval French. She was married to Angus Randall MacInnes and had a son, Angus David MacInnes, before divorcing. She was a radio show host for WREC, where Sam Phillips worked as an announcer. She became a station manager and later Phillips's assistant at the Memphis Recording Service and Sun Records. She was later a U.S. Air Force officer.

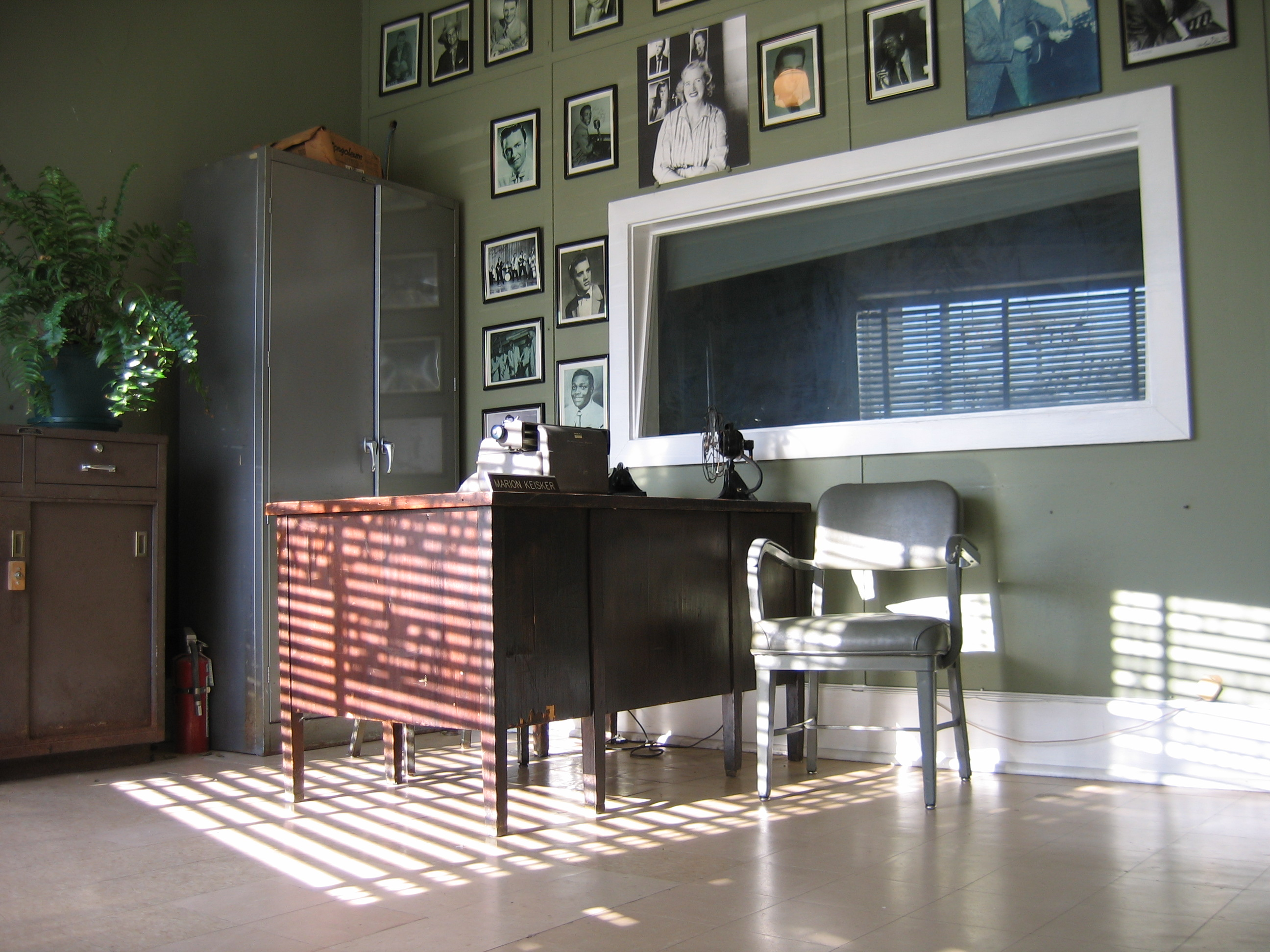
The front office of the Sun Studio, where Keisker worked and greeted many artists on their first visit to the studio

Keisker is best remembered as the first person to record Elvis Presley, on July 18, 1953. She was alone in the office of Sun Records, which also served as office for the Memphis Recording Service, when Presley came there to record two songs, "My Happiness" and "That's When Your Heartaches Begin", for a fee of $3.25. Her exchange with Presley on that occasion has since become part of Elvis lore: "I said, 'What kind of singer are you?' He said, 'I sing all kinds.' I said, 'Who do you sound like?' He said, 'I don't sound like nobody.'"

Keisker left Sun Records in February 1957 and joined the U.S. Air Force, in which she was commissioned as a captain and served as information officer in charge of the Armed Forces television station at the Ramstein Base in Germany. After leaving the Air Force in 1969, Keisker became active in the Memphis chapter of the National Organization for Women. She was chapter president. Her correspondence is archived at the Memphis Public Library.

She has been portrayed by Ellen Travolta in the 1979 film Elvis, by Jill Jane Clements in the 2005 CBS miniseries Elvis, by Margaret Anne Florence in the 2017 CMT series Sun Records and by Kate Mulvany in the 2022 film Elvis.

== Bibliography ==
- Guralnick, Peter (1994). Last Train to Memphis: The Rise of Elvis Presley. New York: Little, Brown. (ISBN 0-316-33220-8)
