= Robert Gray (actor) =

American actor (1945–2013)

- Born: February 10, 1945; Tulsa, Oklahoma, U.S.
- Died: October 31, 2013 (aged 68); Tulsa, Oklahoma, U.S.
- Occupation: Actor
- Years active: 1978–1987

Robert Gray (February 10, 1945 – October 31, 2013) was an American actor.

== Biography ==
Robert Gray was born in Tulsa, Oklahoma.

He began his career with minor roles in TV series such as The Incredible Hulk and The Dukes of Hazzard. In the John Carpenter-directed miniseries Elvis (1979), he played Elvis Presley's best friend Red West. He also had a recurring role as "Cliff Willoughby" in the TV-series Harper Valley PTA. He had supporting roles in a few obscure movies like UFOria (1985) and Omega Syndrome (1986). His movie-credits also include minor roles in The Adventures of Buckaroo Banzai Across the 8th Dimension (1984), Hamburger: The Motion Picture (1986), Armed and Dangerous (1986), and Innerspace (1987), which also marked his final acting credit.

== Filmography ==
Year	Title	Role	Notes
1978	Born Again	Paul Kramer	
1979	Elvis	Red West	TV movie
1982-1984	The Dukes of Hazzard	Potter / Brad Hixx	2 episodes
1984	The Adventures of Buckaroo Banzai Across the 8th Dimension	Radar Blazer	
1985	UFOria	Emile	
1986	Hamburger: The Motion Picture	Busterburger Manager	
1986	Armed and Dangerous	Butcher	9% on Rotten Tomatoes
1986	Omega Syndrome	Saxon	
1987	Innerspace	Lab Assault Henchman #2	(final film role)
