= Bride of Silence =

Bride of Silence Hạt mưa rơi bao lâu
- Directed by: Đoàn Minh Phượng
- Edited by: Matt Villa
- Release date: 2005
- Country: Vietnam
- Language: Vietnamese

Bride of Silence (Hạt mưa rơi bao lâu) is a 2005 Vietnamese film directed by Đoàn Minh Phượng and Doàn Thanh Nghia which played at several overseas film festivals including the 2006 Bangkok International Film Festival. starring Trương Ngọc Ánh. It won the award for Best ASEAN film in 2006.
