= Matt Villa =

Australian film editor

- Born: Australia
- Occupation: Film editor
- Years active: 1999–present

Matt Villa is an Australian film editor, most famous for editing The Great Gatsby, for which he won Best Editing at the 3rd AACTA Awards alongside Jason Ballantine and Jonathan Redmond. Villa won his second AACTA Award the following year for Predestination.

In 2023, Villa was nominated for an Academy Award in the category Best Film Editing for the film Elvis. His nomination was shared with Jonathan Redmond.

== Filmography ==
Year	Film	Director	Notes
1999	Bangers	Andrew Upton	Short film
2001	Neophytes and Neon Lights	Shane T. Hall	
2002	Not Quite Cricket	Linda Kearns-Jesson	Short film
2005	Bride of Silence	Đoàn Minh Phượng	
2005	Stories of Lost Souls	Various	Segment: Bangers
2007	The Final Winter	Brian Andrews; Jane Forrest	
2009	Daybreakers	The Spierig Brothers	
2010	Lest We Forget	Chris Godfrey	
2011	A Heartbeat Away	Gale Edwards	
2013	The Great Gatsby	Baz Luhrmann	AACTA Award for Best Editing; FCCA Award for Best Editing; Nominated — ASE Award for Best Editing
2014	Love Song Devotions	Amanda Hood	Short film
2014	The Water Diviner	Russell Crowe	Nominated — AACTA Award for Best Editing; Nominated — FCCA Award for Best Editing
2014	Predestination	The Spierig Brothers	AACTA Award for Best Editing; FCCA Award for Best Editing
2017	The Lego Batman Movie	Chris McKay	Also voices Killer Croc
2018	Winchester	The Spierig Brothers	
2021	Peter Rabbit 2: The Runaway	Will Gluck	
2022	Elvis	Baz Luhrmann	AACTA Award for Best Editing
2024	Sleeping Dogs	Adam Cooper	
2024	Eden	Ron Howard	
2025	Christy	David Michôd	
2026	Runner	Scott Waugh	
