= Saint Elvis =

Saint Elvis may refer to:

- Saint Ailbe of Emly (fl. 5th century), whose name was often anglicized as 'Elvis'
- St Elvis, a parish in southern Wales named in his honour

== See also ==
- Elvis (disambiguation)
