= Life in Colour (miniseries) =

2021 nature documentary miniseries

- Also known as: Attenborough's Life in Colour; David Attenborough's Life in Colour; Life in Colour with David Attenborough
- Genre: Documentary
- Written by: Sally Thomson; Nick Green; Bridget Appleby; Sharmila Choudhury; Stephen Dunleavy; Adam Geiger
- Directed by: Sally Thomson; Nick Green; Bridget Appleby; Sharmila Choudhury; Adam Geiger
- Narrated by: David Attenborough
- Composer: James Dorman
- Countries of origin: United Kingdom; Australia
- Original language: English
- No. of seasons: 1
- No. of episodes: 3

Production
- Executive producers: Stephen Dunleavy; Colette Beaudry
- Producers: Sharmila Choudhury; (Series Producer); Rachel Higgins; Carolyn Johnson
- Camera setup: Multi-camera
- Running time: 50 minutes
- Production companies: Humble Bee Films; Sealight Pictures

Original release
- Network: BBC One
- Release: 28 February – 22 April 2021

Life in Colour (Note: Also known as Attenborough's Life in Colour and Life in Colour with David Attenborough.) is a 2021 British-Australian nature documentary television miniseries presented and narrated by David Attenborough. It consists of three episodes.

== Production ==
The series was co-produced by Humble Bee Films and Sealight Pictures for Netflix, the BBC, Stan, and the Nine Network. Sharmila Choudhury served as series producer, with Stephen Dunleavy and Colette Beaudry as Executive Producers. It was originally envisaged as having four episodes, but this was scaled back to three due to the COVID-19 pandemic.

The first episode of Life in Colour aired on 28 February 2021 on BBC One and on 3 July 2021 on Nine Network in Australia.

== Episodes ==
Viewing data sourced from BARB.

No.	Title	Produced by	Original release date	UK viewers (millions)
1	"Seeing in Colour"	Sally Thomson	28 February 2021	5.70
A male peacock attempts to woo a mate with his display. Male mandrills develop brightly-colored faces and posteriors to warn rival males. A male Costa's hummingbird performs a flight display to attract a female. A male magnificent bird-of-paradise performs for several females and manages to successfully mate with one. Attenborough uses an ultraviolet filter to demonstrate how pollinating insects see flowers. A blue moon butterfly settles disputes with competitors through aerial displays and also displays for females, which have ultraviolet vision. Male fiddler crabs use their claws to display for females, with a perspective of polarized light. Fish on the Great Barrier Reef have evolved specific patterns that are only visible under ultraviolet light. Peacock mantis shrimps can perceive color faster than any other animal due to having more color receptors, and can also distinguish between polarized and unpolarized light, allowing them to signal mates and warn rivals with scales that reflect polarized light. Andean flamingos perform courtship dances in the Atacama Desert and obtain pink pigments from carotenoids in the algae and shrimp they eat. Strawberry poison-dart frogs obtain their bright warning coloration from the food they eat, show extensive color variation across their range due to differing diets, and fight intruding rival frogs.
2	"Hiding in Colour"	Nick Green	7 March 2021	5.38
A Bengal tiger hunts chital deer, which are unable to spot it, but are successfully warned in advance by grey langur sentries, and it unsuccessfully attempts to hunt sambar instead. In the Scottish Highlands, rock ptarmigan molt into white feathers during the winter to camouflage in the snow and avoid predation, a trait shared by several other animals. Yellow-colored whitebanded crab spiders break down pigments to change into a white coloration, allowing them to camouflage and ambush prey on white flowers. This also allows them to reflect ultraviolet light, which acts as a signal luring bees towards them. On the African plains, zebras use their stripes to confuse attacking cheetahs and ward off biting flies. Cuban painted snails display polymorphism by acquiring different colors depending on the plants they eat, foiling potential predators. Insects use many different forms of mimicry, such as the Danaid eggfly which mimics the colors of the poisonous African queen butterfly. On the Great Barrier Reef, the bluestriped fangblenny can change its colors to mimic the young bluestreak cleaner wrasse, allowing it to bite small pieces off fishes seeking cleaning. In Africa, a hatchling pin-tailed whydah successfully parasitizes the broods of common waxbills by mimicking the mouth patterns of its nestmates. By the Augrabies Falls of South Africa, a young male Augrabies flat lizard delays the development of his breeding colors and mimics the coloration of a female to access feeding areas guarded by territorial males.
3	"Chasing Colour"	Bridget Appleby	22 April 2021	N/A

== Reception ==
The Hindu's Aswathi Pacha praised the series, noting Attenborough's enthusiasm. Common Sense Media gave the series four out of five stars. Yvonne Bohwongprasert's review for the Bangkok Post was generally positive, but criticised the film for failing to mention the "ongoing climate crisis".
