= Elvis (1973 mail-order album) =

Greatest hits album by Elvis Presley
- Released: August 2, 1973
- Recorded: April 1956 – March 1962
- Genre: Rock and roll
- Length: 46:18
- Label: RCA Special Products

Elvis Presley chronology
Elvis (1973)	Elvis (1973)	Raised on Rock/For Ol' Times Sake (1973)

Elvis is a 2 record greatest-hits album by American rock and roll singer Elvis Presley, issued in August 1973 by RCA Special Products in association with Brookville Records. The double album compiled many of Presley's best-selling singles released from 1956 to 1962. It is the first mail-order album released during his lifetime and the most popular, certified 5× platinum on December 1, 2010, by the Recording Industry Association of America.

Like most RCA reissues in the 1970s of Presley's early material, the original monophonic recordings were in reprocessed ("fake") stereophonic sound. The cover photo of Presley was taken from the worldwide television broadcast Aloha from Hawaii via Satellite that was seen earlier in the year. The double album was also available on 8-track and cassette tape formats.

== Reissues ==
After Presley's unexpected death in August 1977, a limited edition numbered commemorative version on gold vinyl was available for a few years. Early copies included a photo album and a certificate of authenticity.

== Track listing ==
Side 1
No.	Title	Writer(s)	Date recorded	Length
1.	"Hound Dog"	Jerry Leiber, Mike Stoller	July 2, 1956	2:15
2.	"I Want You, I Need You, I Love You"	Maurice Mysels and Ira Kosloff	April 14, 1956	2:40
3.	"All Shook Up"	Otis Blackwell, Elvis Presley	January 12, 1957	1:57
4.	"Don't"	Jerry Leiber and Mike Stoller	September 6, 1957	2:48
5.	"I Beg of You"	Rose Marie McCoy and Cliff Owens	February 23, 1957	1:50

Side 2
No.	Title	Writer(s)	Date recorded	Length
6.	"A Big Hunk o' Love"	Aaron Schroeder and Sidney Wyche	June 10, 1958	2:12
7.	"Love Me"	Leiber, Stoller	September 1, 1956	2:43
8.	"Stuck on You"	Aaron Schroeder, J. Leslie McFarland	March 20, 1960	2:18
9.	"Good Luck Charm"	Aaron Schroeder, Wally Gold	October 15, 1961	2:24
10.	"Return to Sender"	Otis Blackwell and Winfield Scott	March 27, 1962	2:09

Side 3
No.	Title	Writer(s)	Date recorded	Length
11.	"Don't Be Cruel"	Blackwell, Presley	July 2, 1956	2:02
12.	"Loving You"	Jerry Leiber and Mike Stoller	February 24, 1957	2:12
13.	"Jailhouse Rock"	Leiber, Stoller	April 30, 1957	2:27
14.	"Can't Help Falling In Love"	George David Weiss, Hugo Peretti and Luigi Creatore	March 23, 1961	2:59
15.	"I Got Stung"	David Hill and Aaron Schroeder	June 11, 1958	1:49

Side 4
No.	Title	Writer(s)	Date recorded	Length
16.	"(Let Me Be Your) Teddy Bear"	Kal Mann, Bernie Lowe	January 24, 1957	1:45
17.	"Love Me Tender"	Presley, Vera Matson	August 24, 1956	2:41
18.	"Hard Headed Woman"	Claude Demetrius	January 15, 1958	1:53
19.	"It's Now or Never"	Eduardo di Capua, Aaron Schroeder, Wally Gold	April 3, 1960	3:15
20.	"Surrender"	Doc Pomus, Mort Shuman	October 30, 1960	1:52

== Certifications ==
Region	Certification	Certified units/sales
United States (RIAA)	5× Platinum	5,000,000^{^}
^{^} Shipments figures based on certification alone.
