= Đoàn Minh Phượng =

Vietnamese film director

Đoàn Minh Phượng (born 1956, in Saigon, South Vietnam) is a noted film director from Vietnam. She is best known for her 2005 film Bride of Silence (Hạt mưa rơi bao lâu), which played at several overseas film festivals.
