= Elvis (1979 film) =

1979 television film directed by John Carpenter

- Promotional release poster
- Genre: Biography; Drama; Music
- Written by: Anthony Lawrence
- Directed by: John Carpenter
- Starring: Kurt Russell; Shelley Winters; Season Hubley; Bing Russell
- Theme music composer: Joe Renzetti
- Country of origin: United States
- Original language: English

Production
- Executive producer: Dick Clark
- Producer: Anthony Lawrence
- Cinematography: Donald M. Morgan
- Editors: Christopher Holmes; Ron Moler
- Running time: 168 minutes
- Production company: Dick Clark Productions
- Budget: $2.1 million or $4 million

Original release
- Network: ABC
- Release: February 11, 1979

Elvis is a 1979 American made-for-television biographical film aired on ABC. It is directed by John Carpenter and stars Kurt Russell as Elvis Presley, and marked the first collaboration between Carpenter and Russell.

After its success on television in the United States, a shorter re-edited version of Elvis was released theatrically throughout Europe and Australia. It was nominated for a Golden Globe Award for Best Motion Picture Made for Television, and for three Primetime Emmy Awards (including Outstanding Lead Actor in a Limited Series or a Special for Russell).

== Plot ==
In July 1969, Elvis Presley is performing at his first live performance in eight years at the International Hotel in Las Vegas. While in his suite, Elvis worries about this and remembers how he became the King of Rock and Roll.

As he plays his guitar, he flashes back to living with his parents in Tupelo, Mississippi in 1945 where he goes outside and visits the grave of his stillborn twin brother, Jesse. After another kid sees him doing this, they fight, and Elvis returns home to sing with his neighbors.

In 1953, he now lives in Memphis and gets harassed by boys his age in the high school bathroom for his stylish hair. Red West threatens them to stop and he befriends Elvis. Despite his strange appearance, he is able to catch the interest of others through his style of singing and playing the guitar when he sings "Good Rockin Tonight" outside the school. After this, Elvis returns to his apartment when the landlord comes in and gives an eviction notice, upsetting his mother, Gladys. Elvis's girlfriend Bonnie convinces him to perform in the school talent show despite his fear. He sings "Old Shep", winning the talent show and exciting the audience. After this, Elvis and Bonnie lovingly talk to each other on a hill, they promise to stay together forever and share a kiss.

By the summer of 1953, Elvis is out of high school and wants a job as a musician, however he decides to get a job at Crown Electric while he gets started as a musician. Elvis goes to a music store and listens to a blues band sing "That's All Right". Bonnie finds him and tells him that there's a record company in town that Elvis could make his own recording and give it to Gladys as a birthday present. In the studio, he sings "My Happiness", and the producer, Sam Phillips, is told by his assistant that Elvis is a white person with a "negro sound", which Sam has been looking for because he believes that will make him millions. Sam calls Elvis and offers him a deal to make records, and Elvis instantly runs inside and says yes.

At Sun Records, Elvis is assigned two session musicians, Scotty Moore (lead guitar) and Bill Black (bass) to accompany him on acoustic guitar. They start playing "That's All Right" by Big Boy Crudup. Sam likes this, and encourages them to keep that style of sound going. In July 1954, his recording of "That's All Right" is released and Elvis leaves the house because he's too nervous to hear it on the radio. Just as he leaves, it starts playing. Gladys and Vernon find him at a movie theater and tell him that it's been played multiple times on the radio. Due to his local success, he starts playing gigs and wins over the audience through his energy and sex appeal on stage. To further his career, Elvis travels to Nashville with his band to audition for the Grand Ole Opry. He performs his song "Blue Moon of Kentucky", but he is told to reconsider truck driving when he is done. After this, Elvis storms off the stage and smashes his guitar.

By 1955, Elvis has continued to perform with huge audience appeal as well as adding D. J. Fontana to play drums for his band. During one of his performances, a mysterious old man with a cigar standing in a corner watches Elvis excite the audience through his dance moves. After the concert a fan punches him in the face and drives off, leading Elvis and his friends to chase after him in his car. However, they are forced to stop after the engine is blown. They find their way to a gas station by the next morning, and on a phone call with Gladys she tells Elvis that Bonnie has left him for another boyfriend due to a distance growing in their relationship because of Elvis's job. The mysterious old man, revealed to be named Colonel Tom Parker, talks to Scotty and Bill, and they encourage him to manage Elvis. The Colonel is able to get Elvis bigger gigs, widening his appeal to bigger audiences and $2,000 a week. With this money, he buys Gladys a pink Cadillac and diamonds. The Colonel reveals this is just the beginning, and that RCA wants to buy Elvis's contract from Sun Records. Elvis is reluctant due to his loyalty to Sam, but they both agree it is for the best.

In 1956, Elvis records Heartbreak Hotel with a bigger session band in a bigger studio. He starts to become a success throughout America, and the concerts start to exhaust him, causing him to faint before one of his shows. In the hospital, he finds out that he has been offered a film role by Hal Wallis, who saw him perform in public television. He goes to Hollywood where he struggles to play his role in the movie Love Me Tender. He meets and befriends actor Nick Adams, who is a fan of his. The Colonel comes to tell him and his parents that he signed him to play on The Ed Sullivan Show, but they only film above his waist to censor his dance moves. After this, Elvis becomes a controversial figure and is nicknamed "Elvis the Pelvis" by the press.

In 1957, Elvis purchases the Graceland mansion for him and his parents to live in, he gives them a tour and it is revealed that "Heartbreak Hotel" went gold. As he gets bigger, the negative effects of Elvis's fame start to show, as he can no longer go anywhere without being swarmed by fans. When he rents out an arcade for Natalie Wood and his friends, paparazzi come in and start taking pictures and asking questions, causing Elvis to take one of the cameras and use it to break a gumball machine, and he leaves with his friends. Gladys is also shown to be stressed by her son's fame.

In 1958, Elvis is drafted in the army and dyes his hair black to look more like a movie star, as he plans to focus on that more after he completes his service. The military service proves to be a draining experience because of the attention he gets from fellow soldiers and the break he has to take from music and movies for the next two years. While he is in the army, his parents stay in a trailer. Gladys starts to worry about Elvis having to go to Germany for the military. He starts to realize strange behavior in Gladys and calls an ambulance. He gets an emergency leave and visits her in the hospital where she is not doing well. They have a conversation about Elvis's stillborn brother, Jesse Garon. As Elvis leaves the room, Vernon tells him that Gladys has hepatitis. As Vernon and Elvis sleep in the hospital room, Vernon wakes up and finds Gladys unresponsive, she is then pronounced dead. After the funeral, Red comes in the trailer to comfort Elvis.

Elvis is transferred to a base in Germany where he learns karate moves, he is still shown to be depressed over his mother's death. He meets 14 year old Priscilla Beaulieu, daughter of an Air Force office. Elvis falls in love with her and plays "Unchained Melody" for her on the piano. He starts to bond with her and she gives him a spark of happiness in the military. At a bar, he sees a band play and the accordion player asks Elvis to sing for them. He gets up on stage and sings "Tutti Frutti", which the audience enjoys.

In 1960, Elvis returns to America after completing his service. However, he and Vernon still struggle with the death of Gladys. Elvis and his friends assemble a model airplane and fly it in the yard but he is unable to leave Graceland due to public recognition. Despite this, he is still reminded of Priscilla and calls her father to ask him if she can come to Graceland for Christmas, he eventually allows her to go and she bonds with Elvis. He performs his last concert in 1961 before deciding to focus more on his film career.

In 1963, Elvis is getting his hair done while watching the news of John F. Kennedy being assassinated, which makes him think that he is going to be assassinated in a similar manner. In 1967, he marries Priscilla in Las Vegas and starts to resent his fame because of the image he has to keep and the things that he is unable to do anymore. At a roller rink, Elvis and Red get into an argument and Red gets angry that he was not allowed at the wedding. Elvis and Priscilla take a ride in a golf cart, and they express their love for each other, while Elvis expresses that he is scared of losing her love and that he does not want to go to his film rehearsal. During the film rehearsal he throws pies at his costars to have fun. The director yells at him for doing this but Elvis tells him that he only does these kinds of movies to have fun, and will not do them anymore if they stop being that way. He buys one of his friends a car and Priscilla expresses her concern that they have not been alone together too much lately.

All of these start to change his behavior, as he fears he is becoming irrelevant and losing the only woman he loves. He gets angry about Priscilla for being away for hours and thinks his friend Sonny said something about him, firing him and all his friends. However, he regrets this and asks his friend Johnny to get them back. While he is watching a movie, Priscilla tells Elvis she is pregnant, which excites him. However, he gets angry when he finds out that his voice was being amplified over the jordanaires and the backing band, and he throws a lamp, causing it to break. He apologizes for the destruction he caused, and worries about losing his relevance.

On February 1, 1968, Elvis is practicing karate and finds out Priscilla gave birth to a baby girl. He has a talk with Jesse about the fact that he has everything he has wanted but still feels like there is something missing and that he is empty on the inside. In the middle of the night, he reads a poem about life and death to Priscilla and questions why everything in his life happened. The next morning during breakfast, Priscilla tells Elvis about a friend who she allowed to stay in Graceland. Elvis refuses because of his disdain for outsiders due to his inability to be himself around them. Priscilla then gets angry because Elvis never allows her to make her own friends and have her own life, so she gets up and storms out of the room.

By 1969, Elvis has successfully revived interest in him and his music after performing on a television special the previous year. He records his hit song "Suspicious Minds" in California while he plans his concerts for his comeback tour. However, Priscilla hears about this before he can tell her. He promises to have a child with her and take her to Europe after the concert tour, and she tells him that if anything happens, she can make it on her own, and they hug.

Elvis has another conversation with Jesse about how he's likely going to be killed in a few years like Kennedy and Dr. King and will not make it much past 40, but wants to feel the onstage glory of the early days one more time. He sings "Sweet Caroline" to Lisa Marie and finally goes to Vegas. The flashback ends, and Elvis prepares to play at the International Hotel. Everyone he knows tells him it is not safe, but he insists. Before going on, he calls Lisa Marie, and promises to come home. He hears the intro play as his cue and walks on stage for the first time in years. He sings "Blue Suede Shoes", and "The Wonder of You", and as he hears the audience applauding, he realizes that he still has it after all these years, and that he has proven that he is, and has always been, the king.

== Cast ==
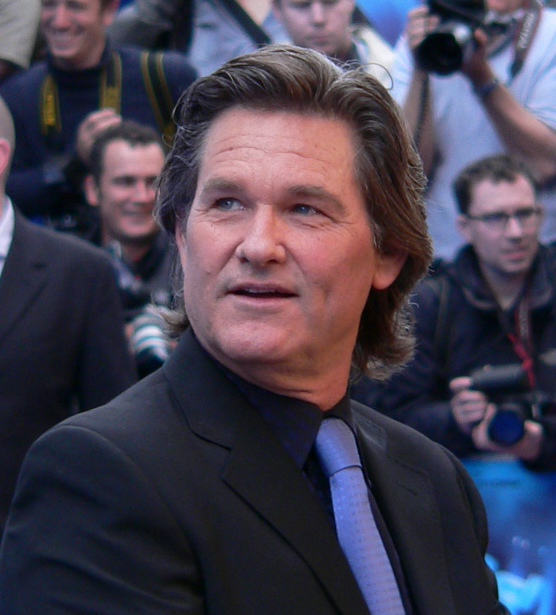
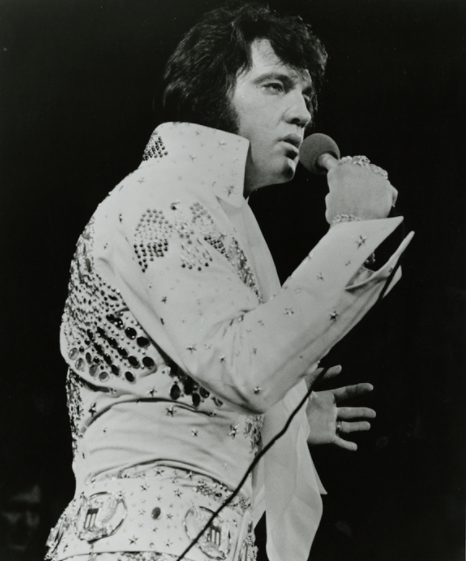
Kurt Russell (left, pictured in 2006) portrays music icon Elvis Presley (right, pictured in 1973) from 1953 to 1969.
- Kurt Russell as Elvis Presley
  - Ronnie McDowell as Presley's singing voice
- Shelley Winters as Gladys Presley
- Season Hubley as Priscilla Presley
- Bing Russell as Vernon Presley
- Robert Gray as Red West
- Pat Hingle as Colonel Tom Parker
- Melody Anderson as Bonnie
- Charles Cyphers as Sam Phillips
- Ellen Travolta as Marion Keisker
- Will Jordan as Ed Sullivan
- Joe Mantegna as Joe Esposito
- Peter Hobbs as Jim Denny
- Ed Begley Jr. as D.J. Fontana
- James Canning as Scotty Moore
- Elliott Street as Bill Black
- Charlie Hodge as himself

== Production ==
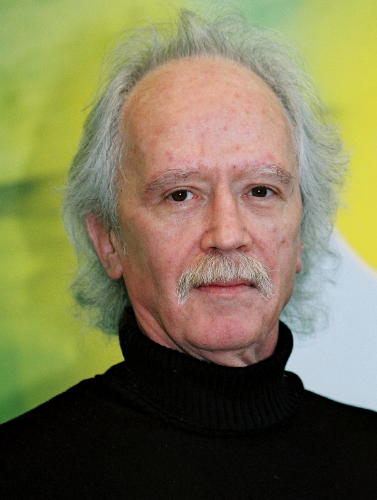
Director John Carpenter (in 2001). Elvis marks the first collaboration between Carpenter and Russell.

Carpenter wanted to make the film because "I wanted to work with actors. I wanted to do a dramatic film. I wanted to do something different. And Elvis was the first thing that came along that I had any feeling for, personally-because I did have a feeling for Elvis, I liked him very much, cared about him. So it seemed like a pretty good package when it arrived. After it was over I was disappointed in some of my work, and I was disappointed that I didn't have more participation in the editing."

Carpenter says the film involved 150 locations and was shot over 30 days. "Some of the days we were moving to three and four different locations," he said. "When you have a big union crew with a lot of trucks and bullshit, you have to run very fast. You have to shoot something in the morning, shoot something in mid-afternoon, and shoot something right before you quit at night. That's what happened. We were just running."

Carpenter was not able to edit or score the film and found it an unhappy experience.

Russell worked with and met Elvis in the film It Happened at the World's Fair (1963). In the film, Elvis wants to meet the fairground's nurse and he pays a young boy, played by the twelve-year-old Russell, to kick him in the shins. Later in the film, he sees Elvis and the nurse together on a date and asks if he can kick him again for money. Russell also dubbed the voice of a young Elvis in Forrest Gump (1994), and played an Elvis impersonator in the film 3000 Miles to Graceland (2001).

Country singer Ronnie McDowell provided the vocals for a number of songs Russell performed in the film. McDowell recorded 36 songs for the soundtrack, of which 25 were used.

According to several reports, Priscilla Presley was paid $50,000 to check the script for accuracy before shooting commenced.

== Reception ==
DVD cover art

Elvis originally aired on ABC opposite two blockbuster films; Gone with the Wind (1939) on CBS, and One Flew Over the Cuckoo's Nest (1975) on NBC. Despite this, Elvis beat both in the Nielsen ratings, receiving a 27.3 rating compared to 24.3 and 22.5 respectively. Elvis was ranked the sixth most watched program of the week.

After its success on television, a shortened version of the film was released theatrically throughout Europe. The film debuted on DVD and Blu-ray via Freemantle in early 2010 and on a Blu-ray re-release in 2016 via Shout! Factory. The Blu-ray disc edition is presented in a 1.78:1 aspect ratio, in contrast to the original 1.33:1 televised presentation, or the 1.66:1 European theatrical release.

A shorter, re-edited version of Elvis, was released theatrically throughout Europe and Australia. It grossed $50,000 in its opening weekend in Australia in August and grossed $350,000 in 3 weeks. It grossed $25,000 in its first 10 days in Helsinki, Finland.

== Accolades ==
Year	Award	Category	Nominee(s)	Result	Ref.
1979	Primetime Emmy Awards	Outstanding Lead Actor in a Limited Series or a Special	Kurt Russell	Nominated	
1979	Primetime Emmy Awards	Outstanding Achievement in Makeup	Marvin Westmore	Nominated	
1979	Primetime Emmy Awards	Outstanding Cinematography for a Limited Series or a Special	Donald M. Morgan	Nominated	
1980	Golden Globe Awards	Best Motion Picture Made for Television		Nominated	

== Legacy ==
Elvis is notable in Carpenter's career for two reasons. It was made after Halloween (1978) had wrapped, so it offered him an avenue to try his hand at a film away from the horror genre. It was also the first time Carpenter had worked with Kurt Russell, who became a frequent collaborator of Carpenter's. Russell subsequently starred in Escape from New York (1981), The Thing (1982), Big Trouble in Little China (1986), and Escape from L.A. (1996).

Russell married co-star Season Hubley on March 17, 1979, and they divorced in 1983. Bing Russell, who played Vernon Presley, is Kurt Russell's real father. For several years Bing played Deputy Clem Poster in the TV series Bonanza.

== Charts ==
Chart (1979)	Position
Australia (Kent Music Report)	55

== See also ==
- Elvis (miniseries)
- Elvis (2022 film)
