= Elvis (miniseries) =

2005 biographical CBS mini-series directed by James Steven Sadwith

- Written by: Patrick Sheane Duncan
- Directed by: James Steven Sadwith
- Starring: Jonathan Rhys Meyers; Rose McGowan; Randy Quaid; Tim Guinee; Camryn Manheim; Robert Patrick
- Music by: Steve Dorff
- Country of origin: United States
- Original language: English

Production
- Producer: Judy Cairo
- Editors: Sam Patterson; Katina Zinner
- Running time: 174 minutes

Original release
- Network: CBS
- Release: May 8 – May 11, 2005

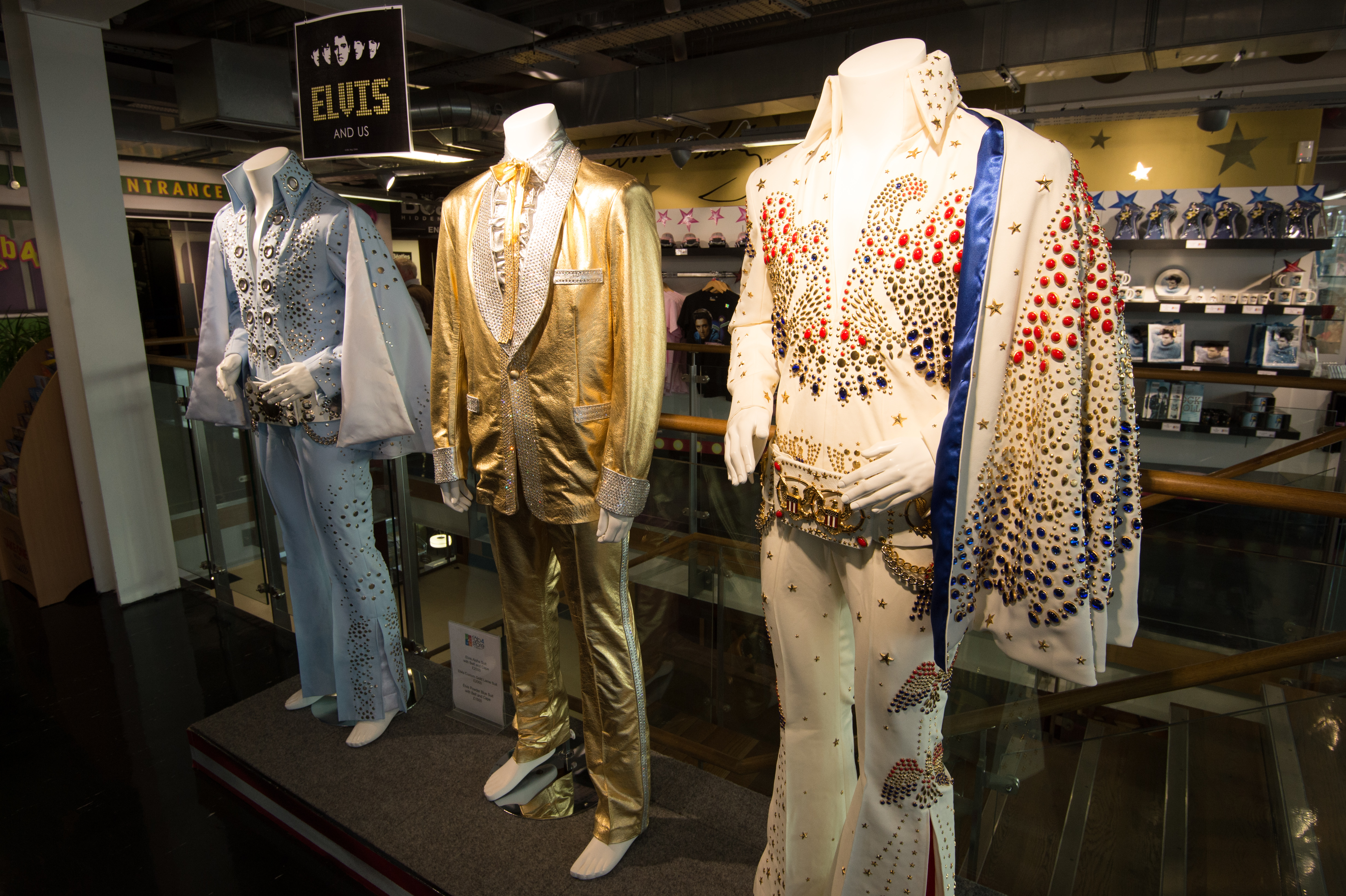
Elvis Presley's gold lamé suit (middle, shown at The Beatles Story exhibit in 2012) was re-designed for the mini-series, in a scene where Presley tries on the gold jacket for the first time, leading to a performance of "Blue Suede Shoes" on stage at the Chicago Auditorium, the mini-series's most popular sequence.

Elvis (also known as Elvis: The Miniseries or Elvis: The Early Years) is a 2005 biographical CBS miniseries written by Patrick Sheane Duncan and directed by James Steven Sadwith. It chronicles the rise of American music icon Elvis Presley from his high school years to his international superstardom.

The cast includes Irish actor Jonathan Rhys Meyers as Elvis, Rose McGowan as Ann-Margret, Randy Quaid as "Colonel" Tom Parker, Camryn Manheim as Gladys Presley, Robert Patrick as Vernon Presley, Tim Guinee as Sam Phillips, Jack Noseworthy as Steve Binder, Antonia Bernath as Priscilla Presley, Stuart Greer as Captain Beaulieu, Clay Steakley as Bill Black, Mark Adam as Scotty Moore, John Boyd West as Red West and Randy McDowell as Gene Smith.

Rhys Meyers won the Golden Globe Award for Best Actor – Miniseries or Television Film for his performance as Elvis Presley.

== Plot ==
The miniseries begins in 1968 at NBC Studios, Hollywood, with Elvis Presley performing at his Comeback Special concert. As the audience awaits his presence in the main hall, Presley sits backstage in his dressing room, nervous as he hasn't played in front of a live audience in more than seven years. TV Producer Steve Binder, along with Presley's guitarist Scotty Moore, assures Presley "You're the King. You step out there, you're gonna be King again". A decade earlier, in 1952, 17-year-old Elvis is raised in Memphis, Tennessee, at Lauderdale Court Apartments, with his doting mother Gladys, and his father Vernon. At his high school, Elvis is completely shunned by most of his fellow class mates for the way he dresses and does his hair. One year later, wanting to make a record for his mother's birthday, Elvis walks into Sun Records Studio where he meets owner and record producer Sam Phillips and his assistant Marion Keisker. He records the song, "My Happiness", and gives it to Gladys as a gift, which brings her to tears.

In 1954, Elvis is asked back to Sun Records, as Phillips has found a song that would be perfect for him, he brings along his fellow two band members Scotty Moore and Bill Black to help him out. After a few hours, while struggling to find the right sound, Presley and his band playfully perform "That's All Right", which Phillips is so impressed by that he tells them to perform it again, leading to the song becoming a massive recording hit. The next day, at Sun Records, Elvis and his band are looking for another song to record, which leads to Elvis singing "Blue Moon of Kentucky", which he performs live for the first time in Memphis. During the performance, Elvis begins shaking his leg and hips, in which the girls in the audience go wild for. Elvis becomes a massive star, touring around various states in America. At Presley's performance of "Good Rocking Tonight" at the Louisiana Hayride in 1954, a large man in a fedora hat, smoking a cigar watches from the audience view as they cheer Elvis's name.

At a diner in Memphis, Phillips and "Colonel" Tom Parker discuss Presley's management, if Phillips can take him further by going national, as Phillips is small time and doesn't have the connections, whereas Parker has people in New York, Los Angeles, music, film and television (having had previous experiences working with fellow music performers Eddy Arnold and Hank Snow). At the same time, after Phillips leaves, Elvis, Scotty and Bill arrive at the diner, where Elvis and Parker meet for the first time. Elvis tells Parker that he wants to buy his parents a new house, as well as his secret dream, which is to become a successful actor like James Dean or Marlon Brando. Parker promises this, as well as a new record deal and a million dollars for him and his family. Vernon and Gladys are amazed, but concerned by this, feeling if Parker can be trusted. Elvis surprises his mother with a Pink Cadillac, and tells his parents that they should put their trust in Parker.

In 1955, at the Odessa Auditorium, after performing "Baby Let's Play House", Presley's girlfriend and high school sweetheart, Dixie Locke, is upset that he hasn't been spending enough time with her, she breaks up with him and leaves the tour. Gladys and Vernon are concerned about Parker's management, having heard about their son being in riots, where Parker assures them that it will never happen again. Elvis visits Sam at his studio, knowing that Parker is his manager now and going national, Sam tells him that as long as he stays true to himself, he will be okay. The next day, Parker has booked Elvis on television, Presley, thankful for this, promises Parker his loyalty. In New York City, Elvis arrives at RCA Records, he records his first song there, "Heartbreak Hotel", which leads to him performing on his first live television appearance at The Dorsey Brothers Stage Show. The song reaches #1 on the Billboard Hot 100 chart, and receives Elvis his first Gold Record.

Later on, Parker has booked Elvis for a Hollywood screen test for the film The Rainmaker, which Presley ends up not getting the part, and for an appearance on The Milton Berle Show during a performance of "Hound Dog", which causes outrage among some segments of the public, particularly adults and religious groups, due to his provocative dance moves. In 1956, in Jacksonville, Florida, Elvis is warned by a local judge to keep his moves in check, or there will be warrants for his arrest. During a performance of "Don't Be Cruel" at the Jacksonville Theatre, Elvis wiggles his little finger on stage, this again causes outrage and Presley's sound attempting to get banned, including San Diego. Despite mounting criticism over his provocative performances, Elvis's popularity continues to grow. While travelling between appearances, he is briefly arrested at a gas station following an altercation with two local men, further fuelling the controversy surrounding his public image. Parker capitalises on Presley's growing fame by carefully cultivating his image, presenting him with a gold lamé suit to distinguish him from other performers. Elvis wears the suit during a triumphant performance of "Blue Suede Shoes" at the Chicago International Auditorium, cementing his status as one of America's biggest music stars.

As Elvis's fame reaches unprecedented heights, tragedy strikes when his beloved mother dies shortly after he is drafted into the United States Army. Devastated by her death, Elvis serves in Germany, where he meets young Priscilla Beaulieu and begins a relationship with her. After returning to America from military service, Elvis resumes his career as a recording artist and Hollywood star while continuing his relationship with Priscilla. Under Parker's management, Elvis is committed to a succession of commercially successful but artistically unfulfilling musical films. Increasingly disillusioned with his career and the relentless demands placed upon him, he begins relying on prescription pills to cope with the pressures of fame. While filming Viva Las Vegas, he begins a passionate affair with his co-star Ann-Margret, whose talent and ambition rekindle his enthusiasm for performing. Their relationship deepens during production, but Parker persuades him to end the affair in favour of maintaining his public image and his commitment to Priscilla. In the aftermath of the affair, Elvis becomes increasingly introspective, developing a growing interest in spirituality and religion. He begins reading religious and philosophical books in search of greater meaning and personal fulfilment. Elvis later marries Priscilla, and the couple have a daughter, Lisa Marie, but he becomes increasingly frustrated with Parker's refusal to let him evolve as an artist or tour internationally.

By the late 1960s, Elvis fears he has become irrelevant as popular music changes around him. NBC Producer Steve Binder persuades him to abandon a planned Christmas programme and instead create a television special centred on his music and live performances. Reuniting with his original bandmates for an intimate "sit-down" session, after a performance of "Lawdy Miss Clawdy", Elvis rediscovers his confidence and determination to reclaim his artistic identity. Emboldened by the success of the special, Elvis tells Parker that he wants to abandon his film career and fulfil his long-held ambition of touring internationally, including Japan. Frustrated by Parker's years of controlling his career and finding out about Parker being an illegal alien, Elvis attempts to terminate their professional relationship. Parker responds by producing a detailed accounting of commissions, advances, expenses and future earnings, claiming that Elvis owes him millions of dollars if he breaks their contract. Although Presley briefly considers firing Parker, his father warns that the financial consequences would bankrupt the family and questions whether Elvis could successfully manage his own affairs. Unable to find a way out of Parker's control, Elvis abandons the idea. The following day, Parker tears up the termination papers and announces that he has arranged a new tour—not overseas, but a long-term residency in Las Vegas—binding Elvis to the manager once again.

The miniseries concludes with Elvis delivering a powerful performance of "If I Can Dream", marking the triumphant success of the '68 Comeback Special.

== Cast ==
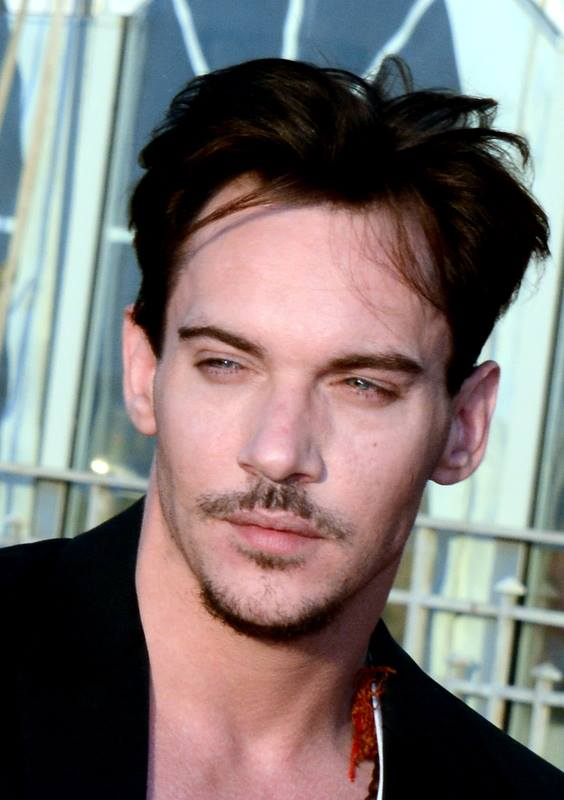
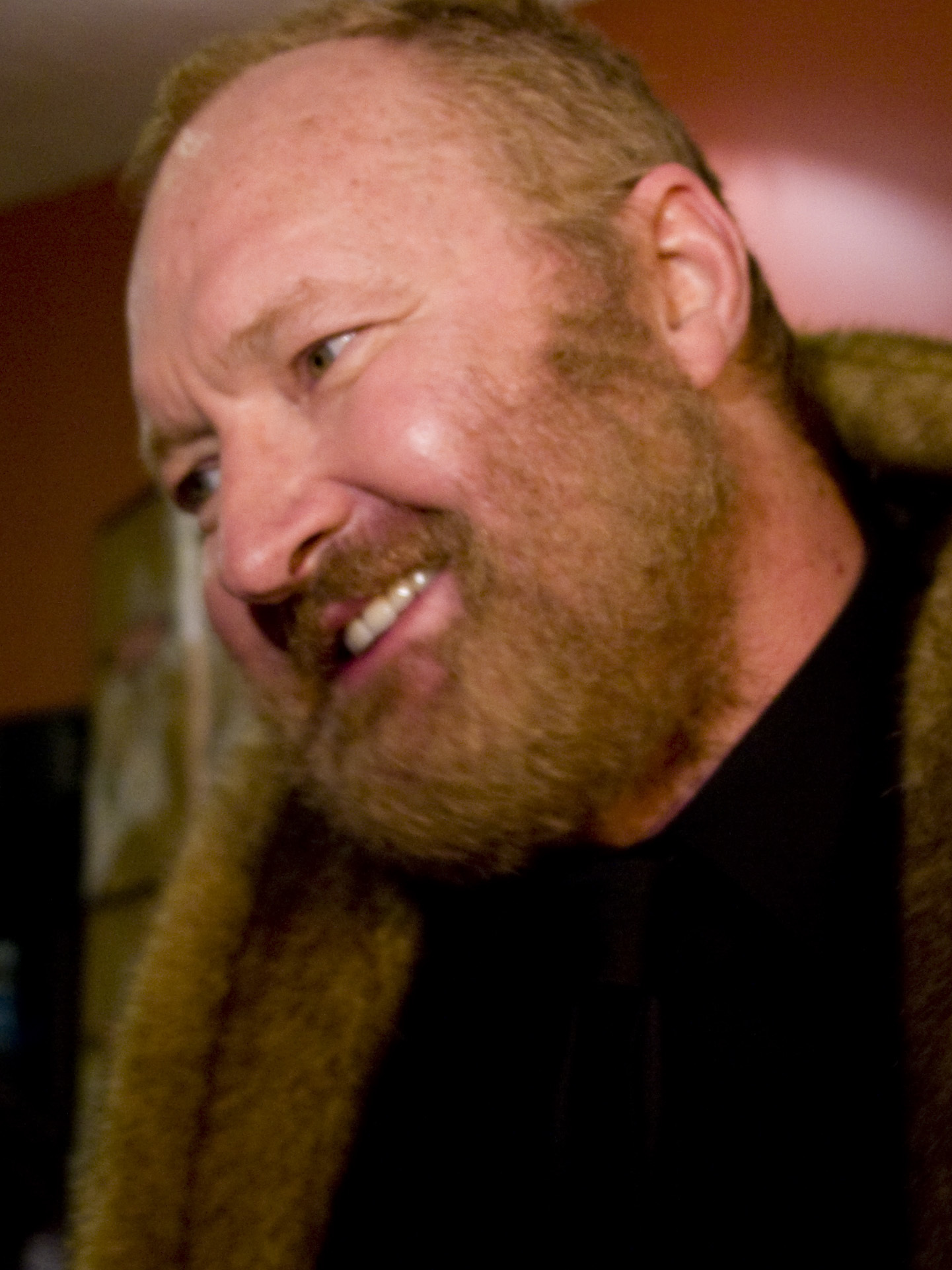
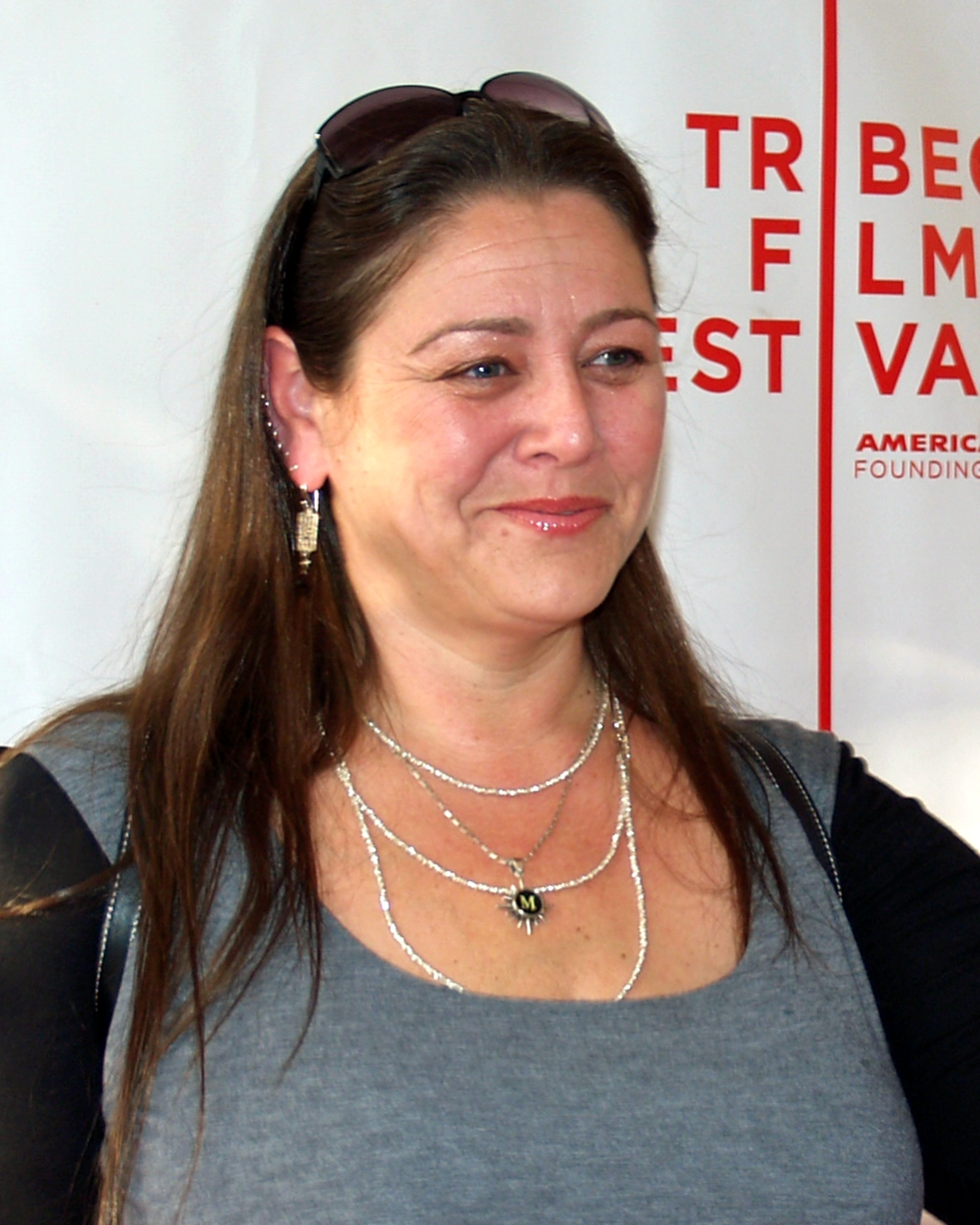
(Left to right) Jonathan Rhys Meyers (pictured in 2013), Randy Quaid (2008), and Camryn Manheim (2007) received critical acclaim for their performances of Elvis Presley, Colonel Tom Parker, and Gladys Presley respectively. All three earned Awards and nominations for Best Actor, Best Supporting Actor and Best Supporting Actress, with Rhys Meyers winning the Golden Globe in his category.
- Jonathan Rhys Meyers as Elvis Presley
- Randy Quaid as Colonel Tom Parker
- Rose McGowan as Ann-Margret
- Tim Guinee as Sam Phillips
- Antonia Bernath as Priscilla Presley
- Jack Noseworthy as Steve Binder
- Robert Patrick as Vernon Presley
- Camryn Manheim as Gladys Presley
- Stuart Greer as Captain Beaulieu
- Clay Steakley as Bill Black
- Mark Adam as Scotty Moore
- Jennifer Rae Westley as Dixie Locke
- John Boyd West as Red West
- Randy McDowell as Gene Smith
- Jill Jane Clements as Marion Keisker

== Awards and nominations ==
Year	Award	Category	Nominee(s)	Result	Ref.
2005	Artios Awards	Outstanding Achievement in Mini-Series Casting	Mary Jo Slater and Steve Brooksbank	Nominated	
2005	Online Film & Television Association Awards	Best Miniseries		Nominated	
2005	Online Film & Television Association Awards	Best Actor in a Motion Picture or Miniseries	Jonathan Rhys Meyers	Nominated	
2005	Online Film & Television Association Awards	Best Supporting Actor in a Motion Picture or Miniseries	Randy Quaid	Nominated	
2005	Online Film & Television Association Awards	Best Supporting Actress in a Motion Picture or Miniseries	Camryn Manheim	Won	
2005	Online Film & Television Association Awards	Best Ensemble in a Motion Picture or Miniseries		Nominated	
2005	Online Film & Television Association Awards	Best Sound in a Motion Picture or Miniseries		Nominated	
2005	Primetime Emmy Awards	Outstanding Miniseries	Michael Jaffe, Howard Braunstein, Robert Greenblatt, David Janollari, Jörg Westerkamp, Thomas Becker, Ilene Kahn Power, Malcolm Petal, Kimberly Calhoun Boling, and Judy Cairo	Nominated	
2005	Primetime Emmy Awards	Outstanding Lead Actor in a Miniseries or a Movie	Jonathan Rhys Meyers	Nominated	
2005	Primetime Emmy Awards	Outstanding Supporting Actor in a Miniseries or a Movie	Randy Quaid	Nominated	
2005	Primetime Emmy Awards	Outstanding Supporting Actress in a Miniseries or a Movie	Camryn Manheim	Nominated	
2005	Primetime Emmy Awards	Outstanding Casting for a Miniseries, Movie or a Special	Beth Blanks, Steve Brooksbank, and Mary Jo Slater	Nominated	
2005	Primetime Emmy Awards	Outstanding Costumes for a Miniseries, Movie or a Special	Eduardo Castro and Helen Monaghan (for "Part 1")	Nominated	
2005	Satellite Awards	Best Miniseries		Won	
2005	Satellite Awards	Best Actor in a Miniseries or Motion Picture Made for Television	Jonathan Rhys Meyers	Won	
2005	Satellite Awards	Best Actor in a Supporting Role in a Series, Miniseries or Motion Picture Made for Television	Randy Quaid	Won	
2005	Satellite Awards	Best Actress in a Supporting Role in a Series, Miniseries or Motion Picture Made for Television	Camryn Manheim	Nominated	
2006	Costume Designers Guild Awards	Outstanding Made for Television Movie or Miniseries	Eduardo Castro	Won	
2006	Directors Guild of America Awards	Outstanding Directorial Achievement in Movies for Television or Miniseries	James Steven Sadwith	Nominated	
2006	Golden Globe Awards	Best Actor – Miniseries or Television Film	Jonathan Rhys Meyers	Won	
2006	Golden Globe Awards	Best Supporting Actor – Series, Miniseries or Television Film	Randy Quaid	Nominated	
2006	Golden Globe Awards	Best Supporting Actress – Series, Miniseries or Television Film	Camryn Manheim	Nominated	

== Home media ==
The mini-series is available on a region-free DVD and was made available on August 14, 2007.

== See also ==
- Elvis (1979 film), television biopic directed by John Carpenter and starring Kurt Russell.
- Walk the Line, biopic also released in 2005 about the early life and career of musician Johnny Cash, that features a young Elvis, played by Tyler Hilton, during his early years at Sun Records whilst touring with Cash, Jerry Lee Lewis, Carl Perkins and Roy Orbison. Elvis: The Miniseries co-stars, Robert Patrick and Clay Steakley, both appear in this movie as Cash's father Ray, and as Cash's drummer W.S. "Fluke" Holland .
- Elvis (2022 film), musical biopic directed by Baz Luhrmann and starring Austin Butler.
