= Elvis (2022 film) =

2022 film by Baz Luhrmann

- Theatrical release poster
- Directed by: Baz Luhrmann
- Screenplay by: Baz Luhrmann (Note: Luhrmann is credited twice for writing the screenplay; first as part of a writing duo with Sam Bromell and again with frequent collaborator Craig Pearce.); Sam Bromell; Craig Pearce; Jeremy Doner
- Story by: Baz Luhrmann; Jeremy Doner
- Produced by: Baz Luhrmann; Catherine Martin; Gail Berman; Patrick McCormick; Schuyler Weiss
- Starring: Austin Butler; Tom Hanks; Olivia DeJonge; Helen Thomson; Richard Roxburgh
- Cinematography: Mandy Walker
- Edited by: Matt Villa; Jonathan Redmond
- Music by: Elliott Wheeler
- Production companies: Bazmark Films; The Jackal Group
- Distributed by: Warner Bros. Pictures (United States and Australia); Universal Pictures (Australia)
- Release dates: 25 May 2022 (Cannes); 23 June 2022 (Australia); 24 June 2022 (United States)
- Running time: 159 minutes
- Countries: Australia; United States
- Language: English
- Budget: $85 million
- Box office: $288.7 million

Elvis is a 2022 musical epic biographical drama film co-produced and directed by Baz Luhrmann, who co-wrote the screenplay with Sam Bromell, Craig Pearce, and Jeremy Doner. It chronicles the life of the American singer and actor Elvis Presley under the management of Colonel Tom Parker. It stars Austin Butler and Tom Hanks as Presley and Parker, respectively, with Olivia DeJonge, Helen Thomson, Richard Roxburgh, David Wenham, Kodi Smit-McPhee, and Luke Bracey in supporting roles.

10 years after the 2005 mini-series, a biographical film about Presley was first announced in 2014, with Luhrmann set to direct. However, the project languished in development hell until early 2019, when Hanks joined the film. Butler was cast in the title role that July, beating out several other actors including Miles Teller and Harry Styles. Filming began in Australia in January 2020 but was put on hiatus in March after Hanks tested positive for COVID-19 at the onset of the pandemic. Production resumed in September, wrapping in March 2021.

Elvis premiered at the Cannes Film Festival on 25 May 2022, and was released in Australia on 23 June and in the United States on 24 June, by Warner Bros. Pictures. It received generally positive reviews from critics and was a commercial success, grossing over $288 million worldwide against an $85 million budget. The American Film Institute named Elvis one of the top-ten films of 2022. Elvis received eight nominations at the 95th Academy Awards, including Best Picture and Best Actor for Butler, among numerous other accolades. A stage adaptation, with Luhrmann attached as a producer, is in development.

During production of Elvis, Luhrmann unearthed previously unseen footage of Presley that ended up forming the basis of a documentary, EPiC: Elvis Presley in Concert. It was released in September 2025.

== Plot ==
Raised mostly by his doting mother Gladys, Elvis Presley spends his childhood in the slums of Tupelo, Mississippi, finding solace in music and comic books. After moving with his parents to Memphis, Tennessee, he is ridiculed by his peers due to his fascination with the African-American music of Beale Street. Colonel Tom Parker, at the time a carnival huckster, manages country singer Hank Snow but realizes Elvis' crossover potential when he hears "That's All Right," initially assuming that the artist is black. That night, after witnessing his intense sex appeal at a "Louisiana Hayride" performance, Parker invites Elvis to accompany him on a tour and convinces Elvis to let him take control of his career, which begins Elvis' meteoric ascent: he moves from Sun Records to RCA Records, his father Vernon is appointed as business manager of Elvis Presley Enterprises, and the family is lifted out of poverty.

The regional public is polarized on Elvis. Feeling that his music will corrupt white children and stoke racial hostility, segregationist Southern Democrat Mississippi Senator James Eastland calls Parker to an informal hearing and probes his mysterious past. When Elvis flouts the authorities' warnings and performs suggestive dance moves at a concert, he faces legal trouble. Parker persuades the government to draft Elvis into the Army instead of penalizing him. Elvis returns from basic training only to be devastated by his mother's death from drinking. During his military service in West Germany, he meets 14-year-old Priscilla Beaulieu, the daughter of an Air Force pilot. After his discharge, he embarks on a film career and later marries Priscilla.

As the popular culture of the 1960s passes Elvis by, the assassinations of Martin Luther King Jr. and Robert F. Kennedy in 1968 devastate him. Although he wants to become more politically outspoken in his music, Parker has booked a family-friendly Christmas television special where he will only perform frivolous feel-good songs. Elvis works with Steve Binder to re-imagine the special, and his performance, including the closing song "If I Can Dream," which incorporates not only a review of his past songs but also political commentary. Corporate sponsors threaten litigation, enraging Parker; however, the show is highly successful.

Afterward, Elvis headlines at the largest showroom in Las Vegas in the International Hotel, and resumes concert tours. Parker's control of Elvis' life tightens as he refuses his request for a world tour. Motivated by gambling debts, Parker manipulates Elvis into signing a contract for a five-year Las Vegas casino residency. Elvis' problematic behavior and prescription drug addiction overtake him, and a despondent Priscilla divorces him, taking their daughter Lisa Marie with her. After discovering that Parker cannot leave the country because he is a stateless illegal immigrant, Elvis attempts to fire him. Parker subsequently informs Vernon that the family owes him an $8,549,761.09 debt accumulated since 1955 and convinces Elvis of their symbiotic relationship; though they became distant afterward, Parker continues as his manager. Increasingly exhausted after a continuously rigorous schedule of shows, Elvis expresses to Priscilla his fear of being forgotten after death, as he believes he has achieved nothing worthwhile.

On 21 June 1977, in Rapid City, South Dakota, an obese, pale, and weak Elvis sings "Unchained Melody" to thunderous applause. He dies shortly thereafter, on 16 August 1977. Parker claims what really killed Elvis was neither his heart attack nor drug-related suicide as some believe, but rather his love for his fans.

A postscript states that Parker's financial abuse of Elvis was exposed in a series of lawsuits beginning a few years after Elvis' death. Parker tried to claim immunity as a citizen of no country, but eventually settled out in court and ending his ties with the Presley estate. Parker then spent his final years in ill health wandering through Las Vegas' casinos pouring his wealth into the slot machines. Elvis remained the best-selling solo artist of all time. His influence on music and culture lives on.

== Cast ==
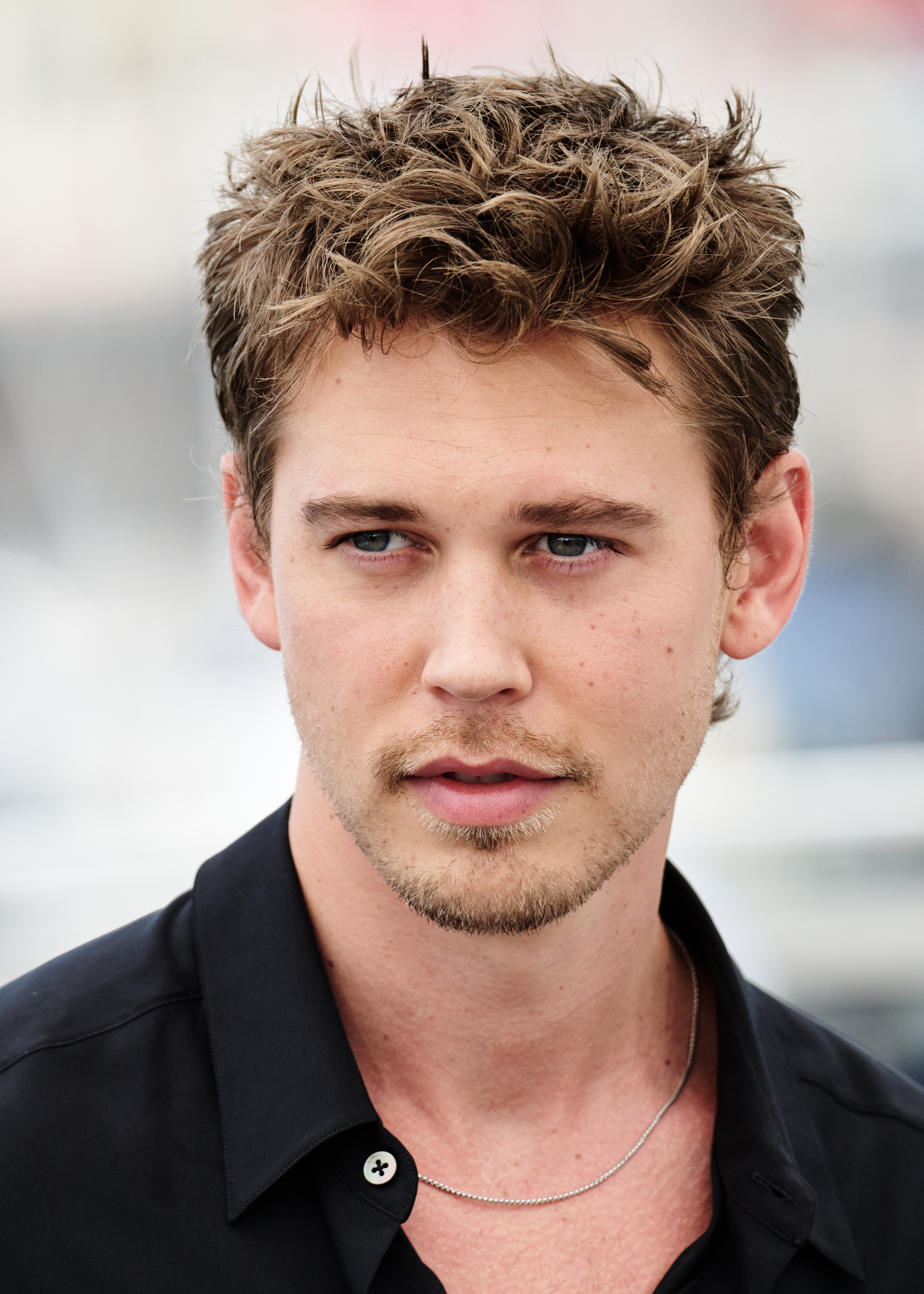
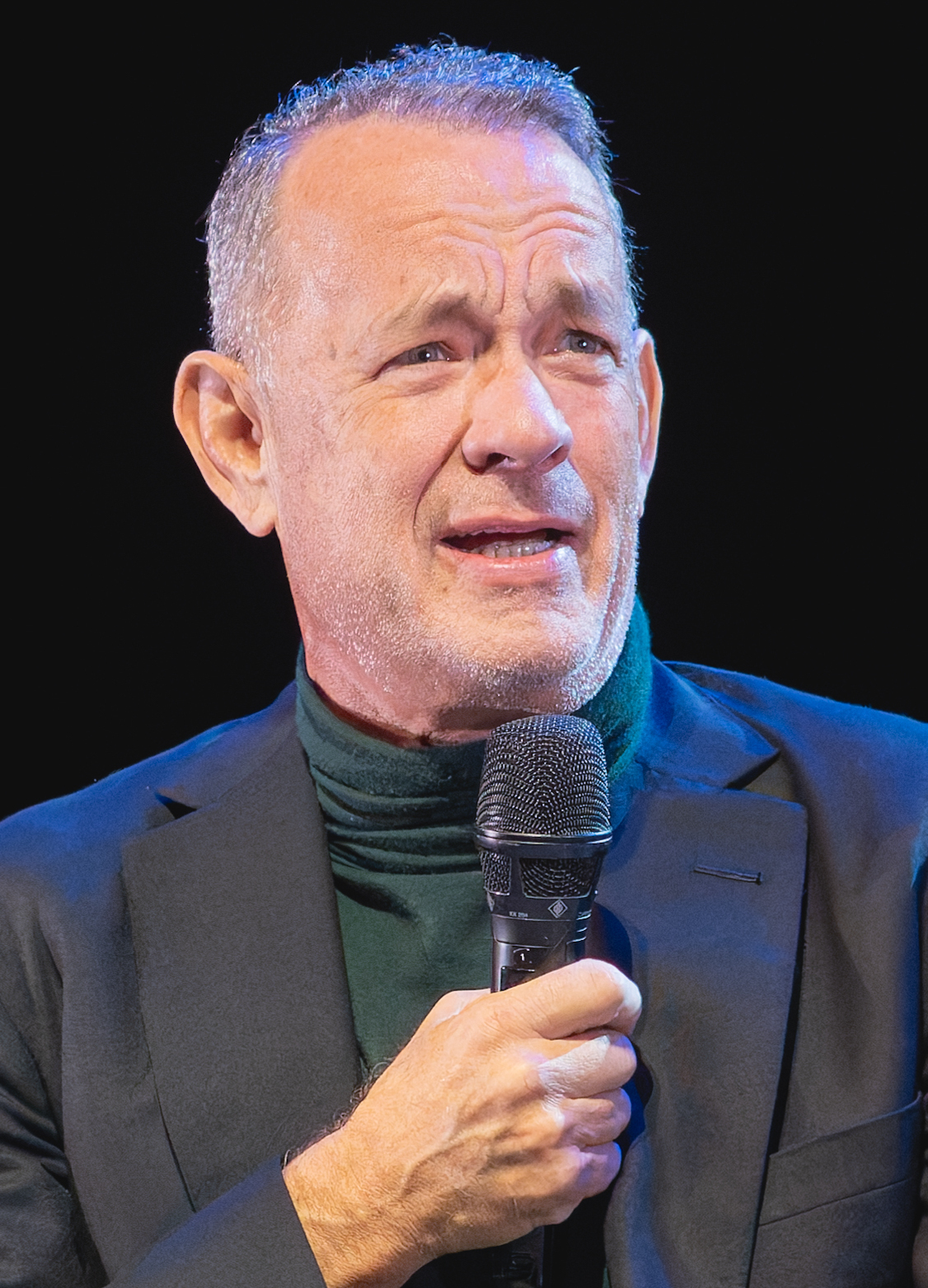
Austin Butler (left) and Tom Hanks play Elvis Presley and Col. Tom Parker respectively.
- Austin Butler as Elvis Presley
  - Chaydon Jay as young Elvis Presley
- Tom Hanks as Colonel Tom Parker
- Olivia DeJonge as Priscilla Presley
- Helen Thomson as Gladys Presley
- Richard Roxburgh as Vernon Presley
- Kelvin Harrison Jr. as B. B. King
- David Wenham as Hank Snow
- Kodi Smit-McPhee as Jimmie Rodgers Snow
- Luke Bracey as Jerry Schilling
- Dacre Montgomery as Steve Binder
- Leon Ford as Tom Diskin
- Gary Clark Jr. as Arthur "Big Boy" Crudup
- Yola as Sister Rosetta Tharpe
- Natasha Bassett as Dixie Locke
- Xavier Samuel as Scotty Moore
- Adam Dunn as Bill Black
- Alton Mason as Little Richard
- Shonka Dukureh as Big Mama Thornton / Pentecostal singer
- Natalie Bassingthwaighte as Dee Stanley
- Sharon Brooks as Sylvia Shemwell of the Sweet Inspirations
- Cle Morgan as Mahalia Jackson
- Liz Blackett as Minnie Mae Presley
- Nicholas Bell as James Eastland
- Kate Mulvany as Marion Keisker
- Josh McConville as Sam Phillips
- Angie Milliken as Madam Z
- Mark Leonard Winter as Tom Hulett

== Production ==
=== Development and casting ===
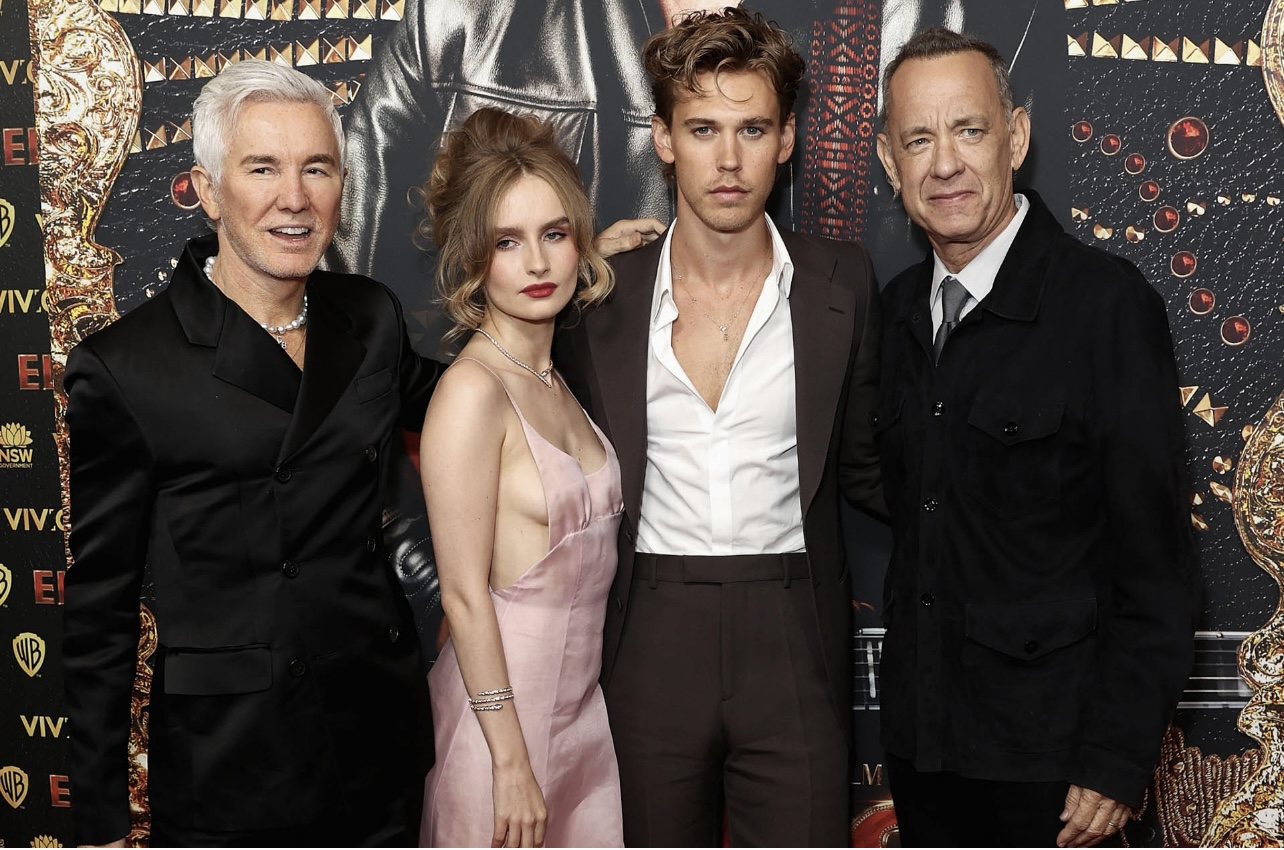
From left to right: Writer, director, and producer Baz Luhrmann, with stars Olivia DeJonge, Austin Butler, Tom Hanks.

Steve Tisch and Gary Goodman purchased the film rights to Peter Guralnick's Elvis biography Last Train to Memphis in 1995, which would have focused on Presley's early career until his military draft. A screenplay was written by Tom Rickman as a 20th Century Fox production. In 1996, Jerry Schilling was brought aboard as a producer/consultant and Tom Parker as a technical advisor, with Elvis Presley Enterprises entering negotiations with imaging and music rights. The plan was to cast an unknown actor for the lead role. Last Train to Memphis languished in development through 2013, when Kevin Macdonald was announced as director and Mick Jagger as producer. Fox 2000 would have released the film, but the project never materialized. This was not the first time Elvis's life has been brought to the screen, having previously been portrayed in numerous television shows, most notably the John Carpenter film from 1979, and a two-part mini-series released by CBS from 20 years ago also titled Elvis (2005), featuring a Golden Globe winning performance from Irish born actor Jonathan Rhys Meyers in the lead role, that largely focused on his early life from the 1950s and 60's, which had also been done with the co-operation of the Elvis Presley estate and was the first to use Presley's master recordings in a biographical film.

Baz Luhrmann's involvement was first announced in April 2014, with Kelly Marcel writing the script for Warner Bros. No further development was announced until March 2019, when Tom Hanks was cast in the role of Colonel Tom Parker. Luhrmann was set as director, and also replaced Marcel as screenwriter with Sam Bromell and Craig Pearce.

In July, the frontrunners for the role of Presley were Ansel Elgort, Miles Teller, Austin Butler, Aaron Taylor-Johnson and Harry Styles; later that month Butler won the role, after impressing Luhrmann with an audition tape of himself singing "Unchained Melody". Luhrmann revealed in an interview with Entertainment Weekly that he got a call from Denzel Washington recommending Butler, having previously worked with him in a 2018 theatre production of The Iceman Cometh. In October, Olivia DeJonge was cast to play Priscilla Presley. Maggie Gyllenhaal and Rufus Sewell were cast as Gladys and Vernon Presley in February 2020 (though they were replaced in the film by Helen Thomson and Richard Roxburgh, respectively), with Yola cast as Sister Rosetta Tharpe.

=== Filming ===
Principal photography began on 28 January 2020, in Australia. On 12 March 2020, production was halted when Hanks and his wife Rita Wilson tested positive for COVID-19 during the pandemic. Filming resumed on 23 September. In September 2020, Luke Bracey, Richard Roxburgh, Helen Thomson, Dacre Montgomery, Natasha Bassett, Xavier Samuel, Leon Ford, Kate Mulvany, Gareth Davies, Charles Grounds, Josh McConville, and Adam Dunn joined the cast of the film. Roxburgh and Thomson replaced Sewell and Gyllenhaal, respectively, who had to drop out due to scheduling conflicts caused by the shooting delay. Kelvin Harrison Jr. was announced to be portraying B. B. King in December. In January 2021, it was reported that Alton Mason would be portraying Little Richard in the film. On 25 May 2022, Butler revealed to GQ that after filming wrapped in March 2021, he was hospitalized and bedridden for a week after being diagnosed with a virus that simulated appendicitis.

=== Music ===
On 25 April 2022, it was announced that American rapper Doja Cat would contribute an original song for the film, "Vegas", which incorporates elements from Big Mama Thornton's "Hound Dog". It was released as a single on 6 May 2022, ahead of the film's companion soundtrack album, scheduled for release that summer by RCA Records. The album also features variations on Presley material by big name artists in a variety of genres and styles. Sound artists and audio engineers François Tétaz and Lachlan Carrick mastered and produced the album (which was nominated for a Grammy), including the Doja Cat track.

Italian band Måneskin and American country singer Kacey Musgraves are also part of the soundtrack, with their respective cover versions of "If I Can Dream" and "Can't Help Falling in Love". Rapper Eminem and CeeLo Green collaborated on a track titled "The King and I" which was produced by Dr. Dre. Other artists to feature on the album include Stevie Nicks, Jack White, Diplo, Swae Lee and many more, along with the film's cast. Austin Butler's renditions of Presley's songs, as well as actual recordings by Presley himself, are also featured.

External videos
- The 2019 pre-production test shoot showcasing Austin Butler's live vocal performance as Presley when he is young via Baz Luhrmann's Twitter

On 12 June 2022, Luhrmann revealed that when Presley sings in the film, it is Butler's vocals that are used when he is young. To prove it, he released on social media an early 2019 pre-production test shoot of Butler as young Presley performing "That's All Right" live on set, which went viral and received an overwhelmingly positive response from viewers. Butler's vocals were blended with Presley's when he is older.

== Marketing ==
The first three-minute trailer for the film premiered during NBC's live coverage of the 2022 Winter Olympics on 17 February 2022, and was uploaded online the same day. Nick Relly of Rolling Stone stated "The trailer opens with a foreboding voiceover from Hanks's Parker, in which he acknowledges that he is considered the "villain of this here story"—owing to the widespread belief that Parker's interest in Elvis was mainly financially motivated. From there, we're given a look at some of Elvis' most electrifying early performances, with Butler bearing an uncanny resemblance to the King himself." Sasha Urban of Variety and Rania Aniftos of Billboard praised Butler's performance as he "uncannily resembled Presley". The second trailer premiered online on 23 May 2022, two days before the film's world premiere at the 2022 Cannes Film Festival. James White of Empire stated "With typical Luhrmann swagger and style, this could be a good fit of filmmaker and subject". Screen Rant-based Adam Bentz stated "The trailer highlights how the biopic spans a period of over twenty years and chronicles both the singer's opulent rise to stardom and eventual fall from grace."

In a May 2022 interview with Sotheby's, Luhrmann refuted the label of "biopic" to describe the film: "As it turns out, I've just made a film called Elvis which isn't even really about Elvis. It's really about America in the fifties, sixties, and seventies." NME magazine dedicated a standalone free-print issue of 36 pages, covering Presley's life, interviews with Butler, Luhrmann and other cast members. A special Elvis-inspired shoot with artists Wallice and Master Peace, musical guide to 10 tracks from Presley and the city of Memphis and the magazine's interview with Presley in 1960 (from the archives). The magazine issues were made available digitally and through physical prints in stores on 16 June 2022. An ABC special, Exclusively Elvis: A Special Edition of 20/20, featuring a look at Presley's real-life and the making of the film, aired on 21 June 2022, to promote the film. AMC Theatres, in collaboration with Feverup, announced a pre-sale special where viewers could purchase tickets to the film for $10.99. The final trailer was released online on 22 June 2022.

== Release ==
Elvis was released in cinemas in Australia on 23 June 2022, and in the United States on 24 June by Warner Bros. Pictures. It was previously scheduled to be released on 1 October 2021, before being delayed to 5 November 2021, due to the COVID-19 pandemic, and later to 3 June 2022. The film was not listed as part of the December 2020 announcement by Warner Bros. Pictures to debut its entire 2021 slate concurrently in movie theatres and on HBO Max, before the film was officially pushed to 2022.

The film became eligible to be made available on HBO Max and premium video on demand (PVOD) on 8 August 2022, 45 days after its theatrical release, under a plan announced by WarnerMedia in 2021. However, IndieWire reported shortly before that date that the merged Warner Bros. Discovery had decided to instead release Elvis solely to PVOD on 9 August and to Blu-ray/DVD on 13 September with HBO Max availability likely to follow in the fall. The film became available for streaming exclusively on HBO Max on 2 September, followed by the HBO network premiere on 3 September.

The film had its world premiere at the 2022 Cannes Film Festival on 25 May 2022, where it received a twelve-minute standing ovation from the audience, the longest for an Australian film at the festival and tying with Hirokazu Kore-eda's Broker for the longest overall. It also opened the Guadalajara International Film Festival in Mexico on 10 June and at the Sydney Film Festival in Australia on 15 June.

=== 2023 re-release ===
Following the film's reception of its eight Oscar nominations, Warner Bros. announced its return to theaters for a limited engagement starting on 27 January 2023.

=== Plan for a four-hour cut release ===
In June 2022, Luhrmann revealed that he had originally planned a four-hour cut of the film which notably contains scenes of Presley with his first girlfriend, Dixie, and his meeting with President Richard Nixon in 1970, sequences that he was sorry to leave out of the theatrically released cut. In September, Luhrmann commented on the possibility that the four-hour cut could see the light of day.

Luhrmann stated he wanted to cut together a sequence of Austin Butler performing as Presley in an uninterrupted full concert (as many of Butler's individual performances were interspersed throughout the theatrically released cut). According to Luhrmann, this concert version would be a "director's assembly," not a full version of the film, with the material still needing to be edited and worked on.

== EPiC: Elvis Presley in Concert ==
During production of Elvis, Luhrmann sought out unseen footage from Elvis: That's the Way It Is and Elvis on Tour with the intent of using it in the film. Sixty-eight boxes of both 35mm and 8mm footage were found in the Warner Bros. film archives deep within salt mines in Kansas, including outtakes from both films, plus the "gold lamé jacket" performance from Hawaii in 1957 and unheard interviews. It was decided that there was enough for an entirely separate film, and the footage was then restored over a two-year period. This formed the basis of EPiC: Elvis Presley in Concert, a new documentary which is structured around audio of Presley telling his life story. It premiered at the Toronto International Film Festival in September 2025.

== Reception ==
=== Box office ===
Elvis grossed $151 million in the United States and Canada, and $137.6 million in other territories, for a worldwide total of $288.7 million.

In the United States and Canada, Elvis was released alongside The Black Phone, and was projected to gross $25–30 million from 3,906 theaters in its opening weekend. It made $12.7 million on its first day, including $3.5 million from Thursday night previews. It went on to debut to $31.2 million, beating out holdover Top Gun: Maverick for first place atop the box office. According to PostTrak, 31% of the opening weekend audiences was over the age of 55, with 48% being over 45, while women over 25 (the most hesitant to return to theaters amid the pandemic) made up 45%. The main reasons given for seeing the film were the subject matter (49%) and Hanks (25%). In its second weekend the film made $18.5 million (a drop of 40.9%), and $22.7 million over the four-day Independence Day weekend, finishing third behind Top Gun: Maverick and Minions: The Rise of Gru. In its third weekend the film made $11.2 million, finishing in fourth behind Top Gun: Maverick, Minions The Rise of Gru and Thor: Love and Thunder.

Outside the US and Canada, the film made $20 million from 50 markets in its first international weekend. In its second weekend, the film passed the $100 million worldwide threshold after adding $15.7 million (a drop of 28%) to its total. In its third weekend, it performed well against newcomer Thor: Love and Thunder internationally, grossing $8.7 million (a drop of 44%). It crossed the $200 million worldwide mark in its fifth weekend. As of 24 August 2022, the film's largest markets include the UK ($29.47 million), Australia ($22.5 million), France ($8.3 million), Mexico ($7.4 million), Japan ($5.2 million), and Germany ($6.01 million).

=== Audience viewership ===
By 25 March 2023, the film had been streamed on HBO Max in 9 million households in the United States according to Samba TV, including 3.1 million since the Oscar nomination announcements on 24 January, the highest total of any Best Picture nominee that year. According to The Numbers, the movie's video release, namely the DVD and Blu-Ray versions has sold almost 750,000 copies bringing a tally of $14,263,700 which covers the period from its release in October 2022 till May 2023, the last week for which video sales in the US are available at the time of writing (January 2024).

=== Critical response ===
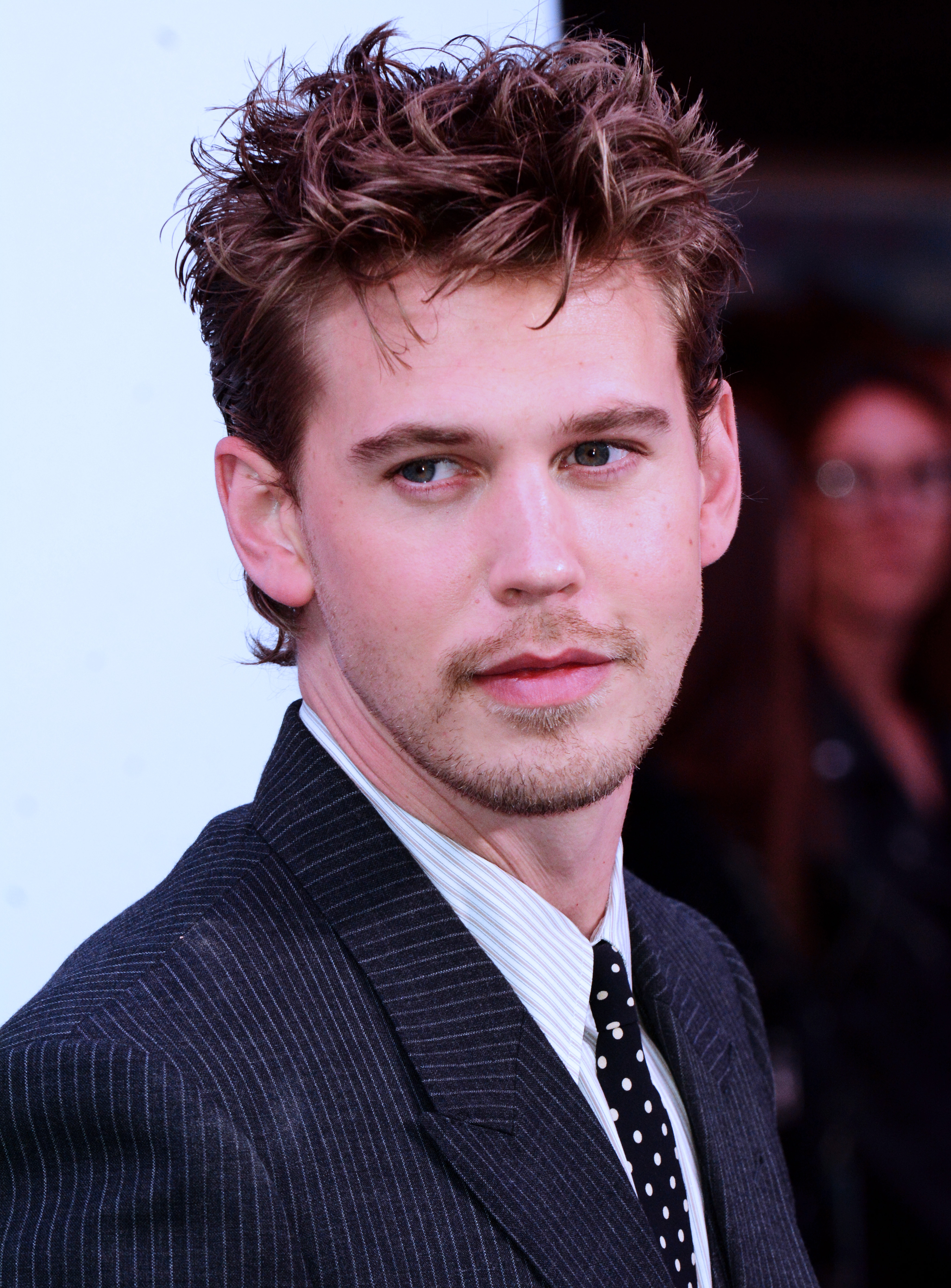
Austin Butler garnered critical acclaim for his performance and earned an Academy Award nomination for Best Actor.

On the review aggregator website Rotten Tomatoes, 77% of 398 critics' reviews are positive, with an average rating of 6.8/10. The website's consensus reads: "The standard rock biopic formula gets all shook up in Elvis, with Baz Luhrmann's dazzling energy and style perfectly complemented by Austin Butler's outstanding lead performance." Metacritic, which uses a weighted average, assigned the film a score of 64 out of 100, based on 60 critics, indicating "generally favorable" reviews. Audiences polled by CinemaScore gave the film an average grade of "A−" on an A+ to F scale, while PostTrak gave the film an 88% overall positive score, with 72% saying they would definitely recommend it.

Butler's portrayal of Presley was widely acclaimed. Justin Chang of the Los Angeles Times described Butler as "a decent physical match for Elvis and a better one vocally." David Rooney wrote for The Hollywood Reporter that Butler "captures the tragic paradox of a phenomenal success story who clings tenaciously to the American Dream even as it keeps crumbling in his hands." Clarisse Loughrey of The Independent wrote that he "makes a compelling argument for the power of Elvis, at a time when the musician's arguably lost a little of his cultural cachet."

On the film itself, Robbie Collin of The Telegraph gave it four out of five stars, calling it "a bright and splashy jukebox epic," but that "it veers in and out of fashion on a scene-by-scene basis: it's the most impeccably styled and blaringly gaudy thing you'll see all year, and all the more fun for it." Kevin Maher of The Times called it Luhrmann's "best film since Romeo + Juliet ... The power in the musical numbers is drawn from Butler's turn but also from Luhrmann, who edits with the kind of frenetic rhythms that are almost impossible to resist (feet will tap) ... They are the spine-tingling highlights that make the entire project a must-see movie." Jim Vejvoda of IGN called it "a dizzying and at times even overwhelming chronicle of the rock icon." Owen Gleiberman of Variety called it "A fizzy, delirious, impishly energized, compulsively watchable 2-hour-and-39-minute fever dream – a spangly pinwheel of a movie that converts the Elvis saga we all carry around in our heads into a lavishly staged biopic-as-pop-opera." Joshua Rothkopf wrote for Entertainment Weekly that it "delivers the icon like never before" and that Luhrmann recaptured "his Moulin Rouge! mojo with a hip-swiveling profile loaded with risk and reward." He went on to praise Butler's performance, saying that he "stares down the lens and melts it."

Manohla Dargis of The New York Times, while praising the visuals and Butler's performance, felt mixed about the film being told from Colonel Tom Parker's perspective, saying "I would have loved to have listened in on Luhrmann and Hanks's conversations about their ideas for the character; if nothing else, it might have explained what in the world they were after here. I honestly haven't a clue, although the image of Sydney Greenstreet looming menacingly in The Maltese Falcon repeatedly came to mind, with a dash of Hogan's Heroes." In a review for IndieWire, David Ehrlich wrote that it "finds so little reason for Presley's life to be the stuff of a Baz Luhrmann movie that the equation ultimately inverts itself, leaving us with an Elvis Presley movie about Baz Luhrmann. They both deserve better." He also criticized Hanks's portrayal of Parker, calling it "a 'true true' performance defined by a fat suit, a fake nose, and an accent that I can only describe as the 'Kentucky Fried Goldmember'." On a historical note, journalist Alanna Nash, who had written an acclaimed biography of Parker in 2010, called the film a "Baz Luhrmann fever dream" that kept the liberties with history fair except to Parker, citing that Luhrmann's approach of presenting it through a present-day lens meant that the complicated character researched by Nash of Parker is simplified.

=== Response of the Presley family ===
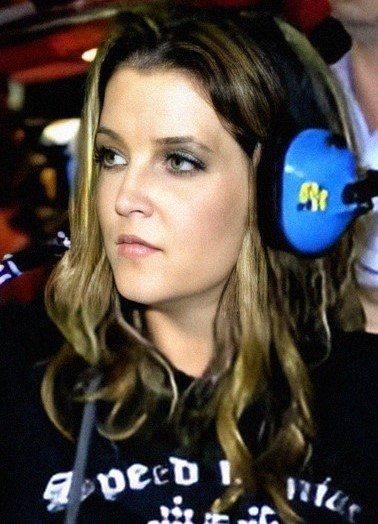
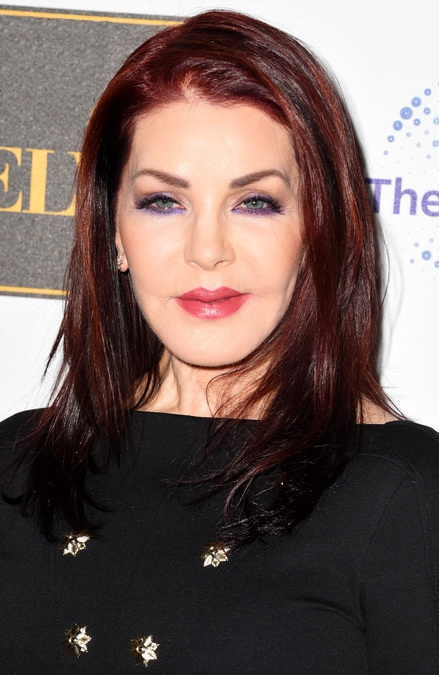
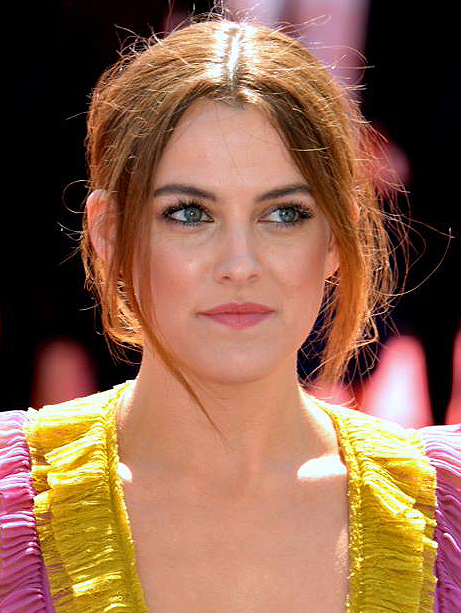
Presley's daughter Lisa Marie (left), ex-wife Priscilla and granddaughter Riley Keough all praised the film, particularly Butler's performance and Luhrmann's direction.

Prior to its world premiere at the Cannes Film Festival, Lisa Marie Presley, Elvis's daughter, praised the film in an Instagram post after seeing it twice, and she went on to give her thoughts on Butler's performance as her late father, stating that he "channeled and embodied my father's heart and soul beautifully. In my humble opinion, his performance is unprecedented and FINALLY done accurately and respectfully", while touting Butler as a frontrunner for the Academy Award for Best Actor. Regarding Luhrmann's directing, she wrote that:

You can feel his pure love, care, and respect for my father throughout this beautiful film, and it is finally something that myself and my children and their children can be proud of forever ... your utter genius combined with your love and respect for my father and this project is just so beautiful and so inspiring. I know I'm being repetitive, but I don't care, Thank you for setting the record straight in such a deeply profound and artistic way.

She added that watching the film reminded her of her own son, Benjamin, who died by suicide in 2020, saying he would have loved it as well.

On 10 January 2023, Lisa Marie appeared at the 80th Golden Globe Awards in support of Butler's win for Best Actor – Motion Picture Drama; it was her last public appearance before her death two days later.

Presley's ex-wife, Priscilla, gave her thoughts on the film, saying in full:

For those curious about the new film ELVIS, Baz Luhrmann, the director, provided a private screening for me and Jerry Schilling at Warner studios recently. This story is about Elvis and Colonel Parker's relationship. It is a true story told brilliantly and creatively that only Baz, in his unique artistic way, could have delivered. Austin Butler, who played Elvis is outstanding. Halfway through the film, Jerry and I looked at each other and said WOW!!! Bravo to him... he knew he had big shoes to fill. He was extremely nervous playing this part. I can only imagine. Tom Hanks was Col Parker in this film. What a character he was. There was two sides to Colonel, Jerry and I witnessed both. The story, as we all know, does not have a happy ending. But I think you will understand a little bit more of Elvis's journey, penned by a director who put his heart and soul and many hours into this film.

In an interview with Today on 16 August 2022, Priscilla defended parts of the film's portrayal of Elvis and Parker's tense relationship, stating, "I lived the arguments that they had, I lived Elvis trying to explain he didn't want to do the movies with all the girls and the beaches and everything, that he really wanted to do serious things. So living that, with him, and watching the movie, it brought back a lot of memories." On 21 May 2022, Presley's granddaughter, actress and filmmaker Riley Keough, shared her response after viewing the film at Cannes, saying in full:

It was a very emotional experience. It's very intense to watch when it's your family. The first movie I ever watched in the theater and said I wanted to make movies was Moulin Rouge!, I was 12. It was a real honor to know Baz was doing this movie. Romeo + Juliet and Moulin Rouge!, for the age I was at the time, were really powerful. It wasn't like I distrusted Baz in any way, but you're protective over your family. At the end of the day, we're not going to tell Baz Luhrmann how to make a movie. In the first five minutes, I could feel how much work Baz and Austin put into trying to get it right. That made me emotional immediately. I started crying five minutes in and didn't stop. There's a lot of family trauma and generational trauma that started around then for our family. I felt honored they worked so hard to really get his essence, to feel his essence. Austin captured that so beautifully.

== Accolades ==
At the 95th Academy Awards, Elvis was nominated for Best Picture, Best Actor, Best Sound, Best Production Design, Best Cinematography, Best Makeup and Hairstyling, Best Costume Design, and Best Film Editing. The film's other nominations include nine British Academy Film Awards (winning four), seven Critics' Choice Movie Awards (winning one), and three Golden Globe Awards (winning one). The American Film Institute named Elvis one of the top-ten films of 2022.

== Historical accuracy ==
Elvis was indeed influenced by blues and R&B, but the film downplayed the crooner and country influences on his music.

== See also ==
- Elvis (1979 film), directed by John Carpenter
- Elvis (1990 TV series), created by Rick Husky
- Elvis Meets Nixon, 1997 comedy film about Elvis's meeting with President Richard Nixon in December 1970, directed by Allan Arkush
- Elvis (miniseries), 2005 mini-series, directed by James Steven Sadwith
- Elvis & Nixon, 2016 film also detailing Elvis's meeting with President Nixon, directed by Liza Johnson
- Elvis Presley: The Searcher, 2018 Documentary film, directed by Thom Zimny
- Priscilla (film), 2023 film about Priscilla Presley's relationship with Elvis, directed by Sofia Coppola
- List of films set in Las Vegas
